= List of European Space Agency programmes and missions =

Chart of the European Space Agency's past, present, and future flagship space telescope (top) and space probe (bottom) missions, as of September 2025.

The European Space Agency (ESA) operates a number of space missions, both individually and in collaborations with other space agencies such as U.S. NASA, Japanese JAXA, Chinese CNSA, as well as space agencies of ESA member states (eg. French CNES, Italian ASI, German DLR, Polish POLSA). ESA organizes its missions into various budgetary programmes. This list follows the divisions of the Science Programme, the FutureEO Programme, and the Space Safety Programme. Missions from other programmes, such as Terrae Novae, FLPP, GSTP, or ARTES, are listed in loosely thematic categories.

The current iteration of ESA's Science Programme is the Cosmic Vision Programme, a series of space science missions chosen by ESA to launch through competitions, similar to NASA's Discovery and New Frontiers programmes. It follows the Horizon 2000 and Horizon 2000+ programmes which launched notable missions such as Huygens (Titan lander), Rosetta (comet orbiter and lander), and Gaia (astrometry telescope). These missions are divided into two categories: "Sun and Solar System", space probes studying the Solar System (eg. Solar Orbiter studying the Sun and JUICE currently on its way to Jupiter) and "Astrophysics", space telescopes contributing to interstellar astronomy (eg. CHEOPS characterising exoplanets and Euclid focused on dark matter and dark energy). The Cosmic Vision Programme will be followed by Voyage 2050.

A similarly operated programme focused on Earth observation, known as FutureEO, has launched various "Earth Explorer" satellites, which serve many aspects of Geoscience, often related to climate change. These include eg. GOCE and Swarm studying Earth's gravitational and magnetic fields, CryoSat-2 studying Earth's polar ice caps, and EarthCARE characterising clouds and aerosols in the atmosphere. The Earth Explorer missions are complemented by a series of smaller "Scout" satellites starting with HydroGNSS launched in late 2025.

A number of Solar System, Astrophysics, and Earth observation missions by ESA have operated outside of these programmes, such as Giotto, Ulysses, Mars Express, Hipparcos, or Envisat. ESA also takes part in human spaceflight missions of other space agencies and commercial partners, eg. by providing European astronauts and major hardware components to the Space Shuttle, Mir, ISS, and Artemis programmes and supporting the Gaganyyan programme. ESA works with European space industry on development of launch vehicles and reentry systems like the Ariane and Vega rockets and the Space Rider spaceplane. Together with other European institutions, ESA develops and operates various satellite constellations for Earth observation, meteorology, communication, and navigation, eg. Meteosat, Sentinel, Galileo, or EDRS. ESA's portfolio also includes public-private partnerships with European satellite operators such as Eutelsat and Inmarsat.

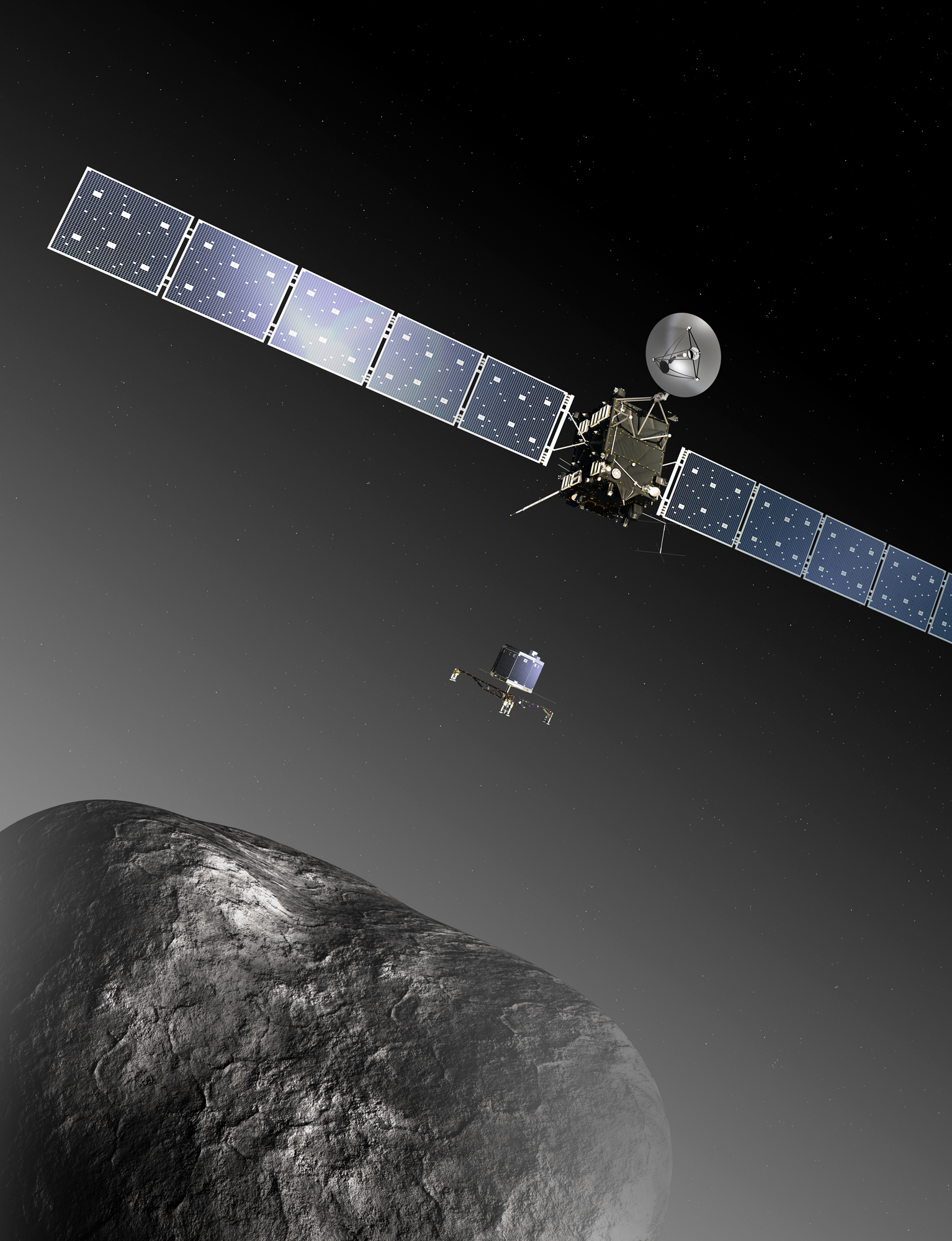
Illustration of Rosetta and Philae at the comet

== Horizon 2000 Programme ==
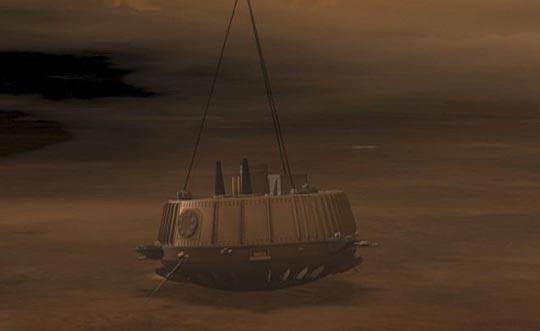
Artist's impression of Huygens probe on the surface of Titan

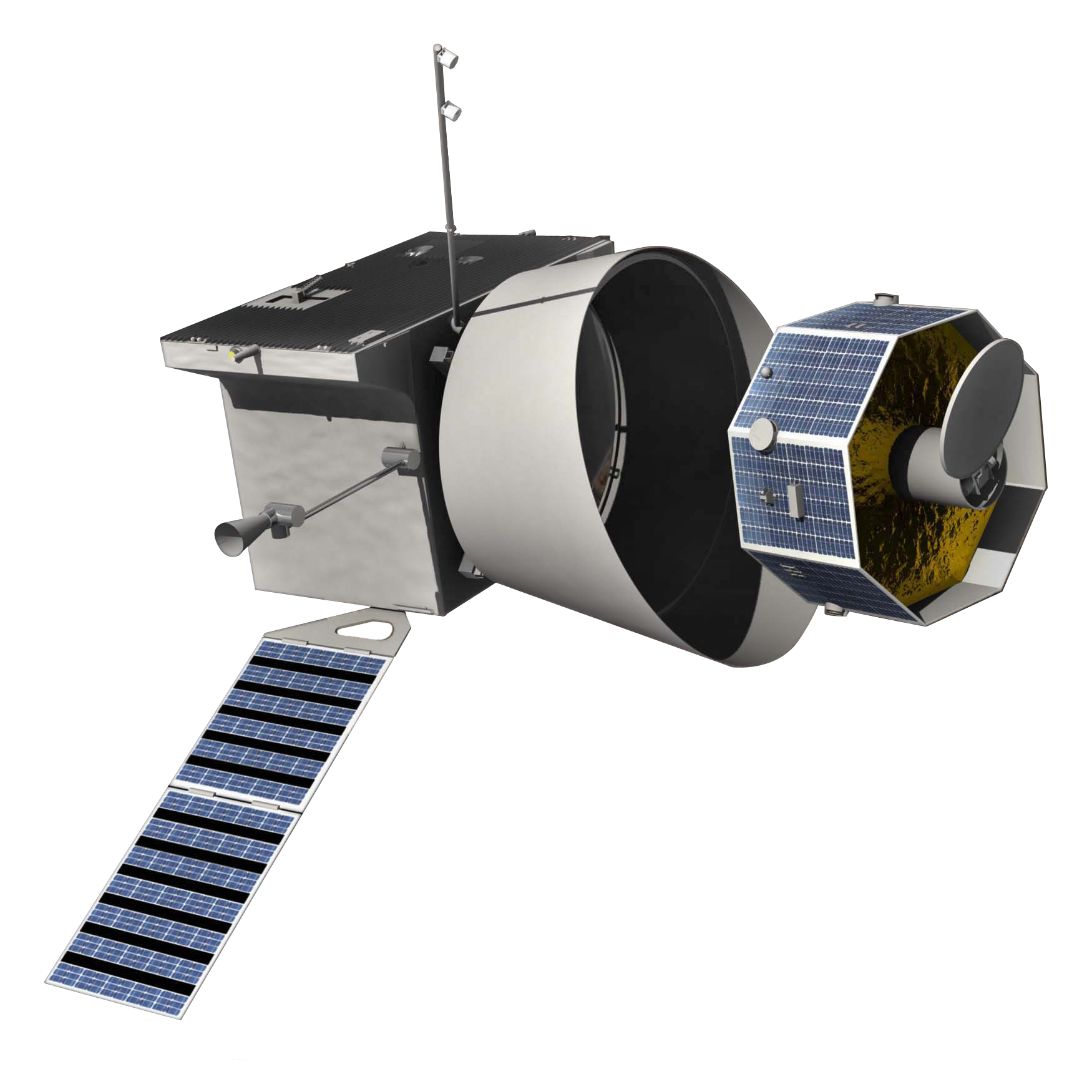
Illustration of BepiColombo

=== Cornerstone missions ===
- Cornerstone 1 – SOHO, launched December 1995, operational – Joint ESA–NASA Solar observation mission providing real-time data for space weather forecasting.
- Cornerstone 1 – Cluster, launched June 1996, failed – Earth observation mission using four identical spacecraft to study the planet's magnetosphere. Failed on launch.
  - Re-launch – Cluster II, launched July and August 2000, completed – Successful replacement mission.
- Cornerstone 2 – XMM-Newton, launched December 1999, operational – An X-ray space telescope, studying the full range of cosmic X-ray sources.
- Cornerstone 3 – Rosetta, launched March 2004, completed – 67P/Churyumov–Gerasimenko orbiter mission, studying comets and their evolution.
- Cornerstone 4 – Herschel, launched May 2009, completed – Infrared space observatory mission for general astronomy.

=== Medium-sized missions ===
- Medium 1 – Huygens, launched October 1997, completed – Titan lander component of the Cassini–Huygens mission; first landing in the outer solar system.
- Medium 2 – INTEGRAL, launched October 2002, completed – Gamma ray space observatory, also capable of observing X-ray and visible wavelengths.
- Medium 3 – Planck, launched May 2009, completed – Cosmology mission that mapped the cosmic microwave background and its anisotropies.

=== Horizon 2000+ ===
- Mission 1 – Gaia, launched December 2013, completed – Astrometry mission measuring positions and distances of over one billion objects in the Milky Way.
- Mission 2 – LISA Pathfinder, launched December 2015, completed – Demonstration of technologies for the Cosmic Vision LISA Gravitational-wave observatory mission.
- Mission 3 – BepiColombo, launched October 2018, operational – Joint ESA–JAXA reconnaissance mission to Mercury, using two unique spacecraft operating respectively.

== Cosmic Vision Programme ==
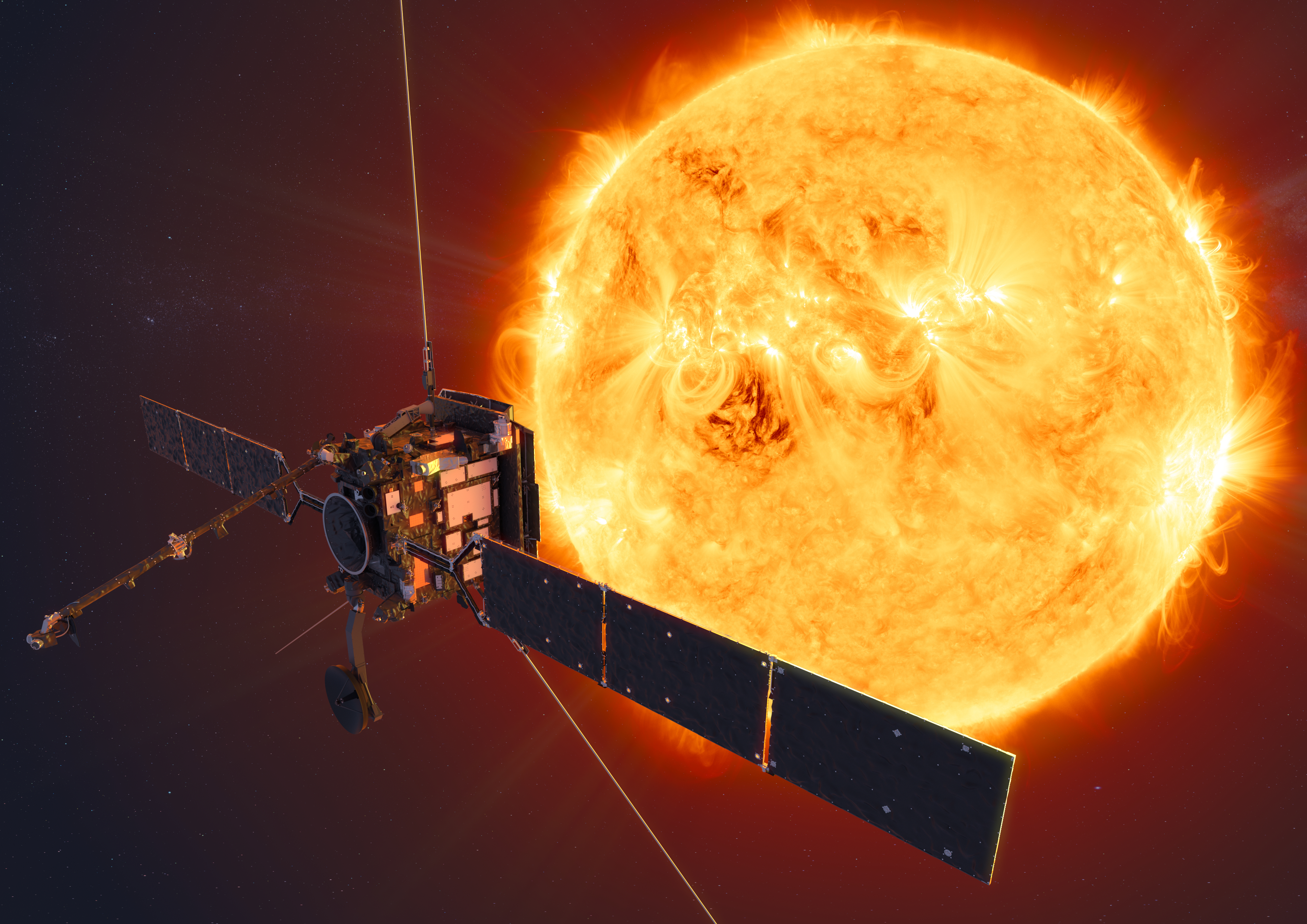
Artist's impression of the Solar Orbiter orbiting the Sun

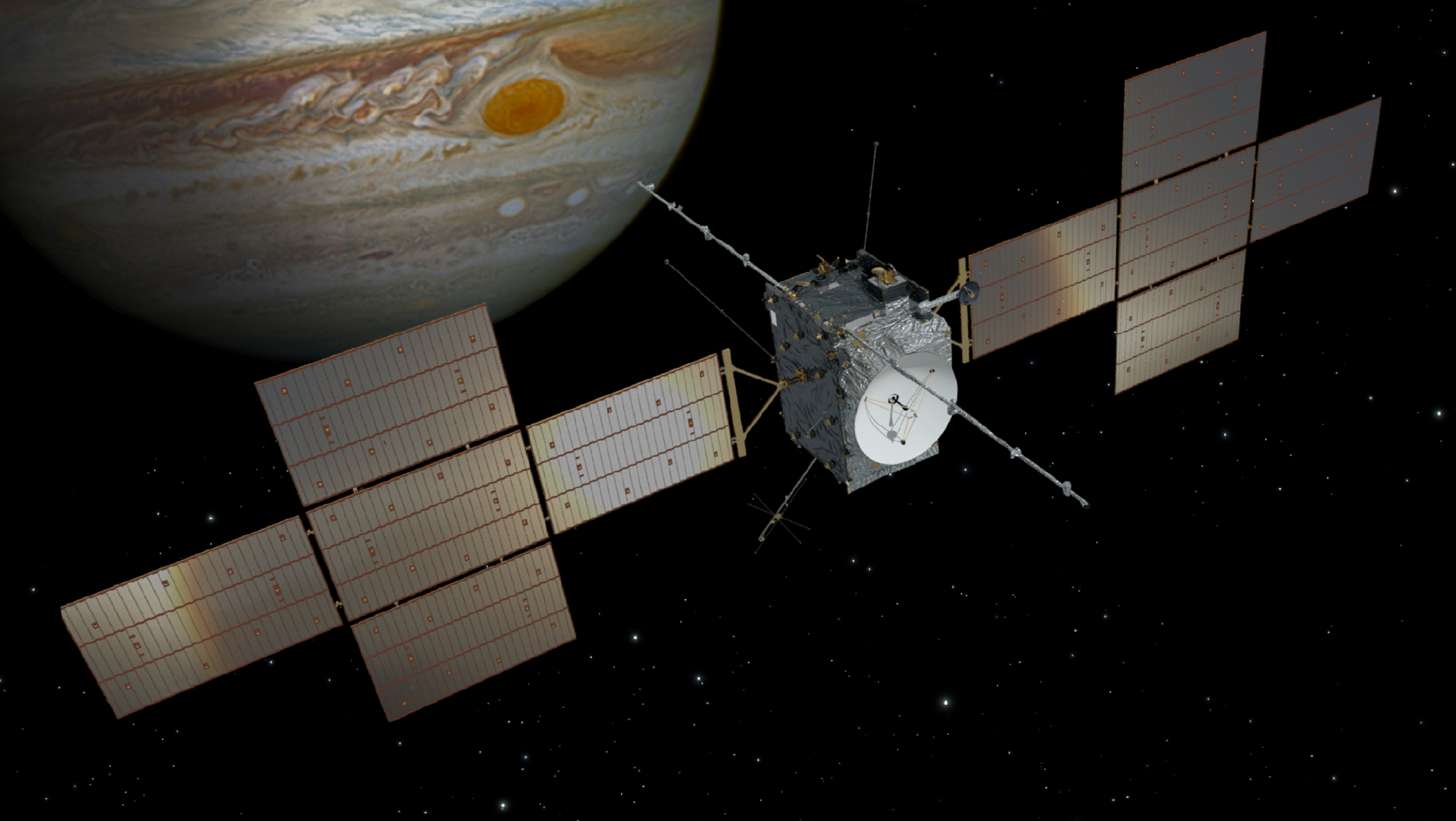
Illustration of the Juice spacecraft at Jupiter

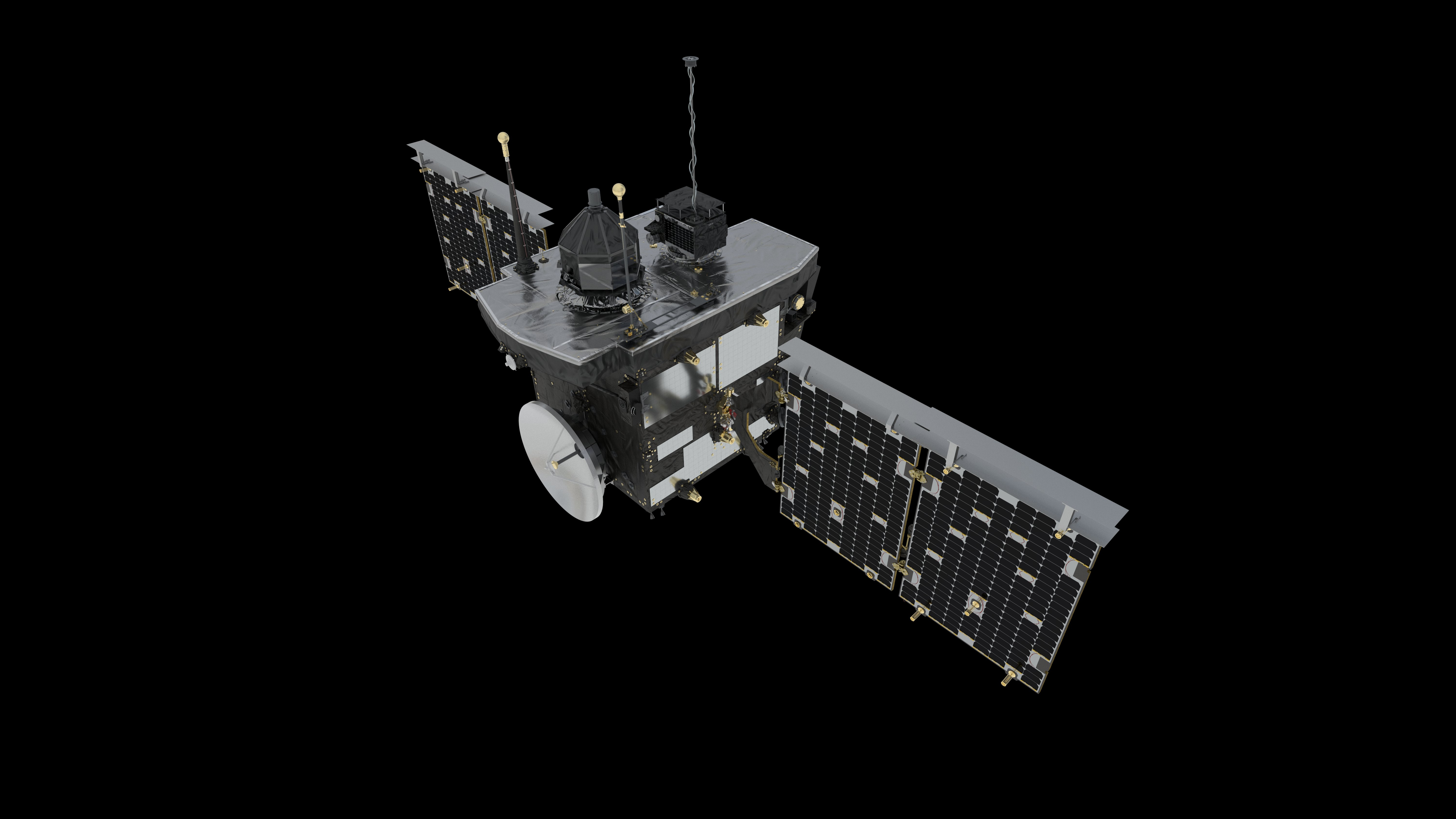
Artist's impression of Comet Interceptor

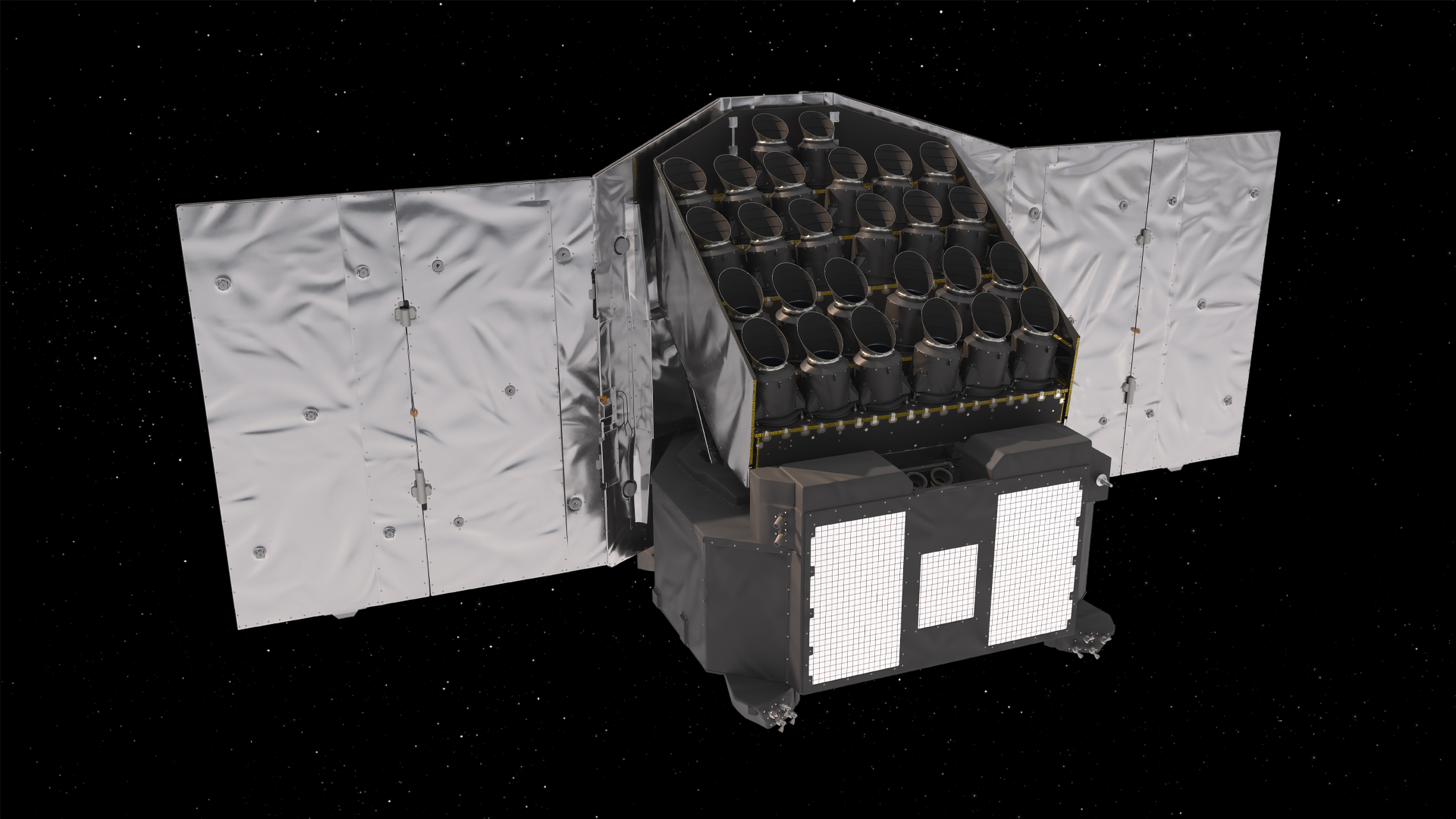
Artist's impression of PLATO

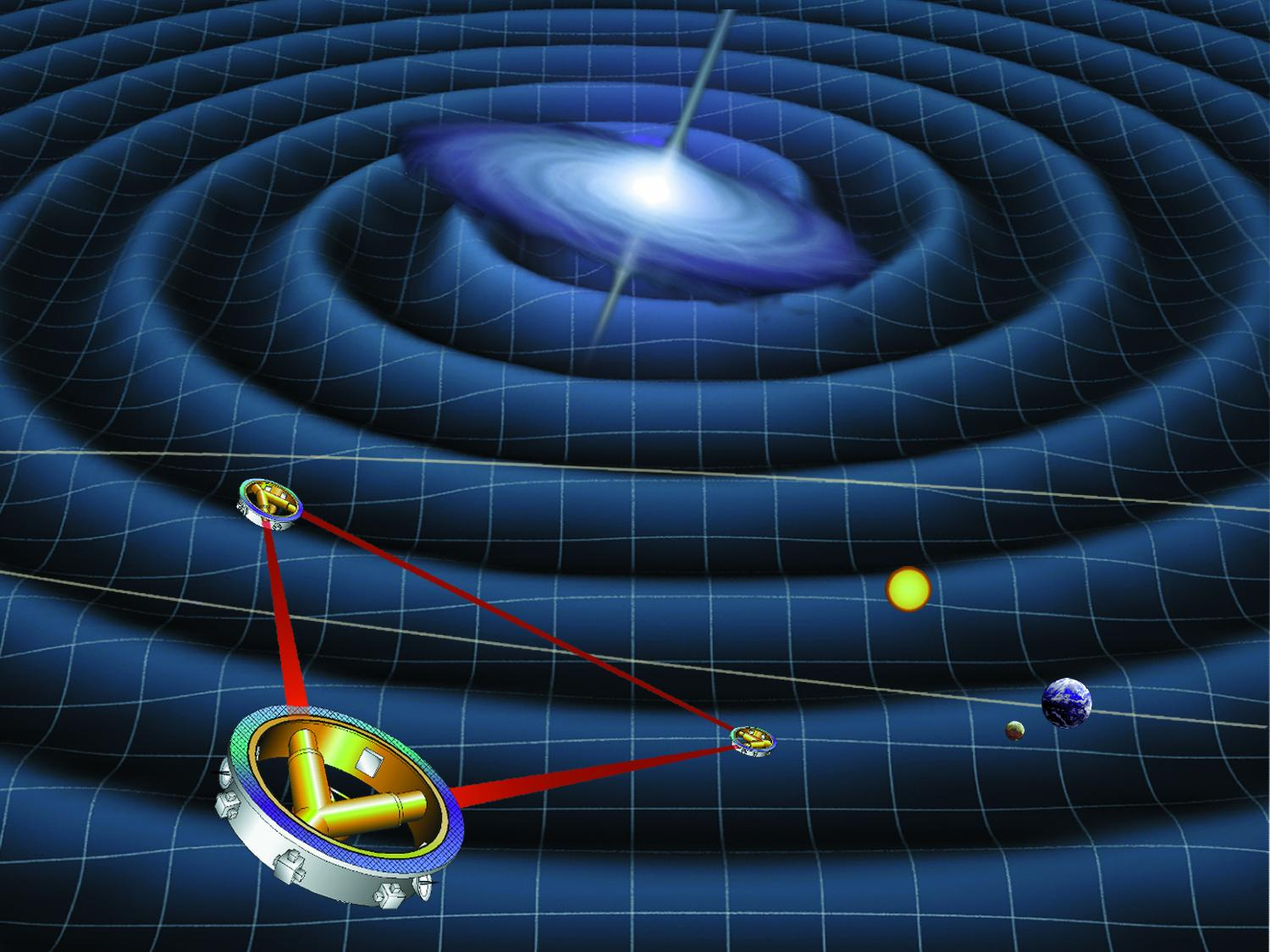
Artist's conception of LISA spacecraft

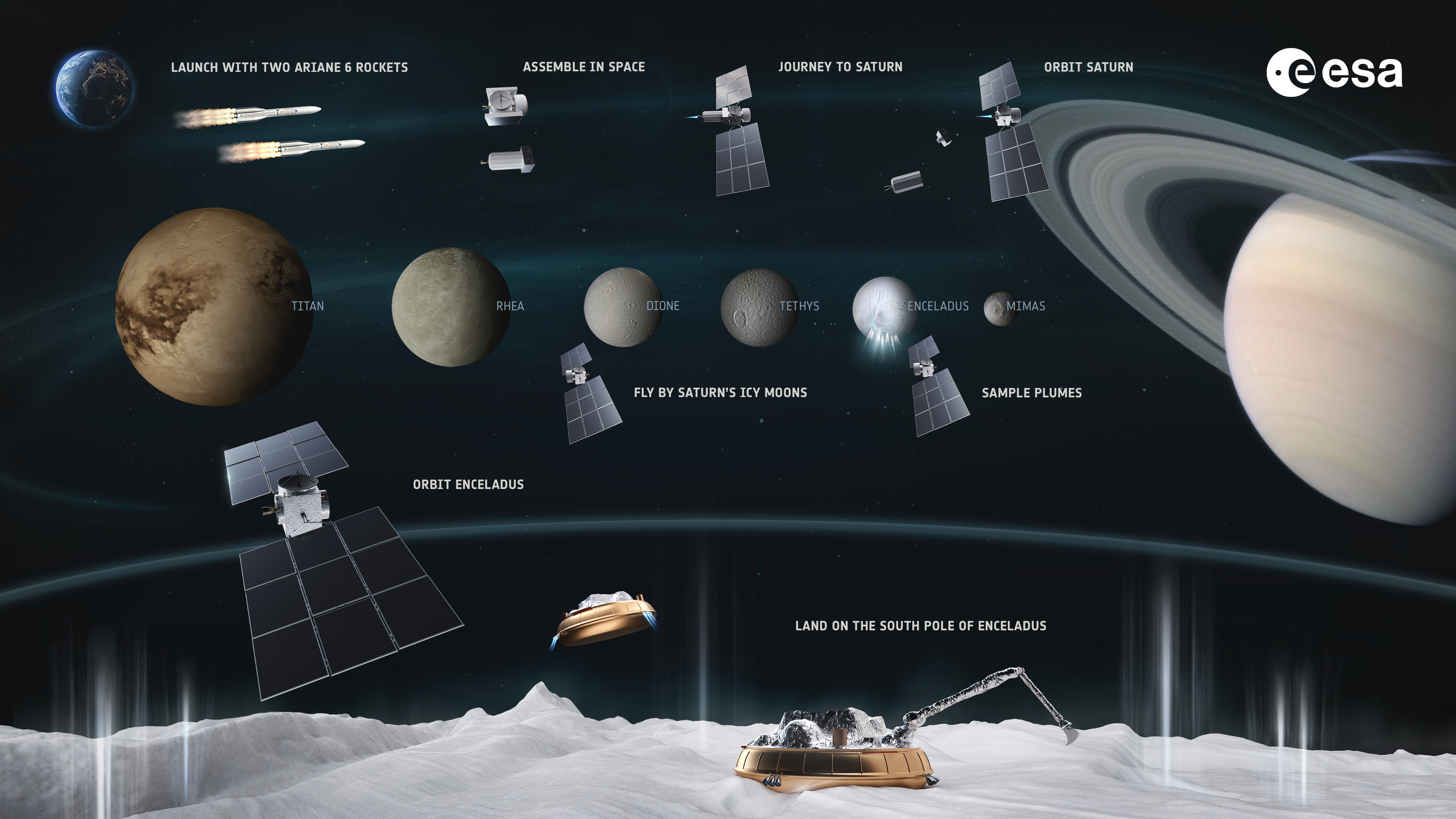
Enceladus mission (Voyage 2050 L4)

=== S-class missions ===
- S1 – CHEOPS, launched December 2019, operational – space telescope mission focused on studying known exoplanets.
- S2 – SMILE, launched May 2026, operational – Joint ESA–CAS Earth observation mission, studying the interaction between the planet's magnetosphere and solar wind.

=== M-class missions ===
- M1 – Solar Orbiter, launched February 2020, operational – Solar observatory mission, designed to perform in-situ studies of the Sun at a perihelion of 0.28 astronomical units.
- M2 – Euclid, launched July 2023, operational – Visible and near-infrared space observatory mission focused on dark matter and dark energy.
- M3 – PLATO, launching 2027, future – Kepler-like space observatory mission, aimed at discovering and observing exoplanets.
- M4 – ARIEL, launching 2031, future – Planck-based space observatory mission studying the atmosphere of known exoplanets.
- M5 – EnVision, launching 2031, future – Venus mapping orbiter mission.

=== L-class missions ===
- L1 – Juice, launched April 2023 with an orbital insertion in July 2031, operational (in transit) – Jupiter orbiter mission, focused on studying the Galilean moons Europa, Ganymede and Callisto.
- L2 – Athena, launching 2037, future – X-ray space observatory mission, designed as a successor to the XMM-Newton telescope.
- L3 – LISA, launching 2035, future – the first dedicated gravitational wave space observatory mission.

=== F-class missions ===
- F1 – Comet Interceptor, launching in 2028 or 2029, future – Comet flyby mission.
- F2 – ARRAKIHS, launching in the early 2030s, future – Survey of one hundred nearby galaxies and their surroundings to investigate dwarf galaxies and stellar streams.

== Voyage 2050 ==
The Voyage 2050 programme is the successor to the Cosmic Vision programme within ESA's Science Programme for the period 2035–2050.

=== M-class missions ===
- M7 – Plasma Observatory, launching in 2037, future (proposed) – Multi-spacecraft space weather mission.

=== L-class missions ===
- L4 – Enceladus mission, launching in 2042, future (proposed) – Fly-bys of Saturn's icy moons, sampling of Enceladus's plumes, orbiting Enceladus, and landing on Enceladus.

== FutureEO ==
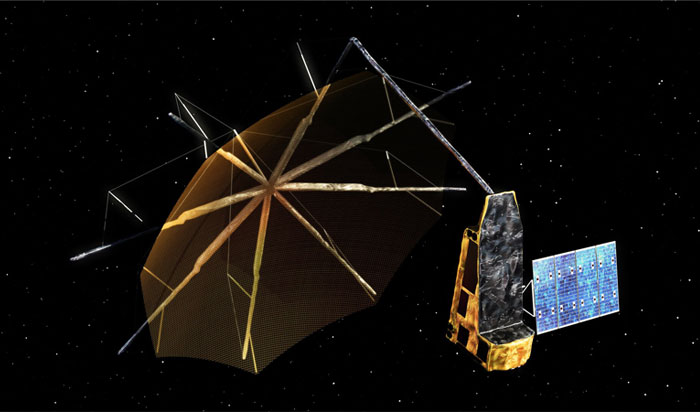
Artist’s impression of the Biomass satellite

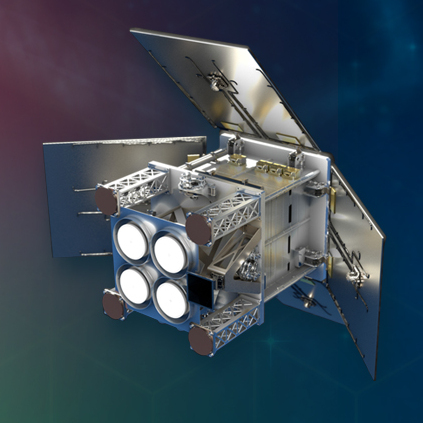
Illustration of the HydroGNSS satellite

=== Earth Explorer missions ===
- Earth Explorer 1 – GOCE, launched March 2009, completed – Gravimetry mission, aimed at accurately mapping Earth's gravity field.
- Earth Explorer 2 – SMOS, launched November 2009, operational – Climatology mission, focused on studying Earth's water cycle and climate.
- Earth Explorer 3 – CryoSat-2, launched April 2010, operational – Environmental science and glaciology mission, focused on studying Earth's polar ice caps. Successful relaunch of the failed CryoSat mission.
- Earth Explorer 4 – Swarm, launched November 2013, operational – Magnetosphere mission, carried out by a trio of spacecraft launched to study Earth's magnetic field.
- Earth Explorer 5 – ADM-Aeolus, launched August 2018, completed – Meteorology mission, performed by a spacecraft equipped to create global wind component profiles to aid more advanced weather forecasting.
- Earth Explorer 6 – EarthCARE, launched May 2024, operational – Joint ESA-JAXA meteorology and climatology mission, aimed at the characterization of clouds and aerosols, along with measurements of reflected and emitted radiation from Earth's surface.
- Earth Explorer 7 – Biomass, launched in April 2025, operational – Ecology mission, studying the carbon cycle and forest ecology, observing the development of forests and their characteristics.
- Earth Explorer 8 – FLEX, launched in September 2026, operational – Biology mission, aimed at measuring the amount of chlorophyll fluorescence in terrestrial vegetation.
- Earth Explorer 9 – FORUM, launching 2027, future – Climatology mission, aimed at measuring far-infrared outgoing radiation emissions in order to understand Earth's surface temperature regulation.
- Earth Explorer 10 – Harmony, launching 2029, future – Formation flying synthetic aperture radar mission.
- Earth Explorer 11 – Wivern, launching NET 2032, future – Wind Velocity Radar Nephoscope; a mission to measure cloud wind velocity, rain, snow, and ice water via a Doppler weather radar nephoscope, in order to improve weather forecast models.

=== Scout missions ===
Scout missions, launching 2025 onward, are a series of small Earth observation satellites complementing the Earth Explorer missions.

- Scout 1 – CubeMAP, cancelled – quantifying processes in the upper-atmosphere
- Scout 2 – HydroGNSS, launched in 2025, operational – two identical satellites sensing Galileo and GPS signals reflected by Earth's surface for improving the knowledge of Earth's hydrological cycle
- Scout 3 – NanoMagSat, launching in 2027, future – measuring the ionospheric environment, monitoring Earth’s magnetic field
- Scout 4 – Tango, future – monitoring three greenhouse gases: methane, carbon dioxide and nitrogen dioxide being emitted from large industrial sites
- Hibidis, future – monitoring Essential Biodiversity Variables with hyperspectral imaging
- SOVA-S, future – studying atmospheric gravity waves in order to improve climate and space weather modelling

=== Phi-sats ===
- Phi-Sat-1, launched in 2020, operational – technology demonstration cubesat
- Phi-Sat-2, launched in 2024, operational – technology demonstration cubesat

== Space Safety Programme (S2P) ==
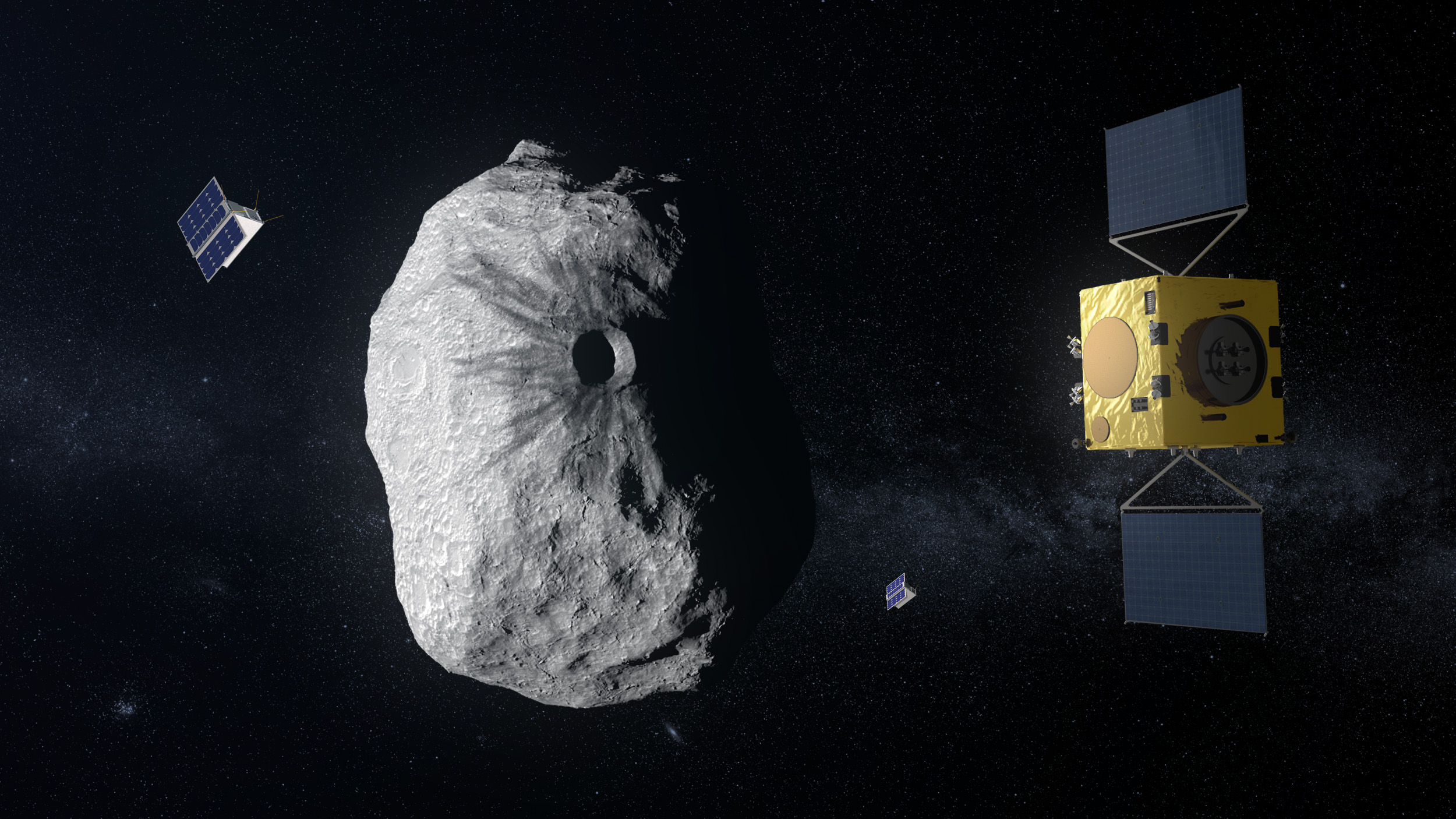
Artist's impression of Hera in orbit around Didymos

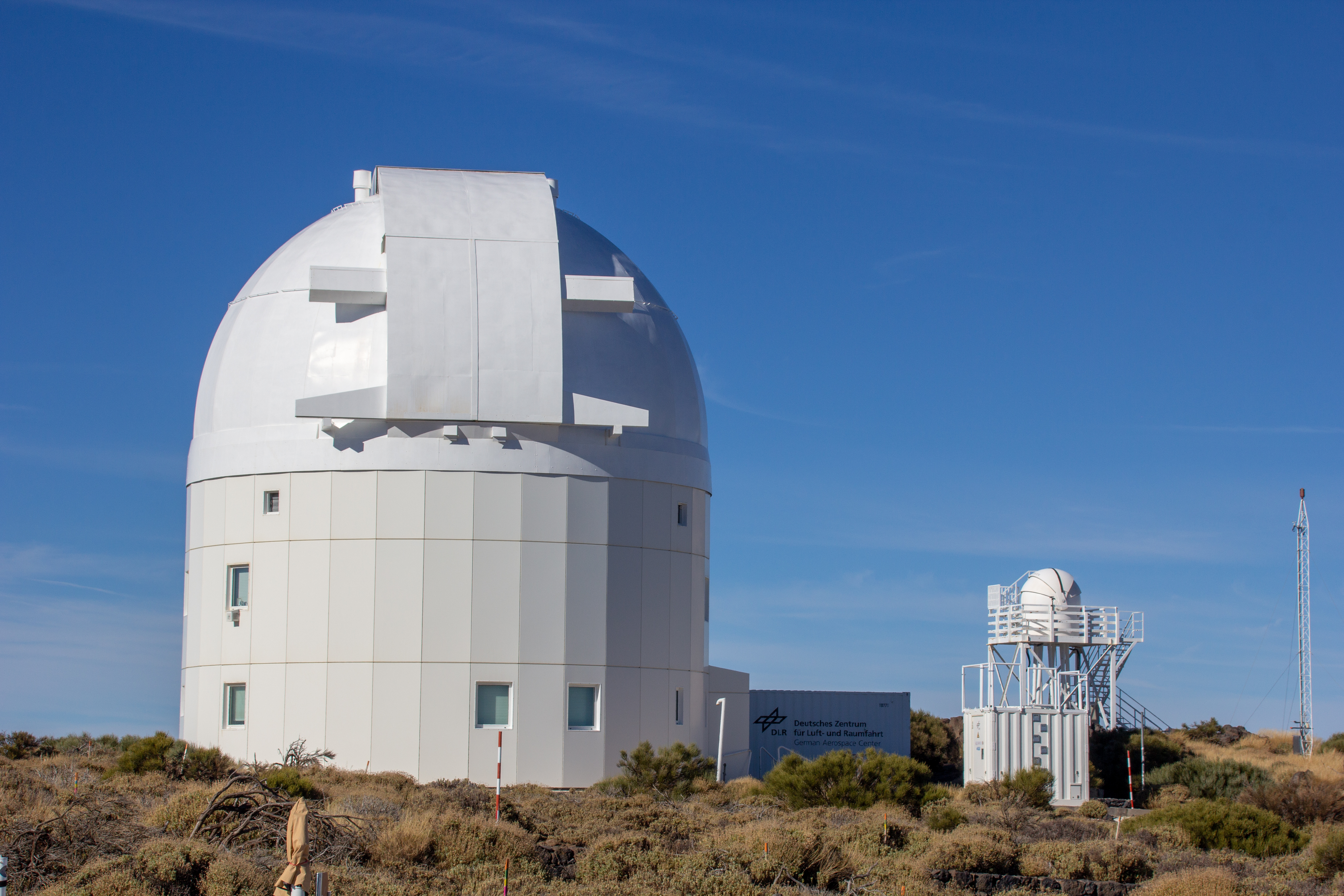
ESA Optical Ground Station

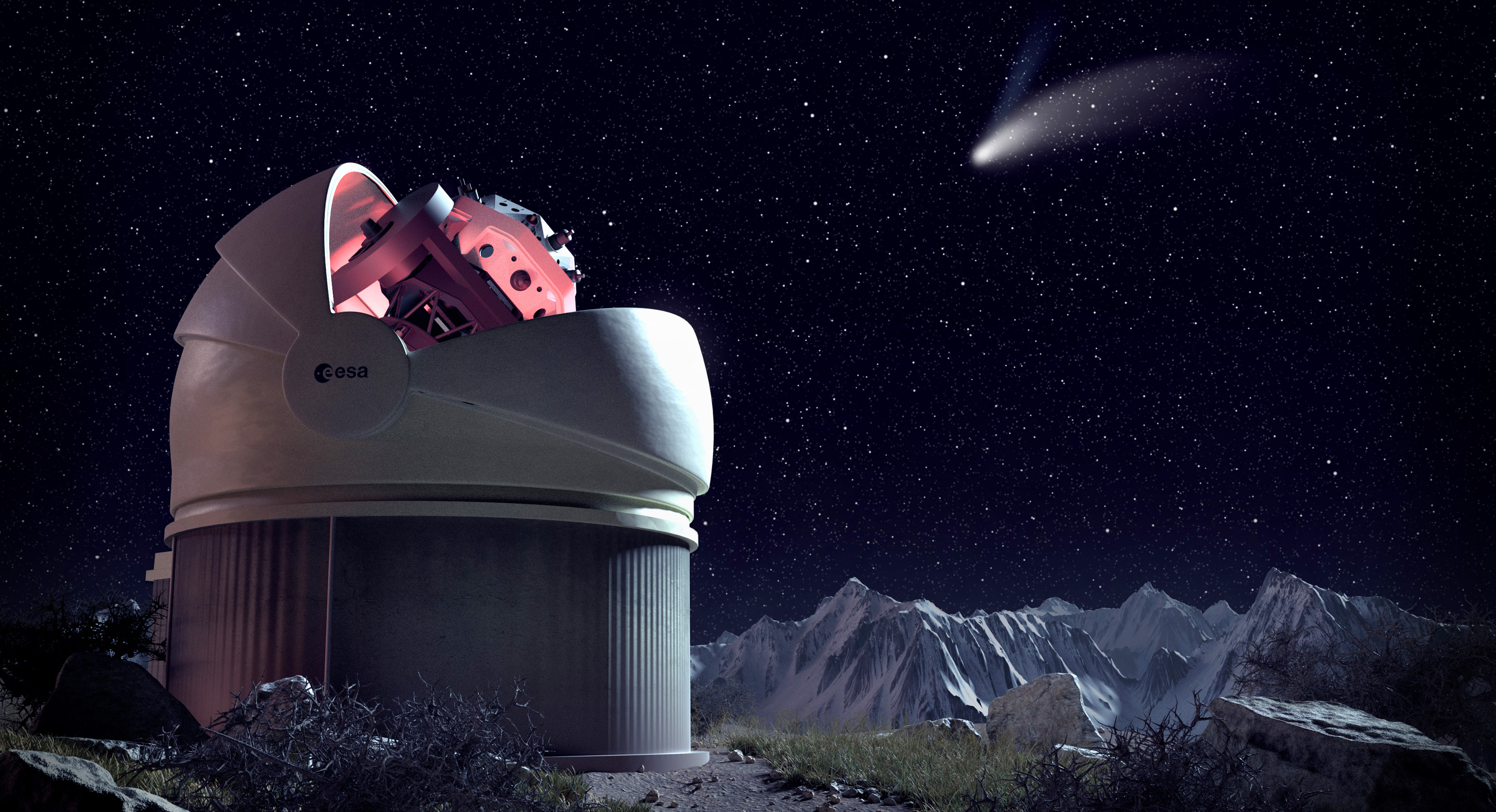
Artist's impression of the Flyeye telescope

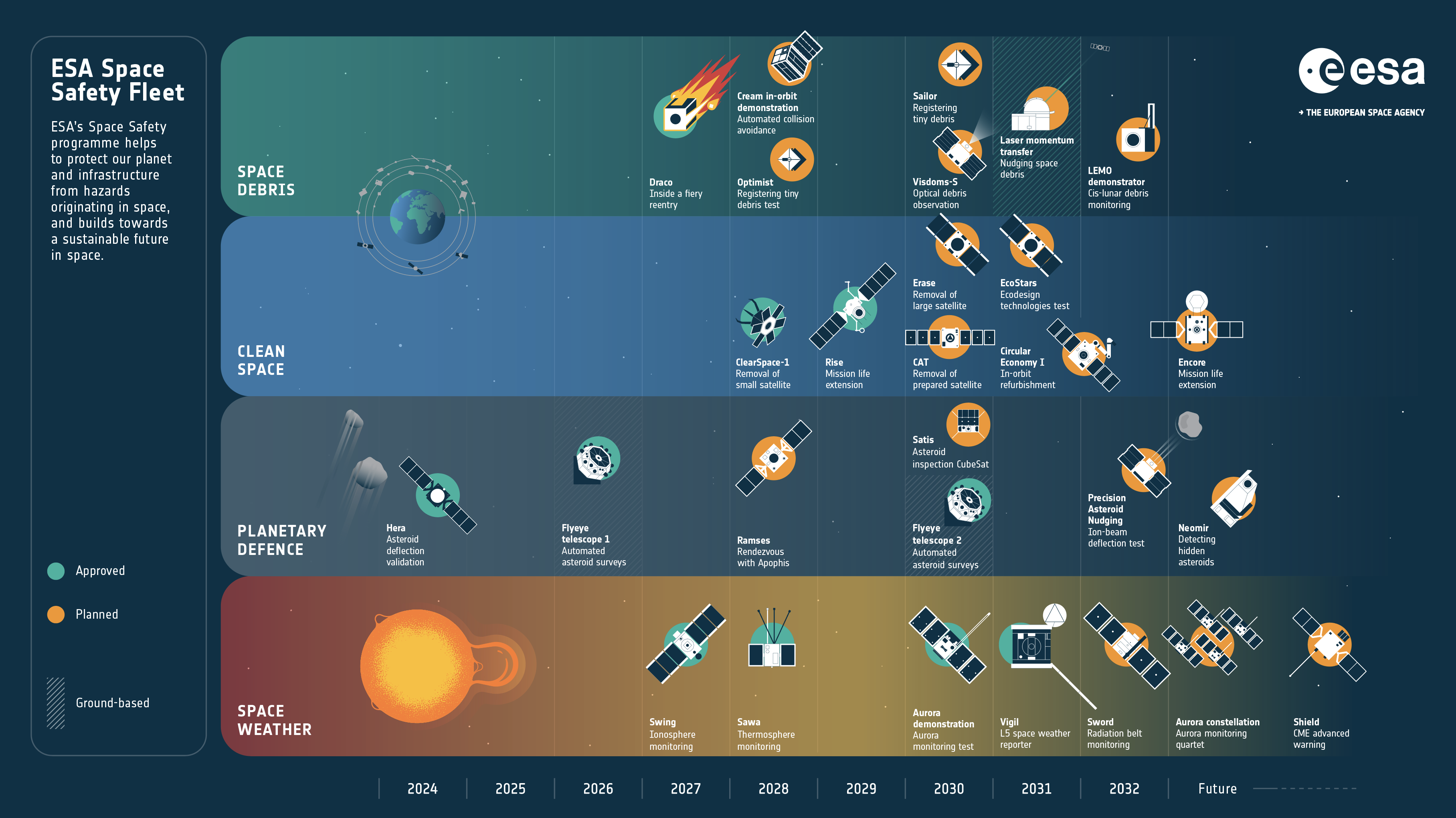
ESA S2P fleet proposed at 2025 Ministerial Conference

- Hera, launched in October 2024, operational – European asteroid probe aimed at studying the effects of a NEO's impact created by NASA's DART mission using 65803 Didymos's moon (Dimorphos) as a target
- Draco, launching in 2027, future – small space capsule monitoring the breakup and demise processes of a re-entering satellite
- SWING, launching in 2027, future – ionosphere monitoring mission
- PRELUDE, launching in 2027, future – in-orbit demonstration of space manoeuvres and relative navigation technologies for active debris removal
- SAWA, launching in 2028, future – thermosphere monitoring mission
- Ramses, launching in April 2028, future – mission to the near-Earth asteroid 99942 Apophis
- ClearSpace-1, launching in 2030, future – space debris removal demonstration mission with the objective of deorbiting PROBA-1
- CREAM in-orbit demonstration, launch planned for 2028, future – automated collision avoidance demonstration mission
- OPTIMIST, launch planned for 2028, future (proposed) – registering tiny space debris test
- RISE, launching in 2029, future – in-orbit servicing demonstration mission
- Aurora-D & Aurora-C, first launch planned for 2030, future (proposed) – a demonstrator satellite and a satellite constellation for Auroral oval monitoring
- SAILOR, future (proposed) – space debris monitoring satellites using solar sail-like foils as impact detectors
- Visdoms-S, launch planned for 2030, future – optical observation of space debris
- Satis, launch planned for 2030, future (proposed) – cubesat mission an asteroid
- CAT (CApTure Payload Bay), launch planned for 2030, future – joint ESA-AEE mission to test a standardised docking interface for satellite removal
- ERASE, launch planned for 2030, future (proposed) – removal of a large satellite
- Vigil, launching in 2031, future – space weather mission to the Sun-Earth Lagrange point 5
- Ecostars, launch planned for 2031, future (proposed) – Ecodesign technologies test
- Circular Economy I, launch planned for 2031, future (proposed) – in-orbit refurbishment mission
- LEMO demonstrator, launch planned for 2032, future (proposed) – cis-lunar debris monitoring mission
- Precision Asteroid Nudging, launch planned for 2032, future (proposed) – ion-beam asteroid deflection test
- SWORD, launching in 2032, future (proposed) – two satellites in GTO-like orbit monitoring Earth's radiation belts
- NEOMIR, launch planned for 2030s, future (proposed) – asteroid-detecting space telescope in the Sun-Earth L1 point
- SHIELD, launch planned for 2030s, future (proposed) – CME advanced warning mission
- ENCORE, launch planned for 2030s, future (proposed) – mission life extension
- e.Deorbit, cancelled – space debris removal demonstration mission, superseded by ClearSpace-1

=== Earth-based activities of S2P ===
- Optical Ground Station (OGS), operational – observatory at Teide Observatory
- Izaña-1 and Izaña-2, since 2022, operational – laser-ranging stations at Teide Observatory for tracking satellites and space debris
- Flyeye, first light in 2025, operational – network of ground-based telescopes for NEO early warning

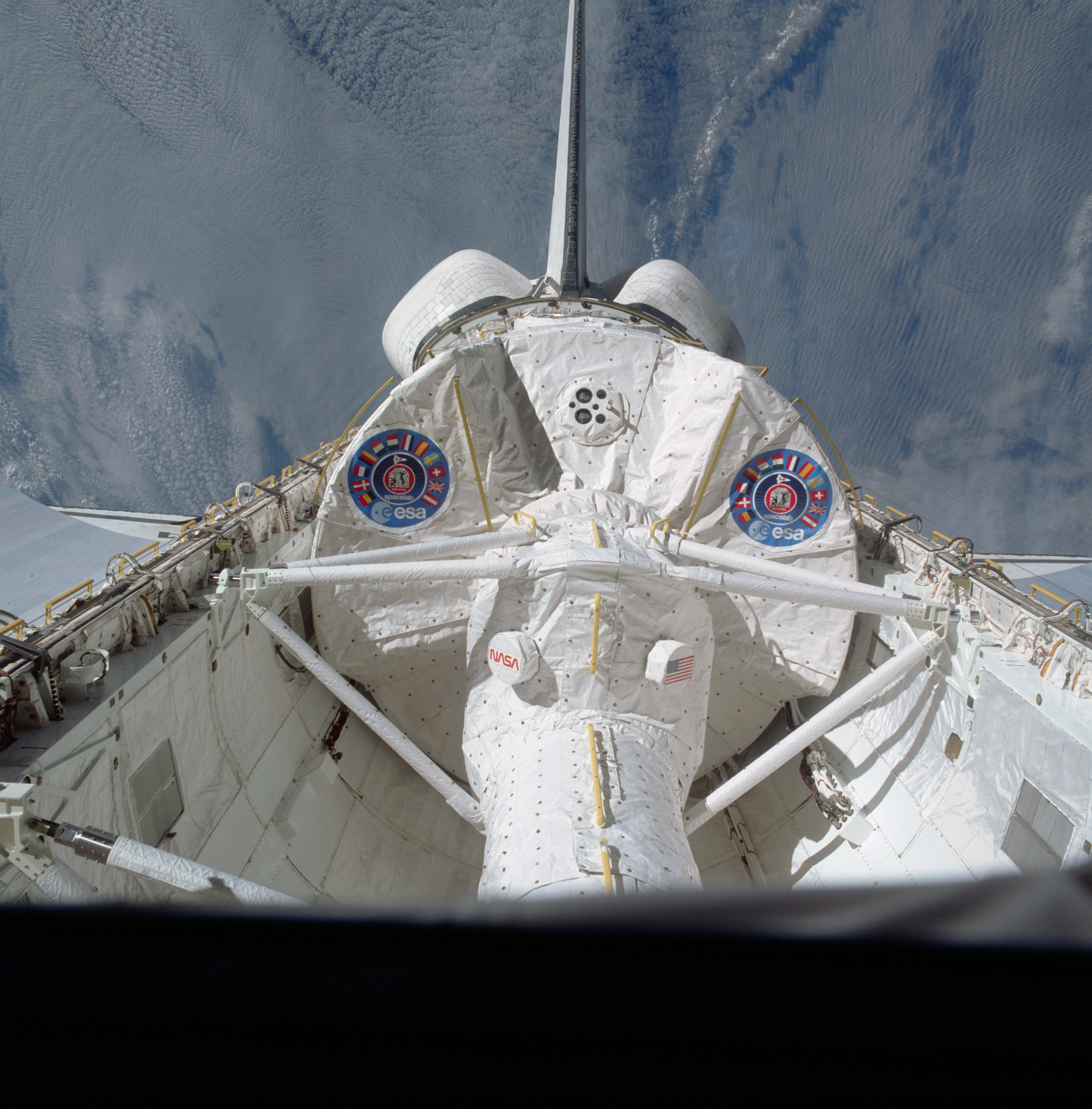
Shuttle Columbia during STS-9 with Spacelab Module LM1 and tunnel in its cargo bay

== Human spaceflight ==
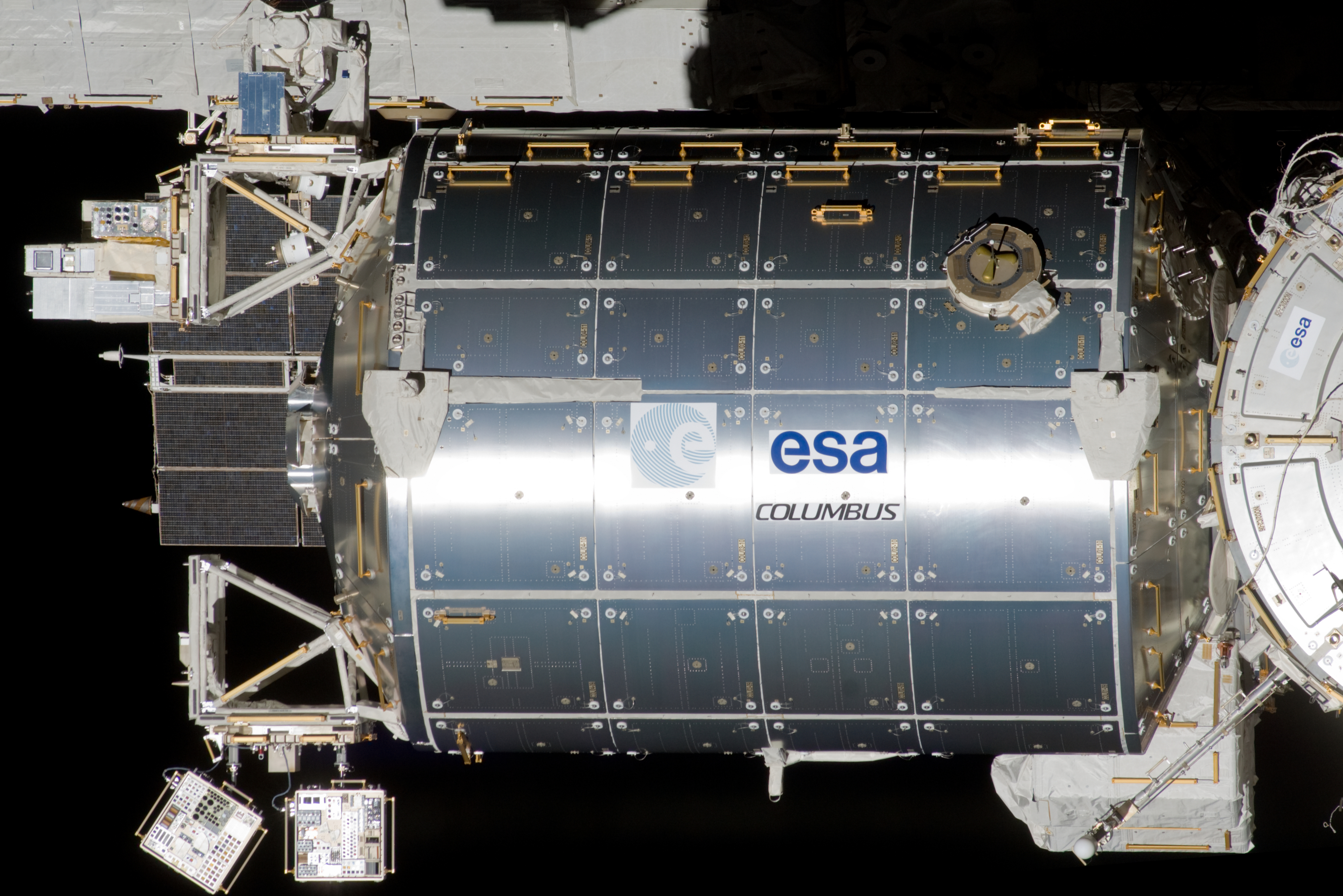
Columbus (ISS module)

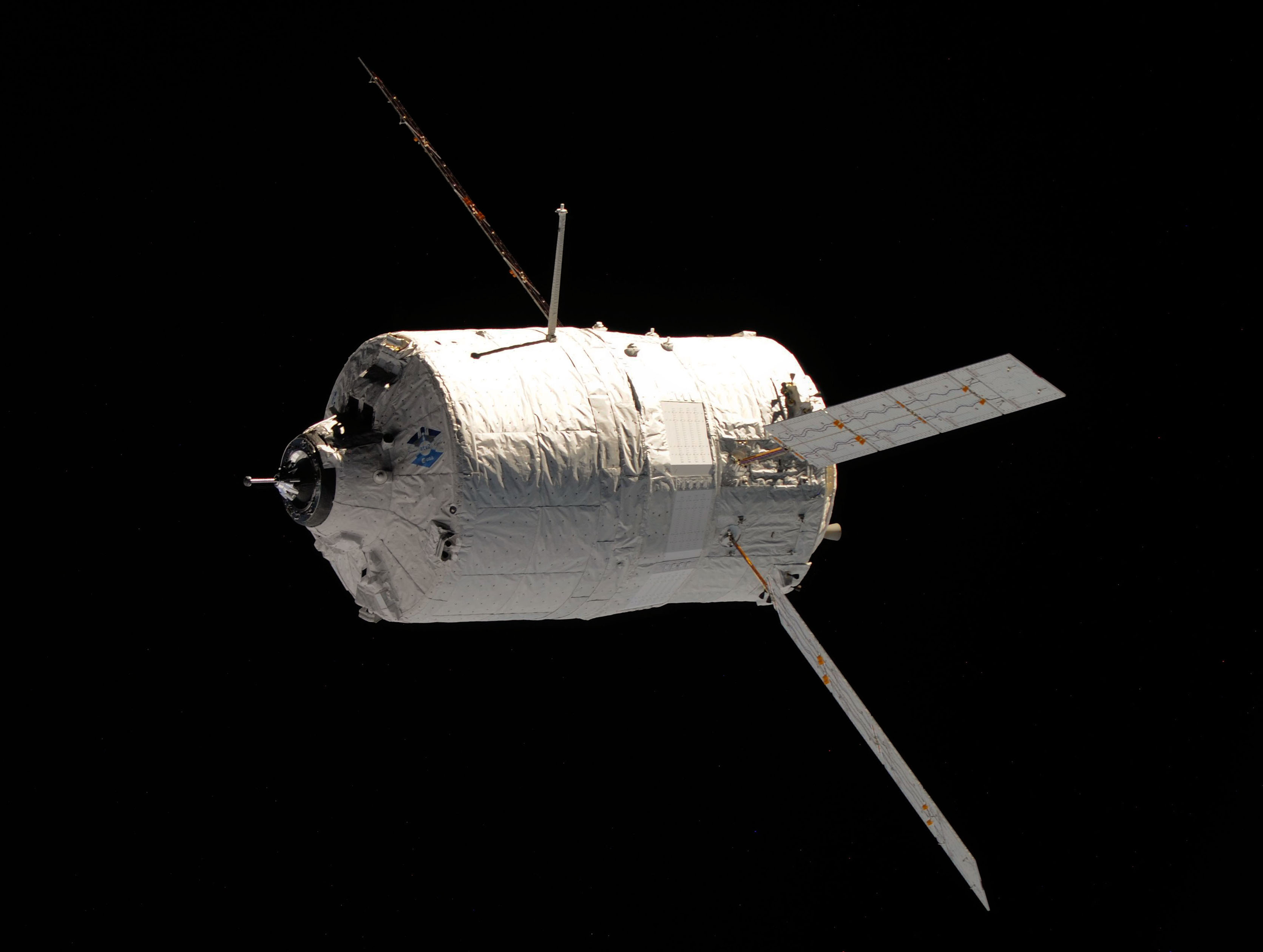
ESA's Johannes Kepler Automated Transfer Vehicle-2

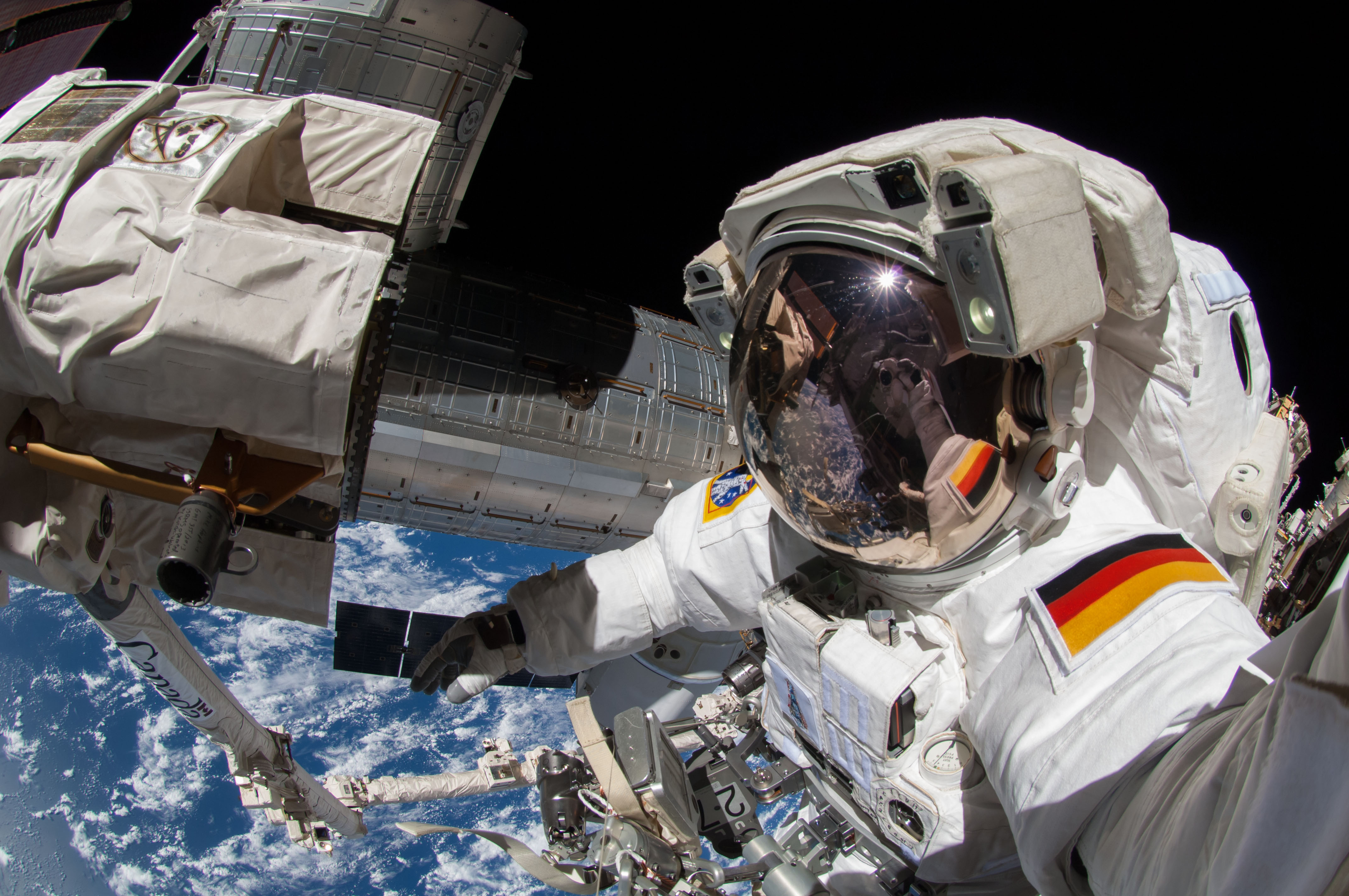
German ESA astronaut Alexander Gerst on EVA as part of Expedition 41

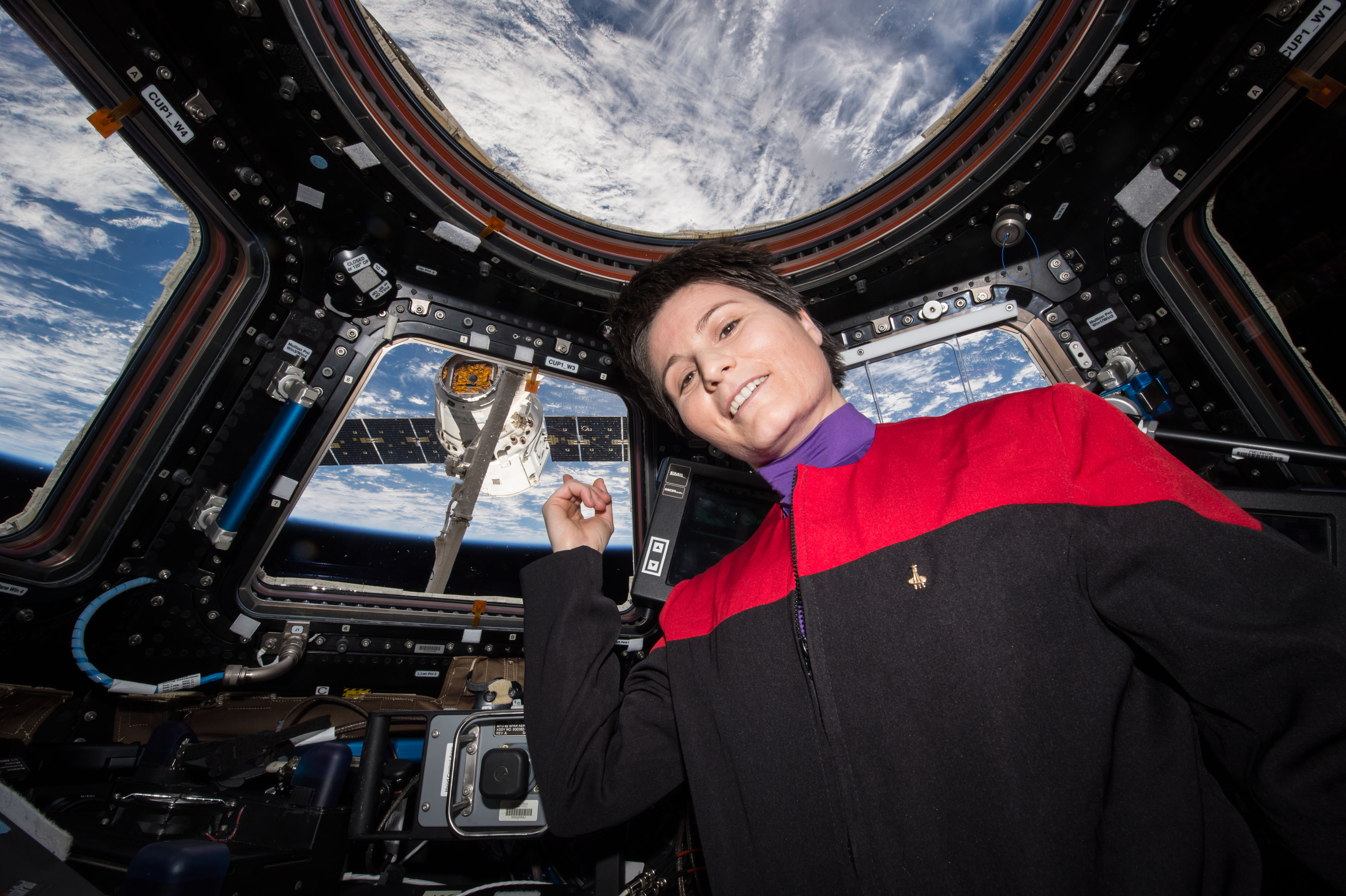
Italian ESA astronaut Samantha Cristoforetti in Star Trek uniform in the ISS Cupola with a view of Dragon CRS-6

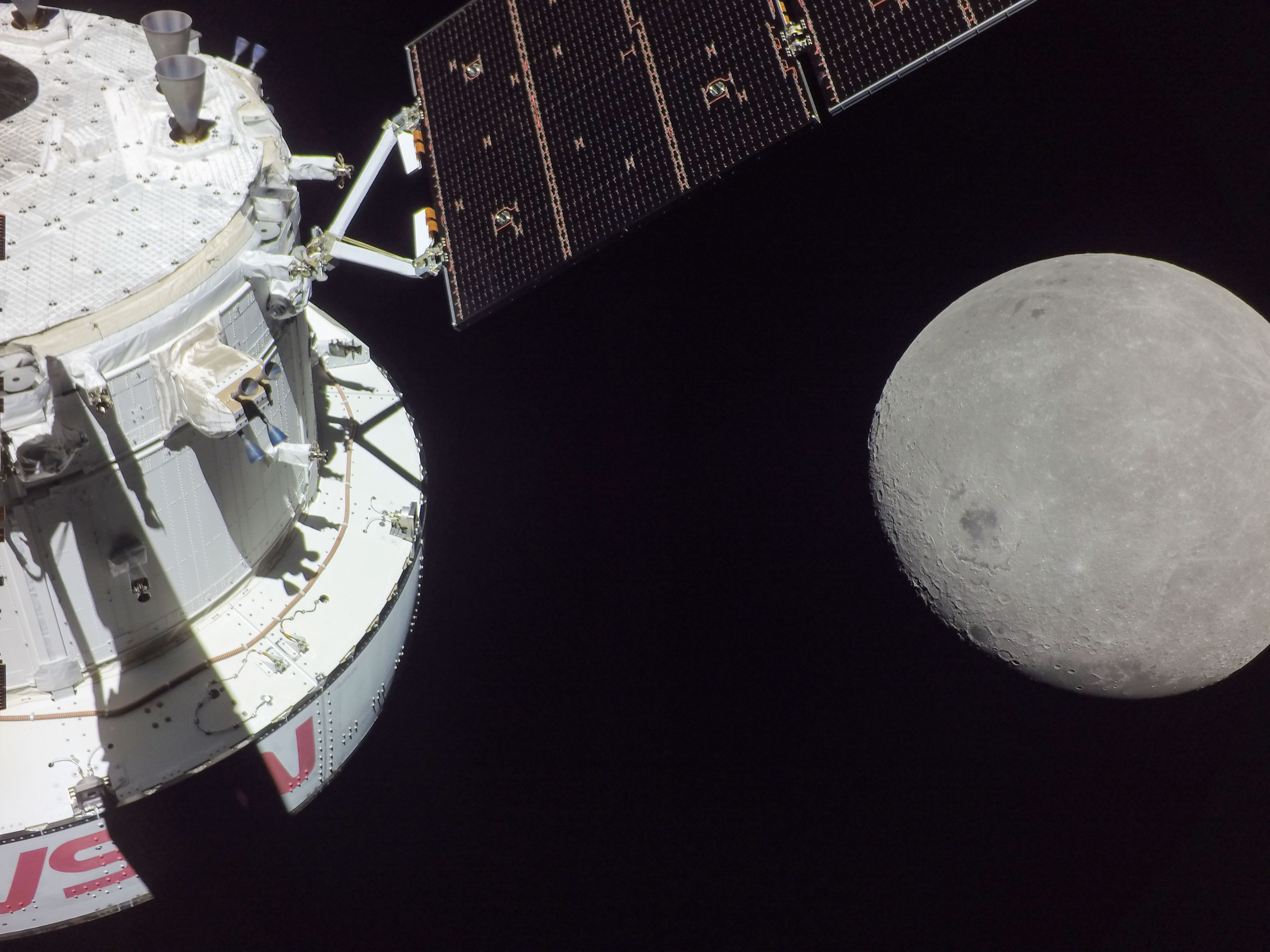
Orion and ESM approach Moon on the Artemis 1 mission

- European Astronaut Corps, since 1983, operational – selects, trains, and provides European astronauts as crew members on NASA and Roscosmos space missions
- Spacelab, launched between 1983 and 1998, completed – a reusable crewed laboratory developed by ESA and used on certain flights of the Space Shuttle
- Euromir, launched in 1994 and 1995, completed – ESA astronaut missions to the Mir space station
- ESA contribution to the International Space Station (ISS), since 2001, operational
  - Columbus, launched in February 2008, operational – a crewed laboratory module
  - Columbus External Payload Facility, launched in February 2008, operational – two platforms for external payloads attached to the starboard cone of Columbus
  - Bartolomeo, launched in April 2020, operational – a platform for external payloads attached to Columbus
  - Automated Transfer Vehicle (ATV), launched between 2008 and 2015, completed – an expendable cargo spacecraft
  - Cupola, launched in February 2010, operational – an ESA-built observatory module
  - European Robotic Arm (ERA), launched in July 2021, operational – a robotic arm that is attached to the Russian segment of the International Space Station
- European Service Module (ESM), first launched in November 2022, operational – a component of the crewed Orion spacecraft, part of the NASA-led Artemis program
- ESA participation in private missions to ISS, since 2024, operational – ESA astronauts on short-term private flights on Dragon 2
  - Muninn on Axiom Mission 3, launched in January 2024, completed
  - Ignis on Axiom Mission 4, launched in June 2025, completed
  - PAM-6 Mission of Thomas Pesquet, Aleš Svoboda, and Adrianos Golemis launching in 2027, future
  - EPIC (ESA Provided Institutional Crew) mission, future
- ESA contribution to commercial space station programmes, future – ESA intends to use the services of low Earth orbit commercial space stations like Haven-1 or Starlab and to support European industry in supplying major components for these projects
  - Vast-1 mission with Arnaud Prost flying to Haven-1, launching in 2027, future
- LEO Cargo Return Service, operational – a program to develop space capsules capable of resupplying space stations and returning cargo from orbit.
  - Nyx, first launch in 2028, future – reusable cargo space capsule for resupplying space stations
- ESA contribution to the Lunar Gateway, cancelled by NASA in 2026 – an international crewed space station in lunar orbit, part of the NASA-led Artemis program
  - European Radiation Sensors Array (ERSA), cancelled – ESA-built component of the NASA HALO module
  - Lunar I-Hab, cancelled – joint ESA–JAXA habitat module
  - ESPRIT, cancelled – a crewed service module providing refueling, communications equipment, habitation area, and storage + ESA-built communication equipment package (Lunar Link) connected to NASA's HALO module
- Hermes, cancelled – proposed human spaceflight program centered around a CNES-designed reusable spaceplane. Project cancelled in 1992 due to difficulties with achieving financial and scientific goals
- Columbus Man-Tended Free Flyer, cancelled – proposed space station intended to be serviced by the Hermes spaceplane
- Hopper, cancelled – successor concept to Hermes. Cancelled in 2005 after lack of interest
- CSTS, cancelled – former proposed design for a crewed spacecraft for low Earth orbit operations
- Aurora programme, cancelled – ESA human spaceflight programme from 2001

=== Earth-based astronaut activities ===
- AMASE, between 2003 and 2011, completed – expeditions to Mars analogue sites on Svalbard
- Concordia Station, since 2005, operational – all-year research station on the Antarctic Plateau
- CAVES, since 2011, operational – ESA-developed astronaut training field course in caves
- NEEMO, between 2015 and 2019, completed – ESA astronauts participating in NASA-led missions to the Aquarius underwater laboratory
- PANGAEA, since 2016, operational – ESA-developed astronaut training field course focused on geology and astrobiology
- LunAres, since 2017, operational – private Mars and Moon analogue laboratory in Piła, in partnership with ESA and POLSA
- LUNA Analog Facility, since 2024, operational – joint ESA–DLR lunar analogue facility in Cologne

== Launch, reentry, and in-space transport ==
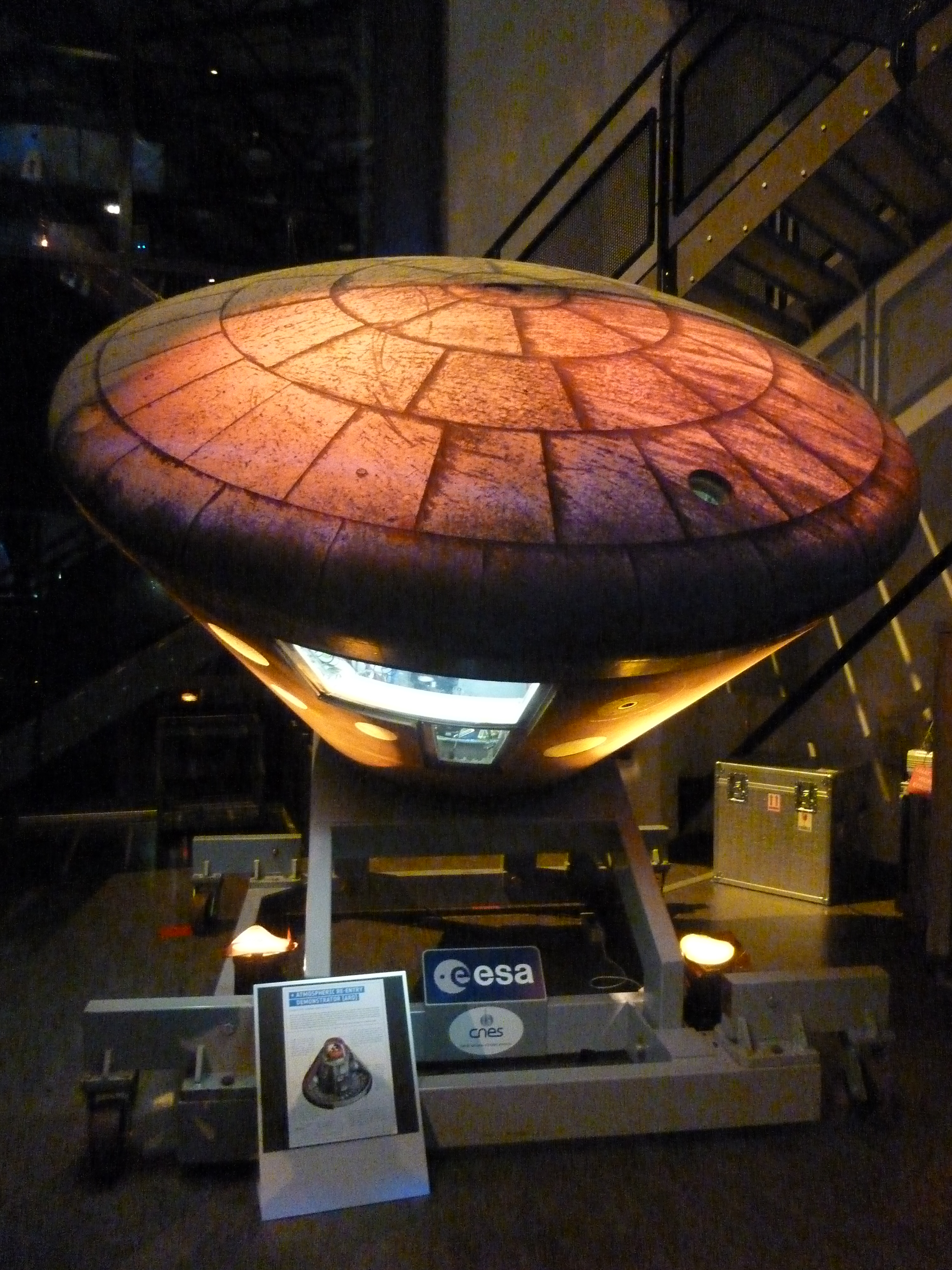
The Atmospheric Reentry Demonstrator at ESTEC

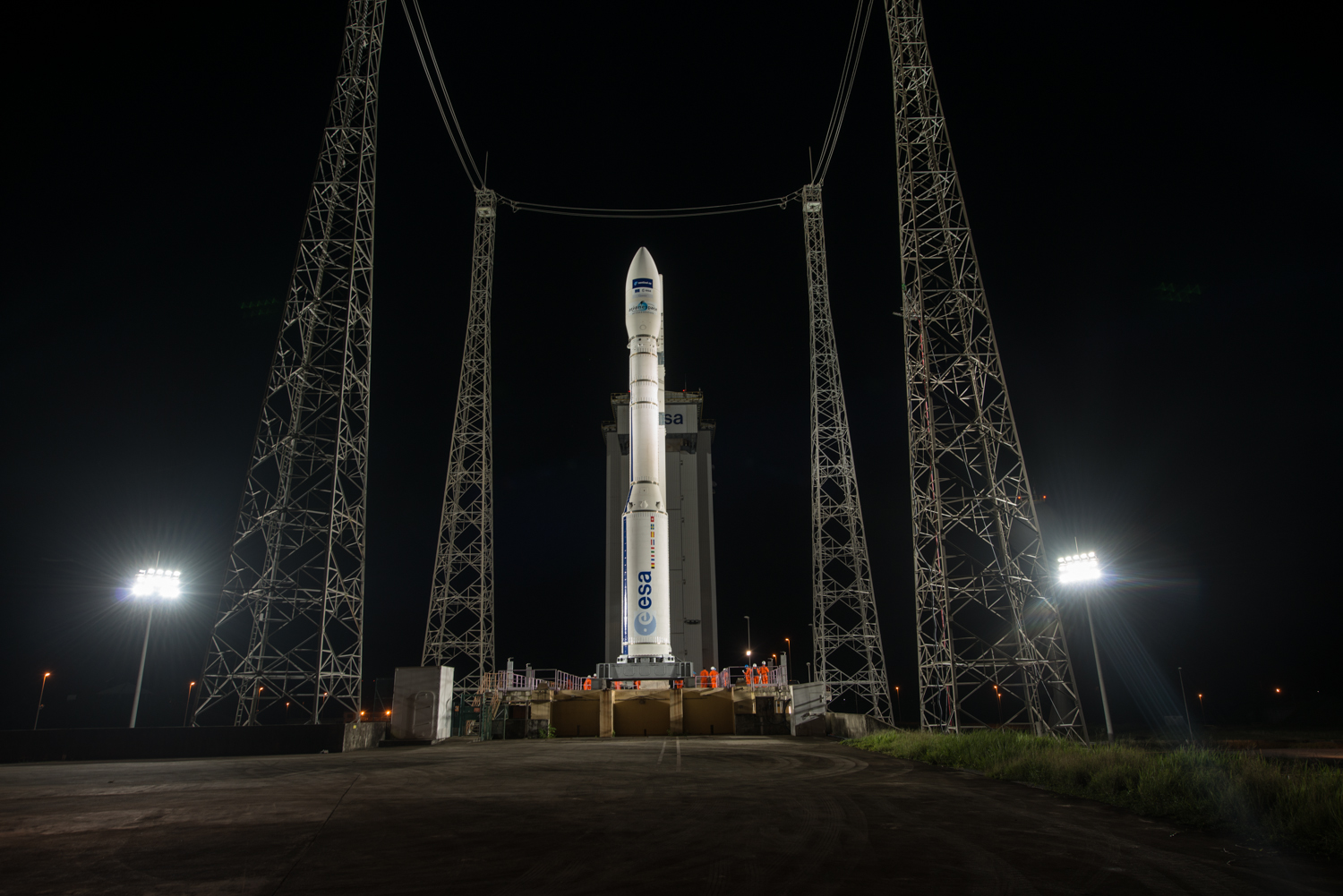
Vega with Sentinel-2 ready for launch

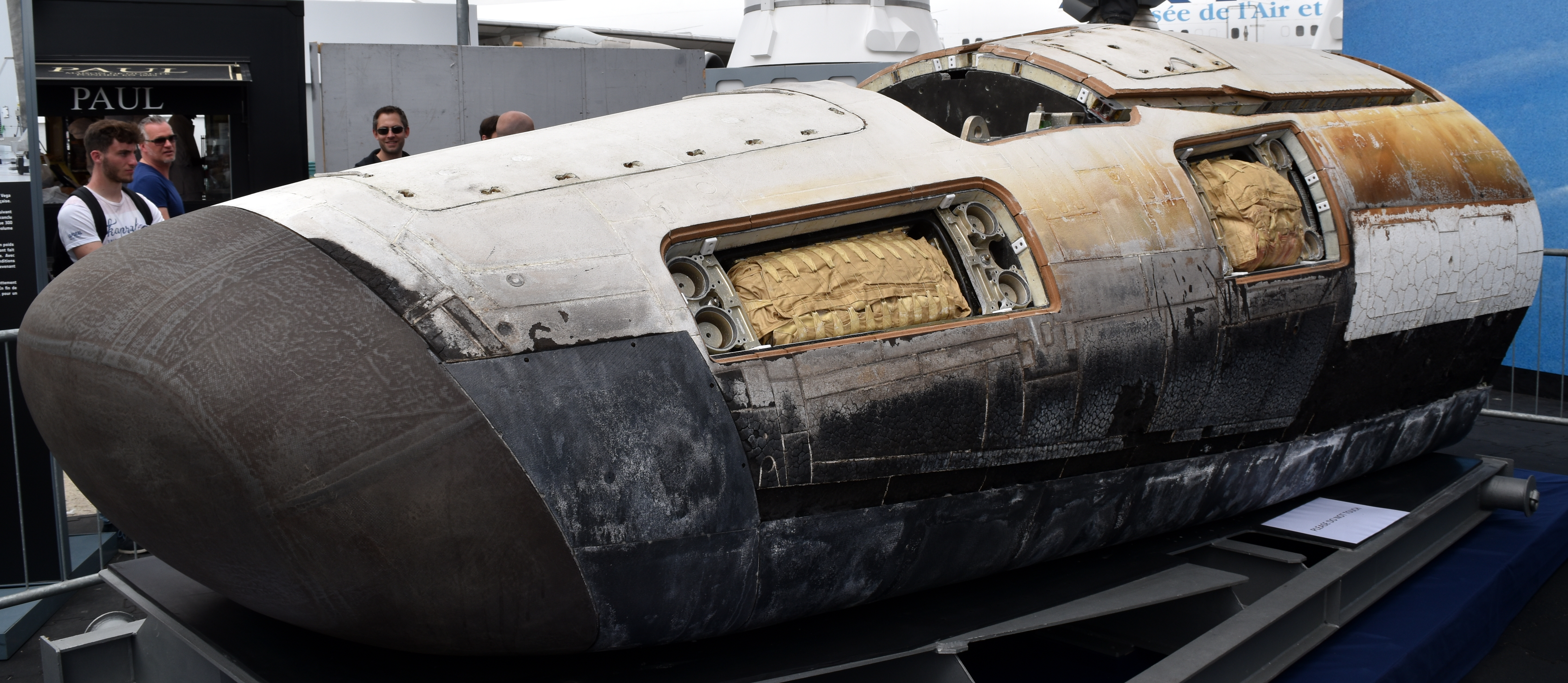
Intermediate eXperimental Vehicle

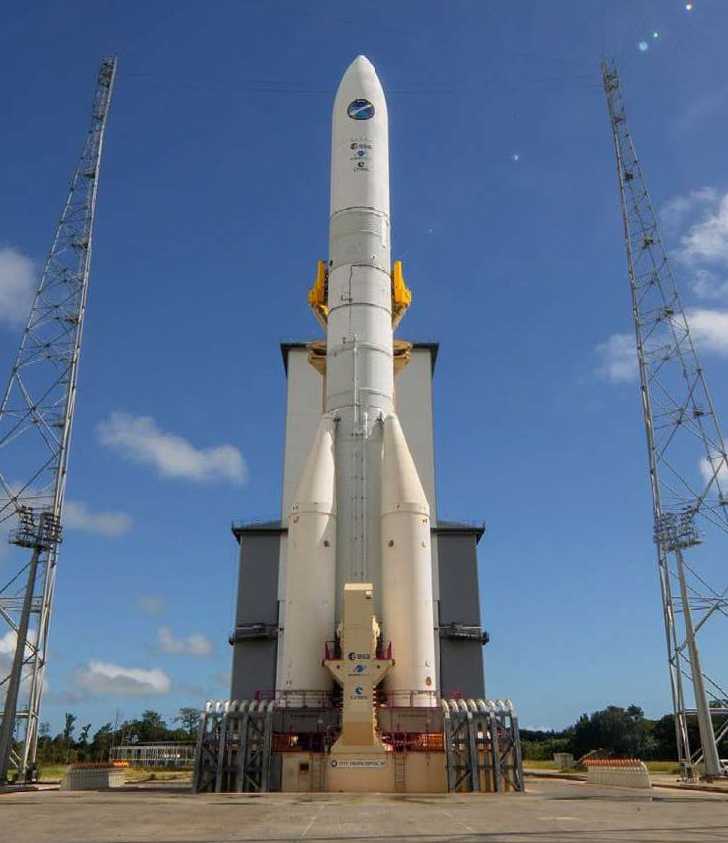
Ariane 6

- Ariane 1, Ariane 2, Ariane 3, Ariane 4, and Ariane 5, launched between 1979 and 2023, completed – past expendable launch systems of the Ariane rocket family developed for ESA
- Atmospheric Reentry Demonstrator (ARD), launched October 1998, completed – space capsule demonstration mission to test new technologies in atmospheric entry design
- Vega, launched between 2012 and 2024, completed – an expendable small-lift launch vehicle developed jointly by ESA and ISA
- Future Launchers Preparatory Programme (FLPP), since 2004, operational – ESA rocket development projects
  - Intermediate eXperimental Vehicle (IXV), launched February 2015, completed – experimental suborbital re-entry vehicle; demonstration mission for reusable launchers and spaceplanes
  - Vinci, first launch in 2024, operational – restartable, cryogenic, liquid-propellant rocket engine that powers the upper stage of Ariane 6
  - Space Rider, launching 2028 onward, future – an uncrewed lifting body orbital spaceplane, result of the Programme for Reusable In-orbit Demonstrator in Europe and a successor to IXV
  - Prometheus, future – methalox spacecraft propulsion system
  - Themis, future – ESA programme to develop a prototype reusable rocket first stage using the Prometheus rocket engine. A similar project called CALLISTO is being independently developed by CNES, DLR, and JAXA and DLR alone is developing the Reusable Flight Experiment (ReFEx), a demonstrator for a winged reusable rocket first stage.
- QARMAN, launched in 2019, failed – cubesat for testing reentry technologies
- Vega C, first launch in 2022, operational – a European expendable, small-lift launch vehicle, an evolution of the original Vega launcher, designed to offer greater launch performance and flexibility
- MicroHETsat, launched in 2023, operational – testing Hall Effect Thrusters on a microsatellite platform
- Ariane 6, first launch in 2024, operational – a European expendable launch system developed for ESA and manufactured by ArianeGroup. As part of the Ariane rocket family, it is operated by Arianespace, replacing the Ariane 5
- Boost! programme, since 2020, operational – support for European commercial initiatives that offer transportation services to space, in space, and returning from space. The supported projects include: Isar Aerospace's Spectrum launch vehicle, Orbex's Prime launch vehicle (canceled), Rocket Factory Augsburg's RFA One launch vehicle, PLD Space's Miura 5 launch vehicle, Skyrora's XL launch vehicle, HyImpulse's SL1 launch vehicle, Space Forge's ForgeStar reentry vehicle, SpaceForest's Perun suborbital sounding rocket, D-Orbit's ION satellite carrier, and the Omega service consortium's satellite propulsion systems
- Flight Ticket Initiative, since 2023, operational – joint ESA–EU programme supporting development of new satellite technologies with subsidized launch opportunities
- European Launcher Challenge, since 2023, operational – ESA-funded competition to support new launch vehicles with over 100 million euro for each selected vehicle
  - Spectrum, since 2025, operational – German commercial space launch vehicle
- FD1, launch in 2027, future – suborbital rocket demonstrator by Avio
- ASTRIS, future – an optional add-on stage for Ariane 6 using the BERTA engine developed under FLPP
- ASTRALIS, first flight planned for 2029, future — orbital transfer vehicle based on ASTRIS
- Reusable Upper Stage Demonstrator, future (proposed) – technology demonstration for reusable launch vehicles
- INVICTUS, first flight planned for 2032, future (proposed) – hypersonics and horizontal launch demonstrator based on the SABRE engine technology
- Ariane Next, future (proposed) – a partially reusable launcher planned to succeed Ariane 6
- EXPERT, cancelled – concept for a flying hypersonic re-entry vehicle with cooperation with Roscosmos. Indefinitely postponed since 2012, due to Roscosmos' withdrawal from the project

== Solar system exploration ==
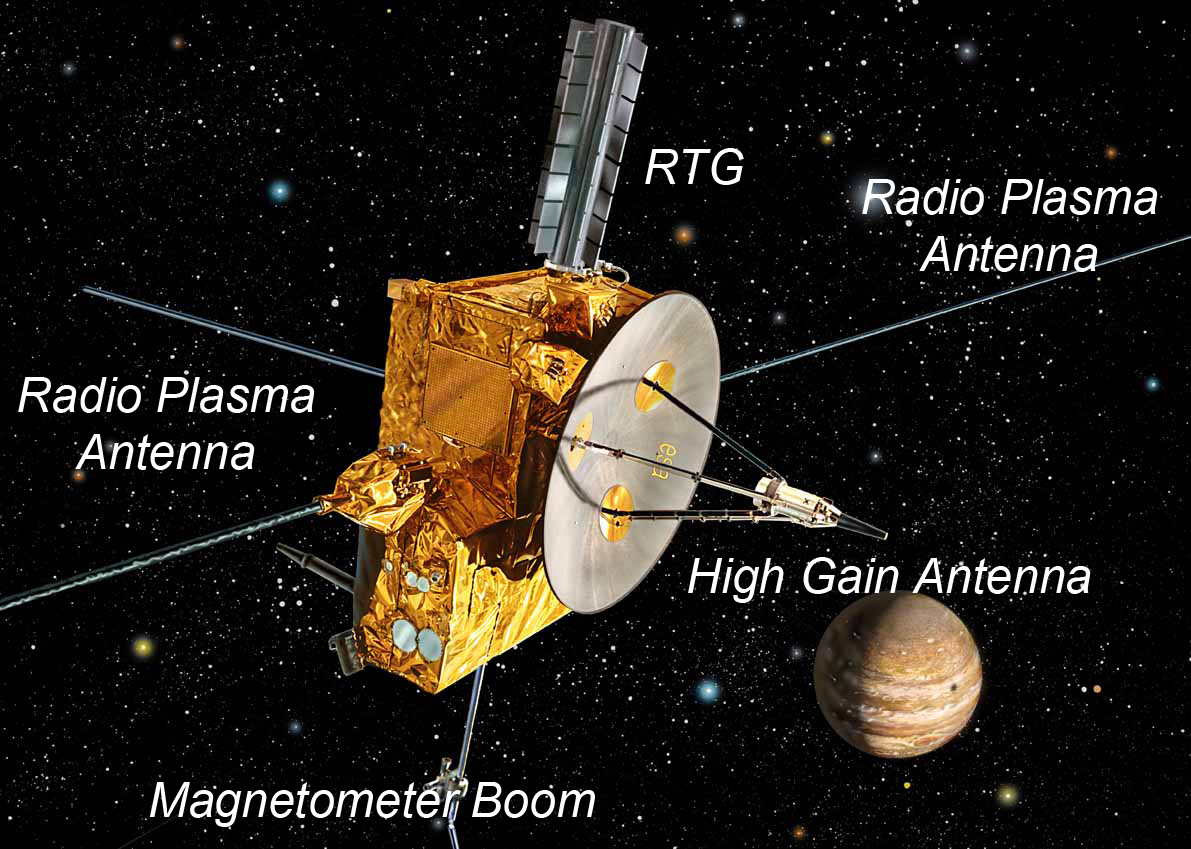
Artist's impression of Ulysses

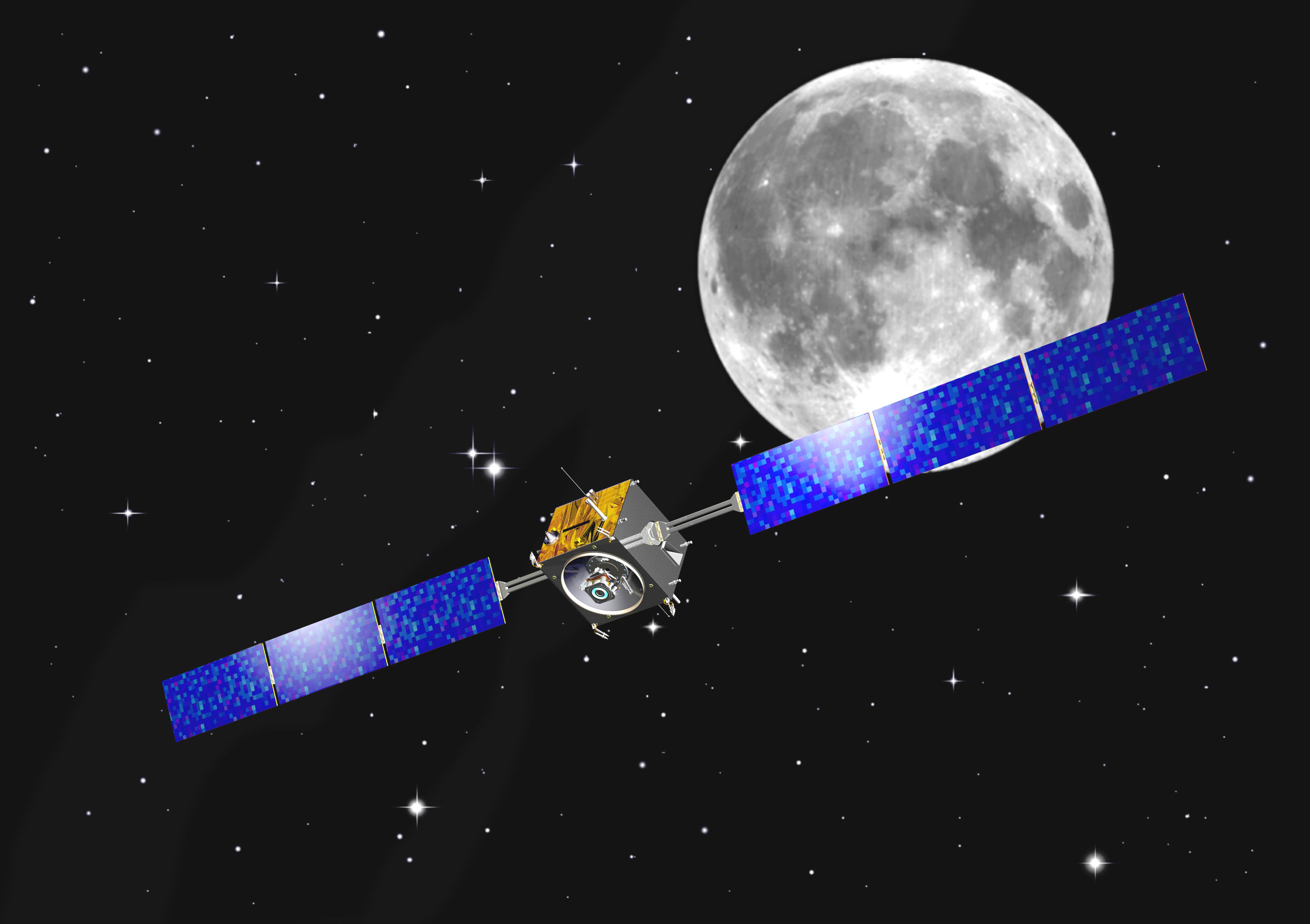
Artist's impression of SMART-1

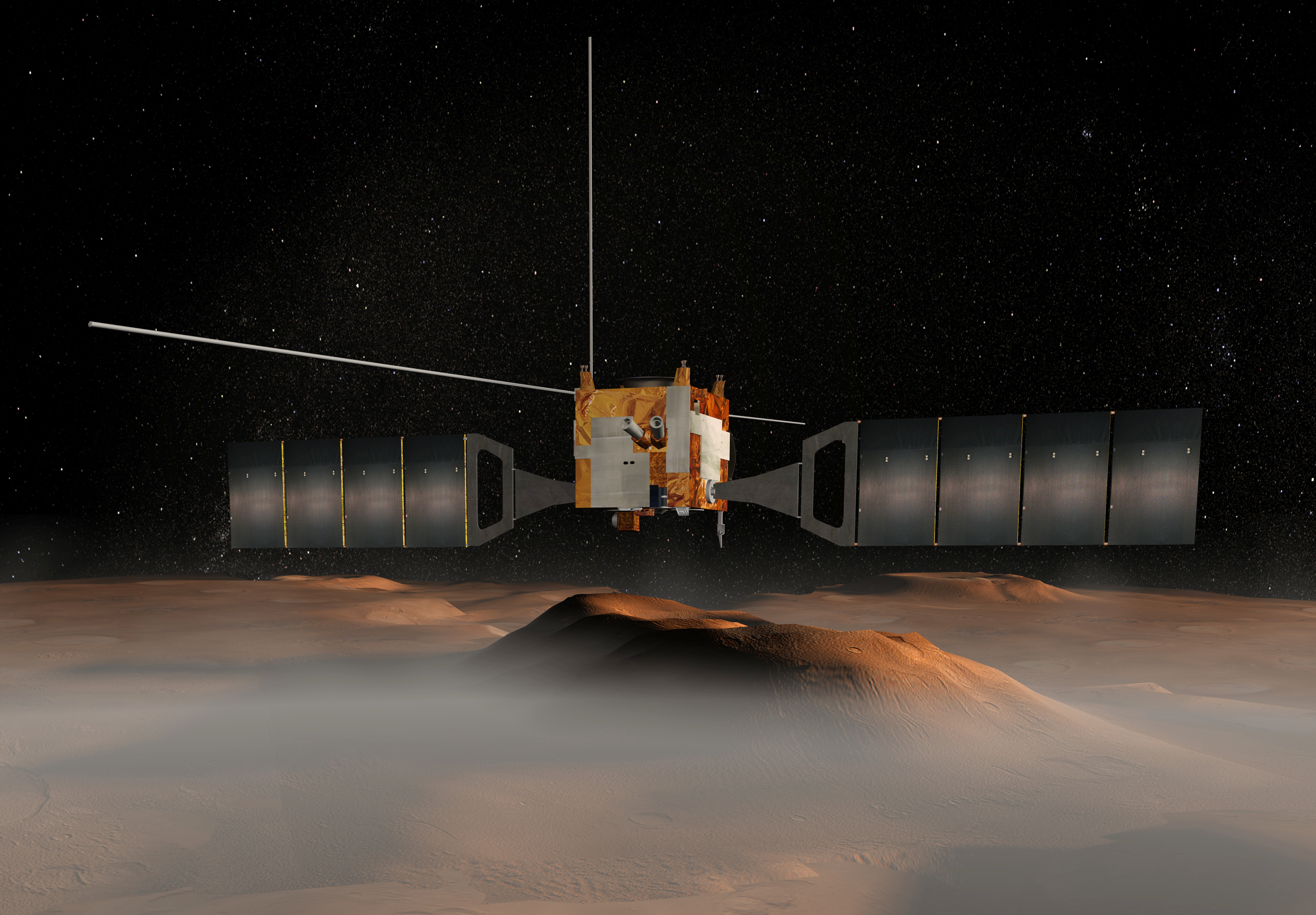
Artist's impression of Mars Express

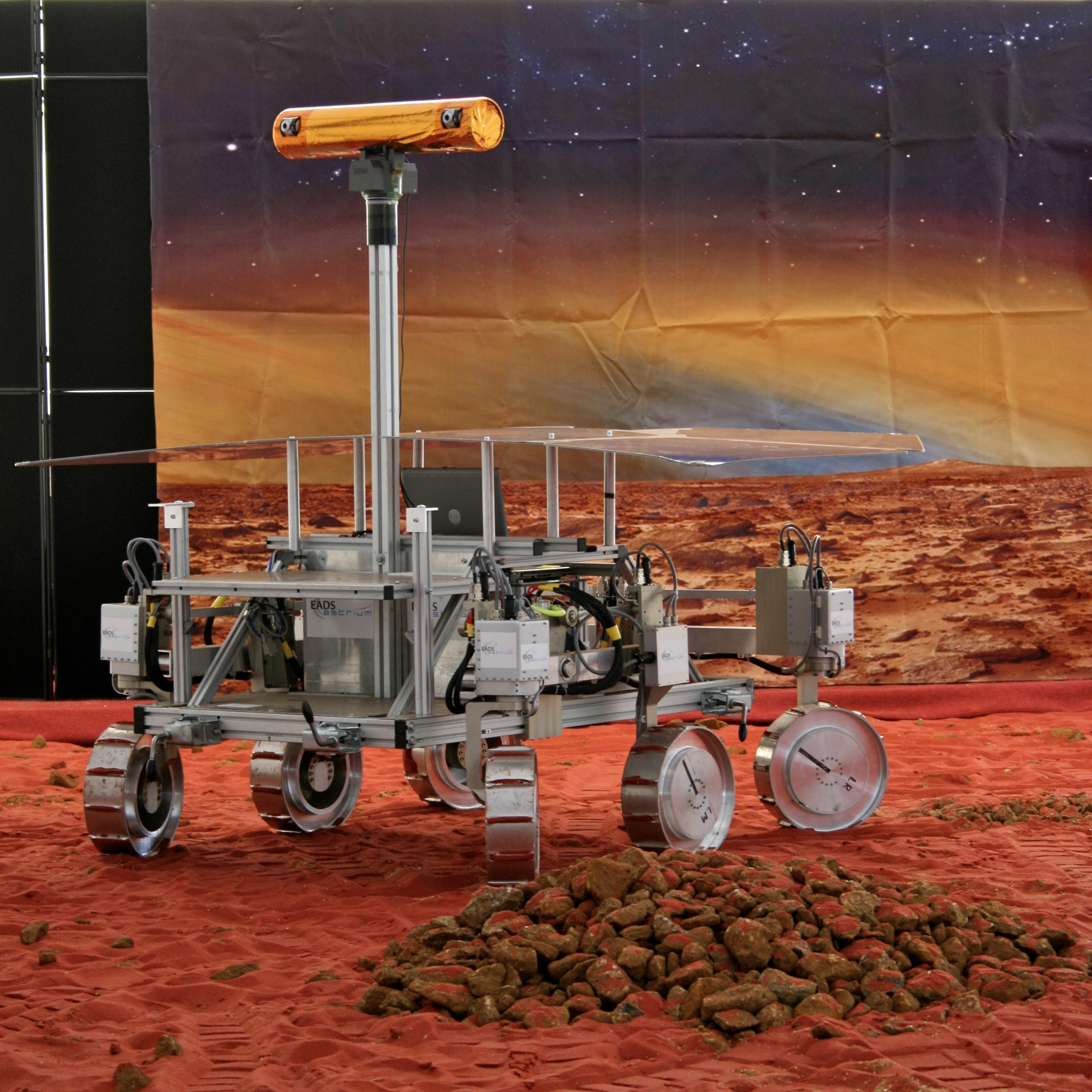
ExoMars prototype rover, 2009

Argonaut lunar lander

- ISEE-2, launched October 1977, completed – ESA component of the Joint NASA–ESA International Sun-Earth Explorer series of magnetospheric observations
- Giotto, launched July 1985, completed – first interplanetary mission by the ESA, aimed at performing the first comet flyby, of Comet Halley. Part of the canonical Halley Armada
- Ulysses, launched October 1990, completed – joint ESA–NASA Solar observatory mission, employing a spacecraft in a polar heliocentric orbit
- SMART-1, launched September 2003, completed – demonstration mission for solar electric propulsion, manifesting in a lunar orbiter mission carrying low-cost, miniaturised instruments
- Mars Express, launched June 2003, operational – Mars orbiter mission focused on observing the planet through high-resolution imagery and conducting research of the planet's interaction with the solar system
- Venus Express, launched November 2005, completed – Venus orbiter mission, focused on long-term study and observation of its atmosphere from polar cytherocentric orbit
- Schiaparelli, launched March 2016, failed – demonstration mission for landing technologies designed for the ExoMars surface platform. Failed upon landing on Mars
- Trace Gas Orbiter (TGO), launched March 2016, operational – Mars orbiter component of the ExoMars astrobiology mission, focused on observing methane in the planet's atmosphere for clues to past or present life on Mars
- HENON, launch planned for 2027, future – a space weather mission, ESA's first ever stand-alone deep space cubesat
- Lunar Pathfinder, launch planned for 2027, future – a lunar communication satellite, precursor to the Moonlight Initiative
- M-Argo, launch planned for 2027, future – a cubesat mission to an asteroid
- LUMIO, launch planned for 2028, future – a cubesat mission to characterize the impacts of near-Earth meteoroids on the lunar far side
- Moonlight, launching 2028 onward, future – a constellation of communication and navigation satellites around the Moon. Part of the NASA–ESA–JAXA project LunaNet
- Rosalind Franklin, launching 2028, future – an ExoMars program Mars landing mission. Planned to be the first European Mars rover
- VMMO, launch planned for 2028, future (proposed) – cubesat mission to map the distribution of water ice and ilmenite in the Moon's shadowed polar regions
- Moonraker, launch planned for 2028, future (proposed) – LiDAR mapping mission in a polar orbit around the Moon
- MAGPIE, launch planned for 2029, future – the first lunar rover mission by ESA; developed by ispace
- Máni, launch planned for 2029, future – Danish-led small Lunar satellite for high-resolution mapping of the Moon's surface
- Argonaut, first launch planned for 2030, future – a class of large lunar landers for lunar logistics
- NovaMoon, launch on Argonaut 2 planned for 2030s, future – lunar surface instruments enhancing the accuracy of Moonlight
- MoonRAD, future (proposed) – lunar orbiter monitoring the cislunar radiation environment
- ASSIGN (Advancing Solar System Internet and GrouNd) programme, future (proposed) – interplanetary communication network of networks building upon the Moonlight initiative
  - SSI Node-1, future (proposed) – central element of ASSIGN; demonstration of an optical trunk link from Moon's orbit
- LightShip, first launch planned for 2032, future (proposed) – a propulsive tug for interplanetary transfer to Mars
- SpotLight, launch planned for 2032, future (proposed) – high resolution imagery Mars orbiter. The first spacecraft to be delivered to Mars by LightShip, part of the LightShip-1 mission
- 2035 Mars lander, launch planned for 2035, future (proposed) – a larger follow-up to Rosalind Franklin with high-precision landing on Mars. The first mission using results of the Mars Entry, Descent, and Landing (MEDaL) programme
- Lunar Link, future (proposed) – lunar communications equipment
- Flapping Wing Mars Explorer, future (proposed) – in-situ measurements near Mars surface using a hummingbird-inspired biomimetic aerial platform
- ODINUS, future (proposed) – a dual Uranus and Neptune orbital mission. Proposed for the L2 and L3 missions of the Cosmic Vision programme, but eliminated from the running both times
- Marco Polo, future (proposed) – a sample-return mission focused on collecting and returning a sample from a Near-Earth object. Proposed for the M1, M2, M3, M4 and M5 missions of the Cosmic Vision programme, it has since been rejected all five times
- ESA contribution to Mars Sample Return, cancelled:
  - Earth Return Orbiter (ERO), reuse of certain components possible
  - Sample Transfer Arm, possibly reassigned to a new role on the Moon
- Don Quijote, cancelled – concept for a demonstration mission, testing technologies in asteroid deflection. Abandoned after lack of interest from the ESA
- Lunar Lander, cancelled – proposed launch in 2018 – Demonstration mission aimed at testing new technologies in lunar landing, including autonomous redirects. Project put on hold due to lack of financial support, as of 2012. Superseded by Argonaut
- HERACLES, cancelled – planned robotic lunar landing system by ESA and JAXA. Superseded by Argonaut

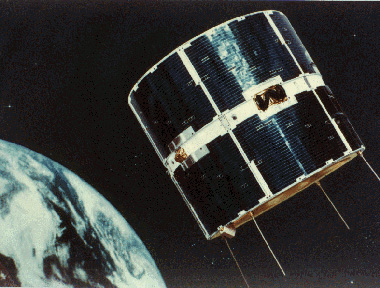
Artwork depicting COS-B, the first ESA-operated science mission, launched in August 1975.

== Astronomy and astrophysics ==
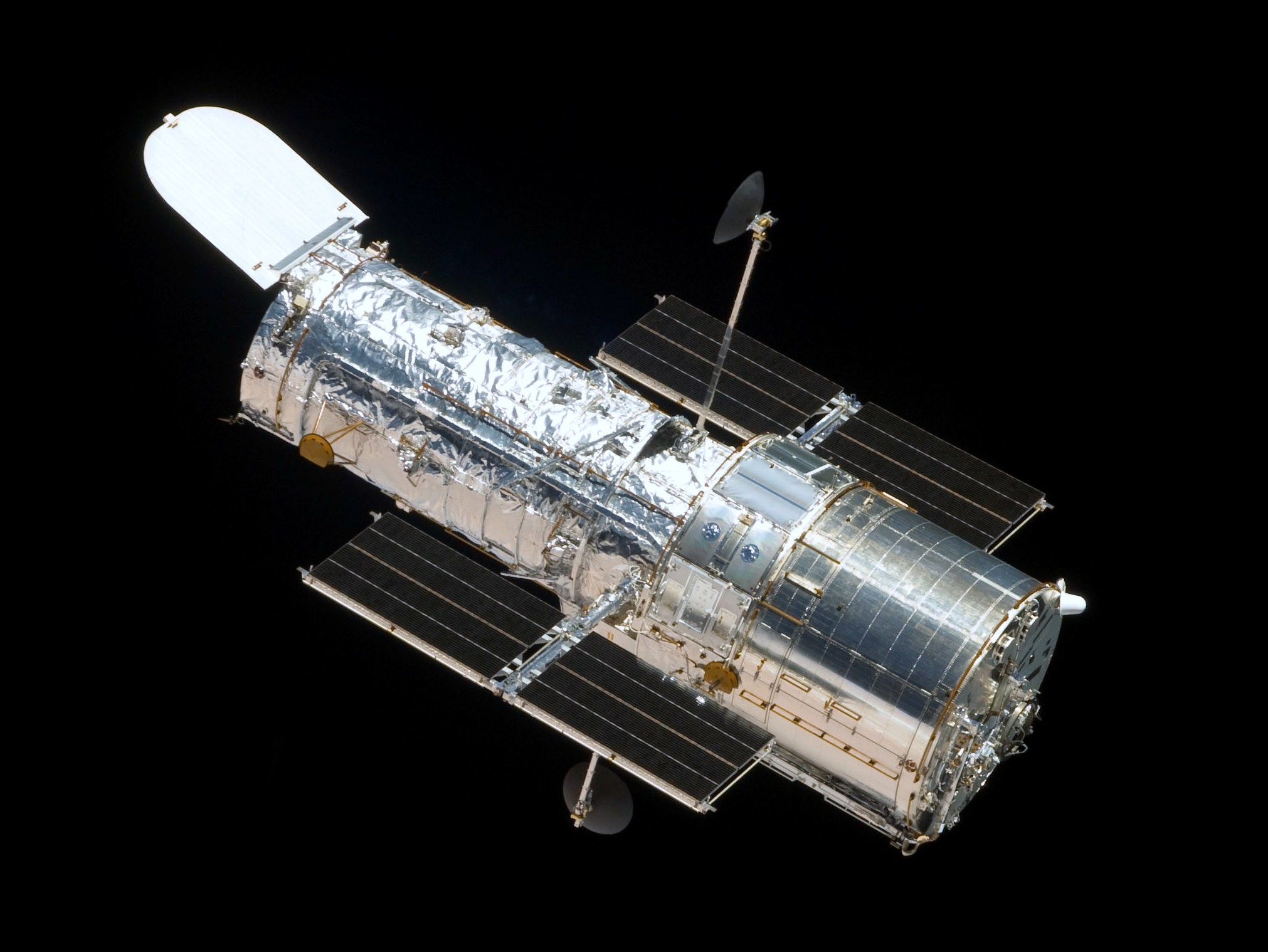
Hubble Space Telescope

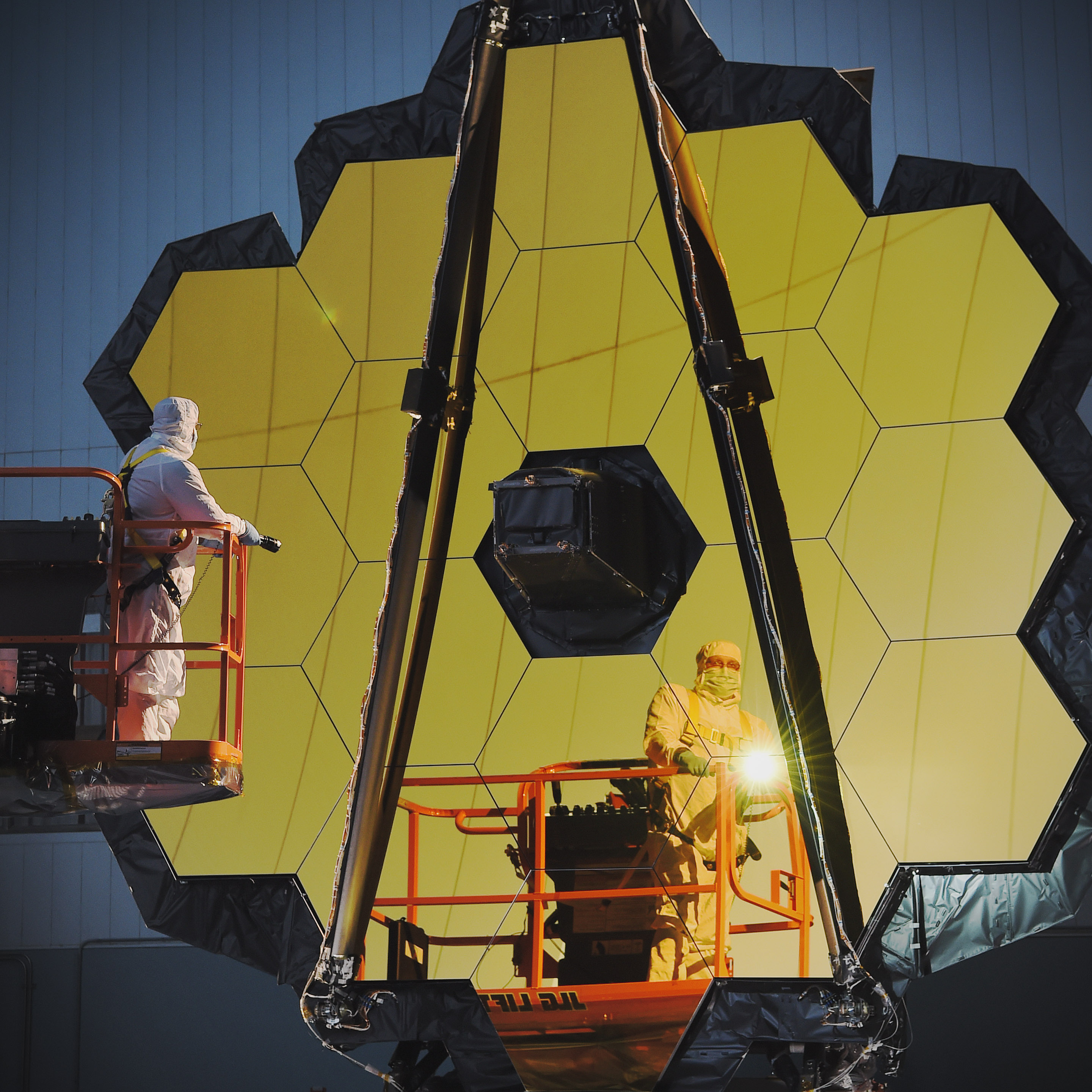
Primary mirror of the James Webb Space Telescope undergoing evaluation.

- COS-B, launched August 1975, completed – gamma-ray space observatory mission organized by the European Space Research Organisation, a precursor to the ESA. The first mission launched by ESA
- International Ultraviolet Explorer (IUE), launched January 1978, completed – joint NASA–ESA–SERC ultraviolet space observatory mission for general astronomy
- EXOSAT, launched May 1983, completed – ESA's first X-ray space observatory mission
- Hipparcos, launched August 1989, completed – first astrometry mission ever launched, focused on cataloguing over 118,200 stars in the eponymous Hipparcos Catalogue, published in 1997
- Infrared Space Observatory (ISO), launched November 1995, completed – infrared space observatory mission for general astronomy
- Hubble Space Telescope (HST), launched April 1990, operational – joint NASA–ESA–STScl space observatory mission, carried out by a near ultraviolet, visible, and near infrared telescope
- CoRoT, launched December 2006, completed – CNES-led space telescope mission to search for rocky exoplanets and perform asteroseismology studies
- Sunstorm, launched in 2021, completed – solar X-ray spectrometer cubesat
- James Webb Space Telescope (JWST), launched in December 2021, operational – joint NASA–ESA–CSA infrared space observatory mission for general astronomy and cosmology
- PROBA-3, launched December 2024, operational – microsatellite solar observation and formation flying demonstration mission, serving as the fourth flight in the Proba series
- CubeSpec, launching in 2027, future – asteroseismology cubesat
- QUVIK, launching in 2028, future – Czech UV telescope
- Astrophysical Lunar Observatory, launch planned for around 2035, future (proposed) – radio telescopes on the far side of the Moon, delivered by Argonaut.
- LOFT, future (proposed) – X-ray space observatory mission focused on the study of high-mass objects such as black holes and neutron stars. Finalist for the M3 slot in the Cosmic Vision programme, but lost to PLATO
- STE-QUEST, future (proposed) – astrophysics demonstration mission focused on testing the equivalence principle
- THESEUS, future (proposed) – astrophysics mission to study gamma-ray bursts and X-rays for investigating the early universe; unsuccessful finalist for Cosmic Vision M5, candidate for M7.
- Darwin, cancelled – proposed exoplanetary science mission focused on directly detecting Earth-like exoplanets. Proposed as a cornerstone for the Horizon 2000+ programme, but abandoned in 2007
- EChO, cancelled – space observatory mission aimed at exoplanetary science, employing high resolution, multi-wavelength spectroscopic observations. Finalist for the M3 slot in the Cosmic Vision programme, but lost to PLATO. Succeeded by ARIEL as the M4 mission
- Eddington, cancelled – concept for an asteroseismology mission designed to detect exoplanets. Cancelled in 2003

== Meteorology and Earth observation ==
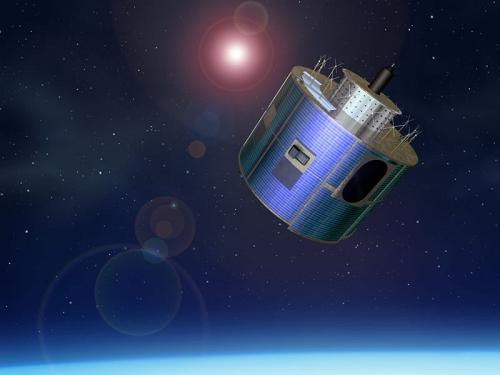
Artist's impression of Meteosat Second Generation

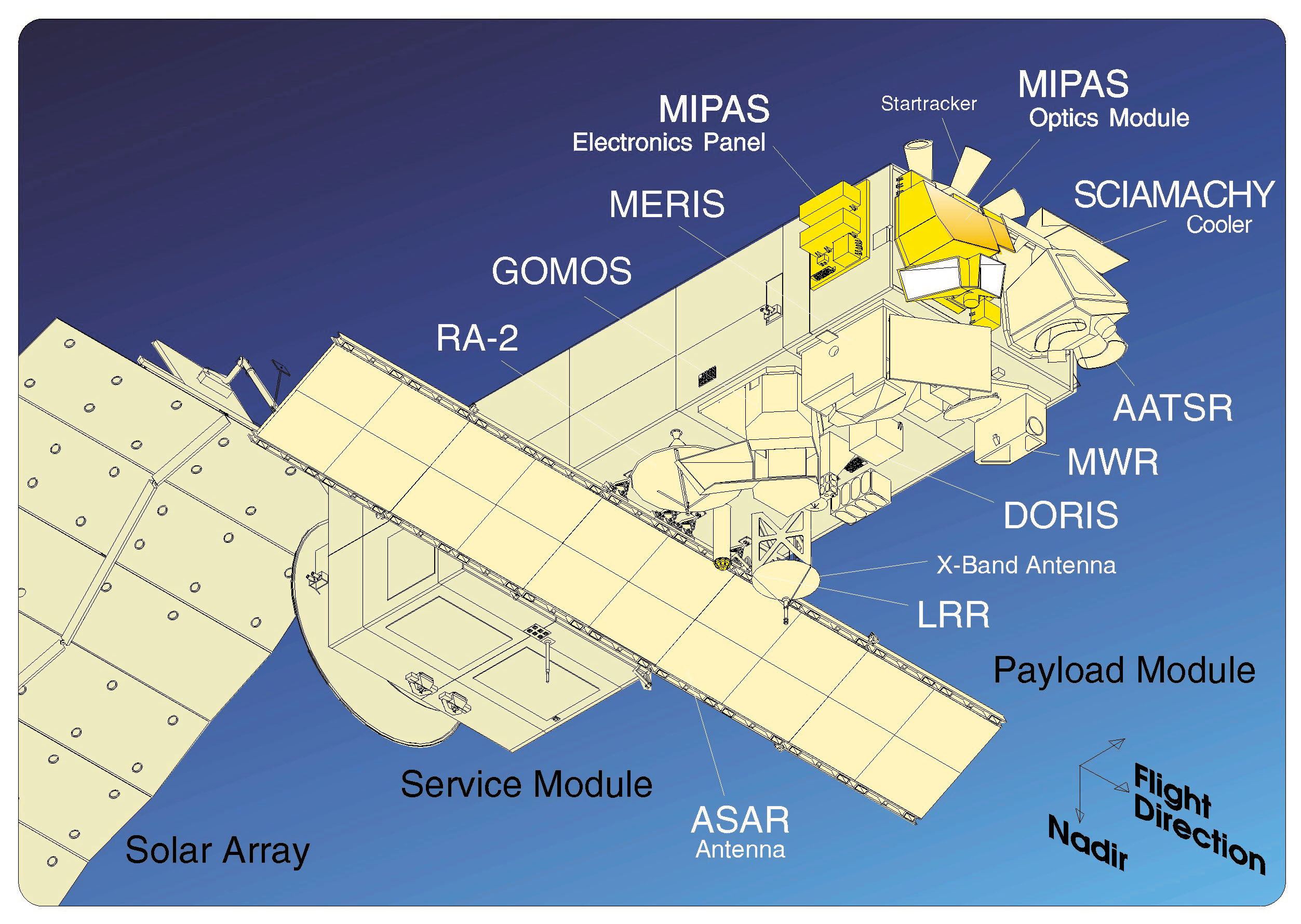
Instruments carried by Envisat.

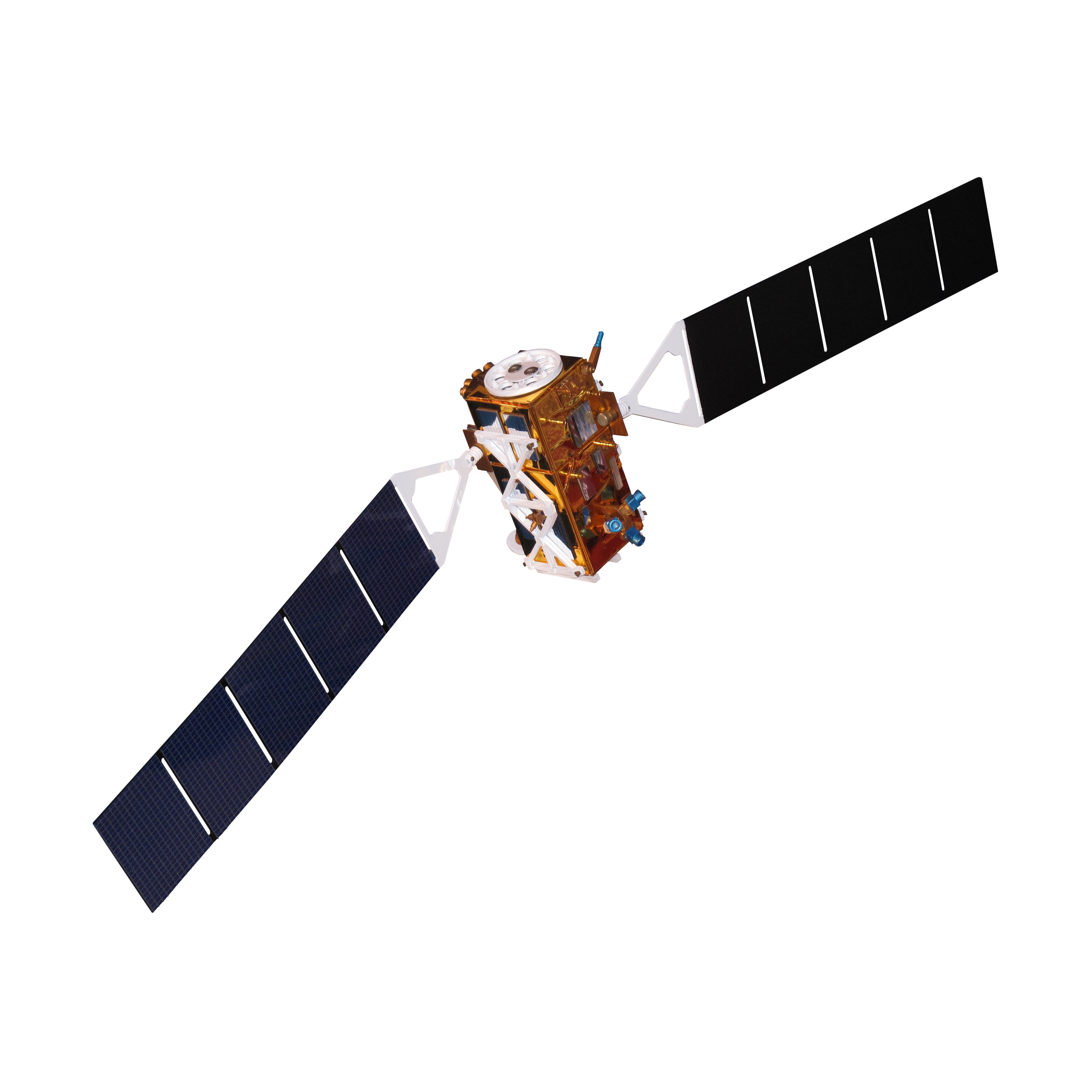
Model of Sentinel 1

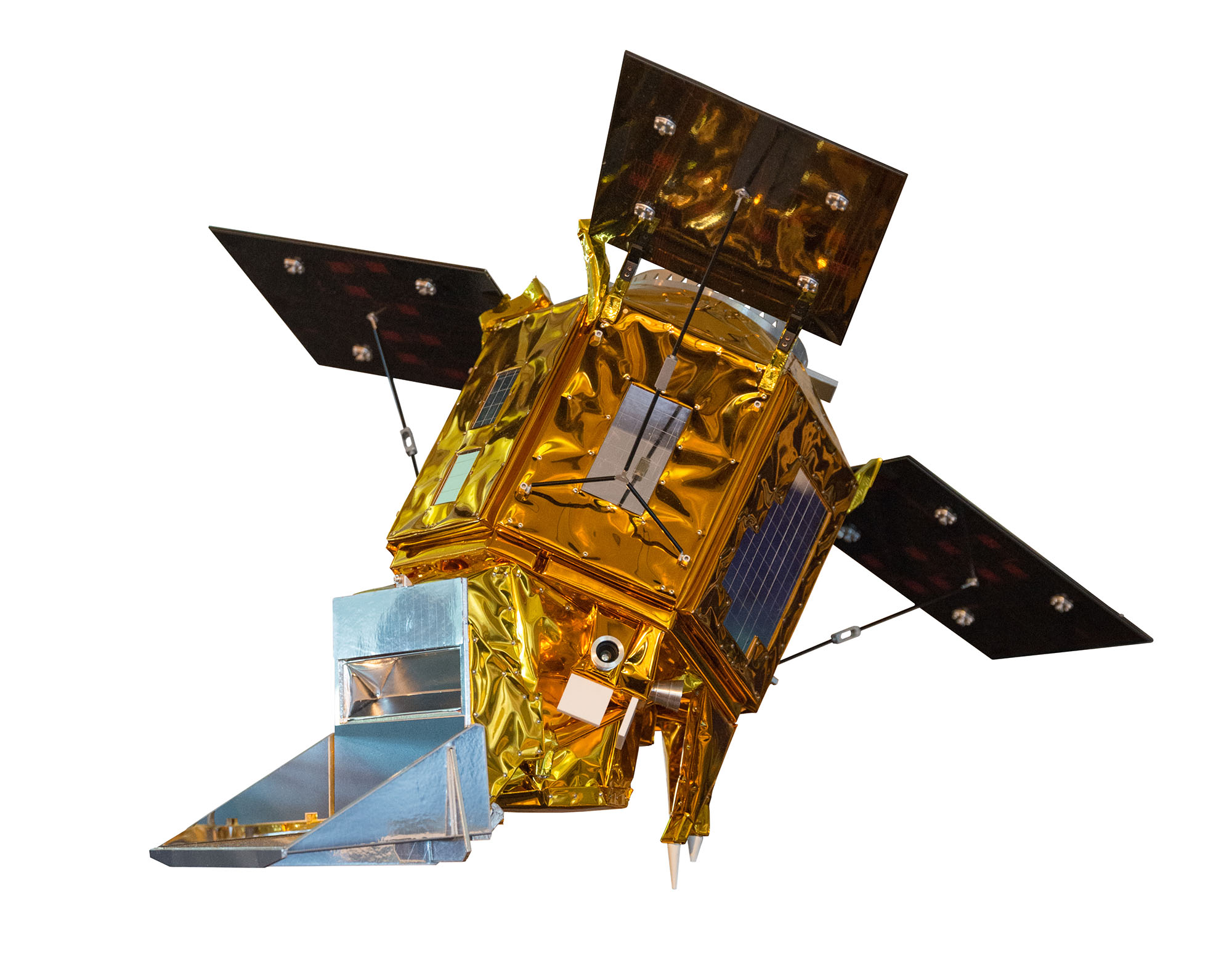
Sentinel 5P model

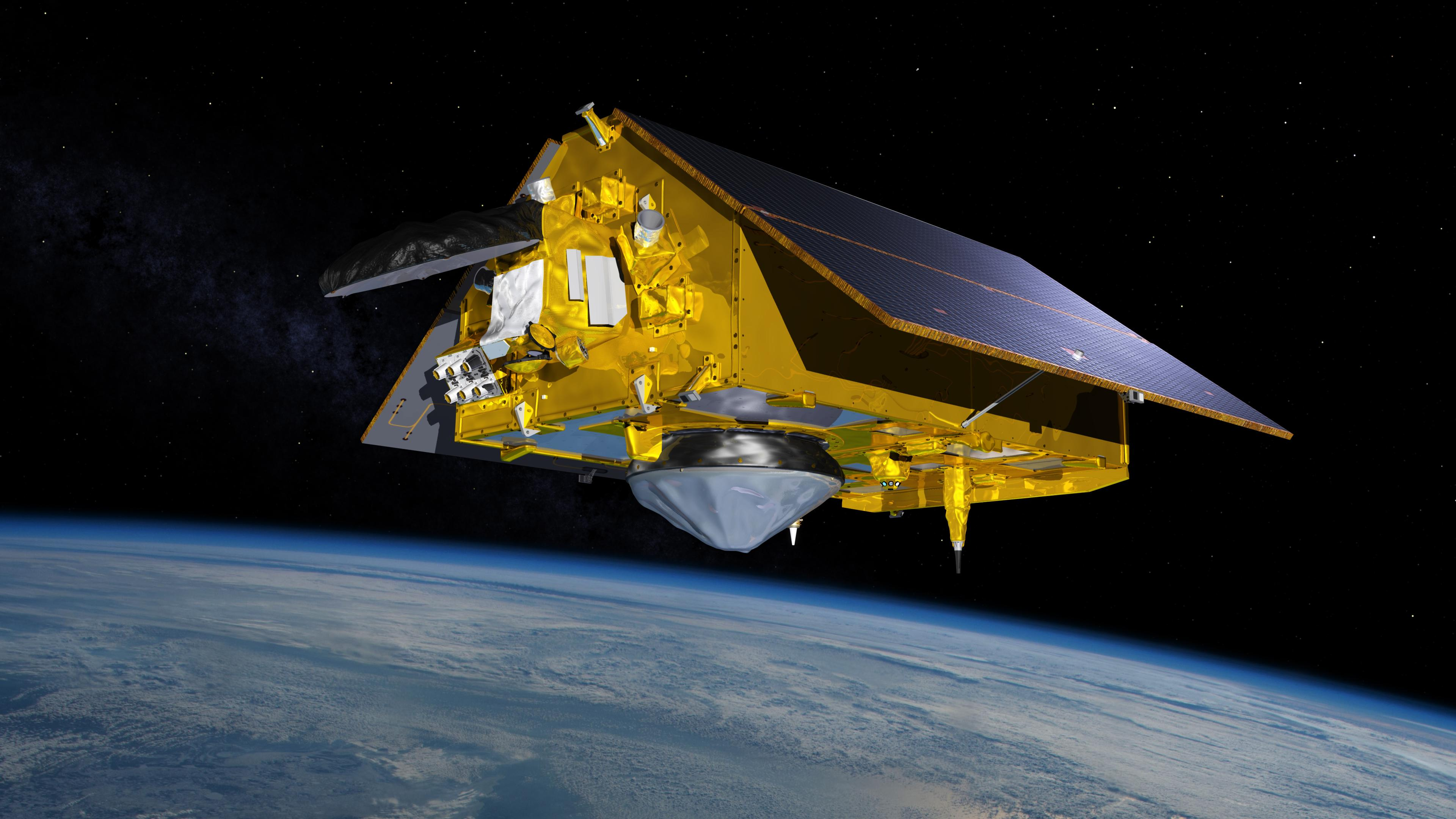
Sentinel-6 Michael Freilich

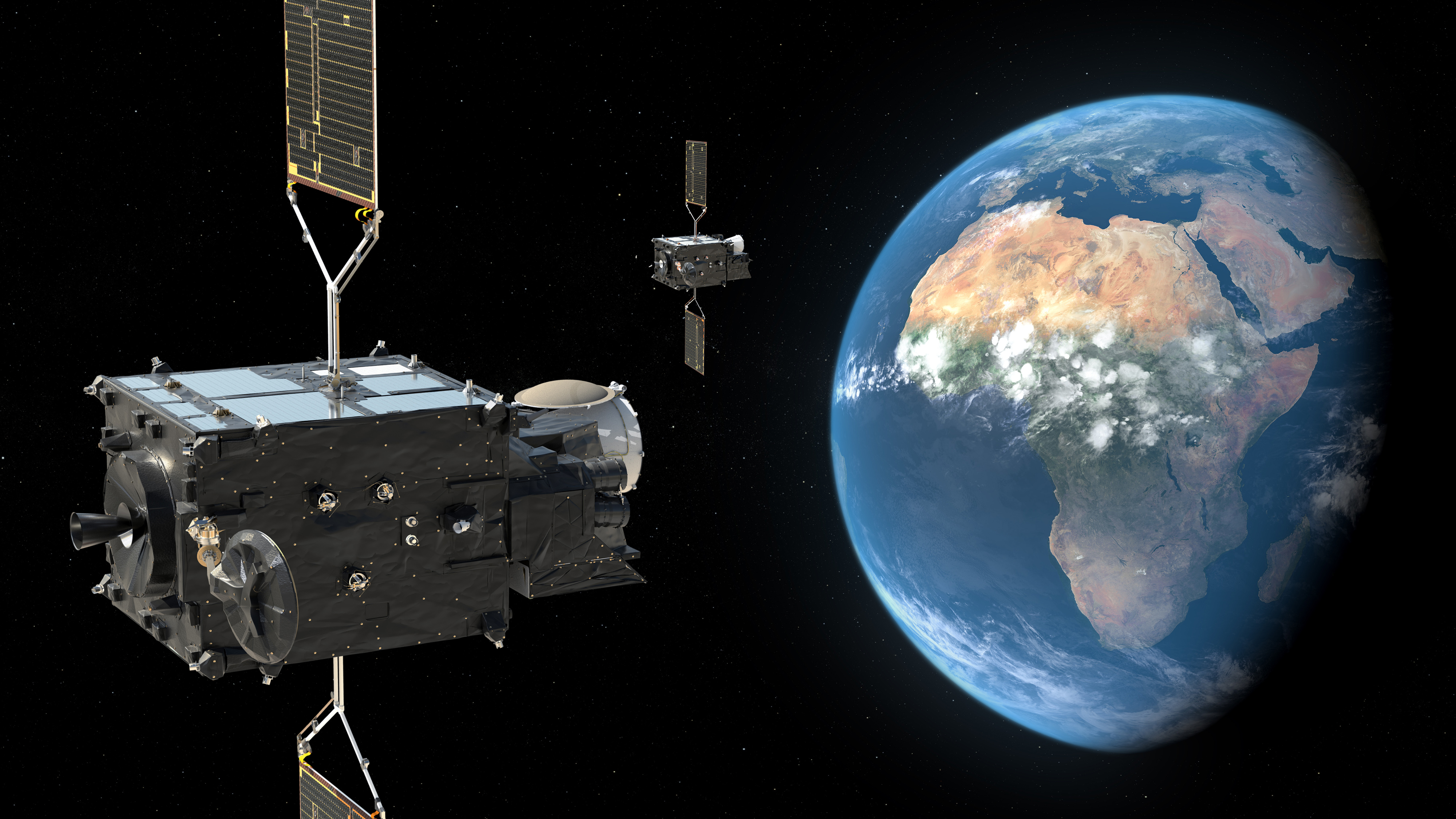
Artist's rendering of Meteosat Third Generation

- Meteosat (first generation), launched November 1977 to September 1997, completed – joint EUMETSAT–ESA meteorology mission consisting seven geostationary satellites launched over a period of twenty years. Meteosat-7 re-orbiting commenced on 3-April-2017
- GEOS-1 and GEOS-2, launched April 1977 and July 1978, completed – magnetospheric reconnaissance mission, consisting experimental payloads by various European national space administrations
- ERS-1 and ERS-2, launched July 1991 and April 1995, completed – ESA's first Earth observation missions
- PROBA-1, launched October 2001, operational – microsatellite earth observation and Low Earth Orbit technology demonstration mission for various new instruments, the first mission of the PROBA satellite series
- Envisat, launched March 2002, completed – Earth observation mission focused on environmental studies, using the largest civilian Earth observation satellite ever launched
- Double Star, launched December 2003 and July 2004, completed – joint CNSA–ESA Earth observation mission to study the planet's magnetosphere, complementing the Horizon 2000 Cluster mission
- Meteosat Second Generation (MSG), launched January 2004 to July 2015, operational – joint EUMETSAT–ESA meteorology mission to launch the second generation of Meteosat satellites, of which four were launched over a period of eleven years
- CryoSat-1, launched October 2005, failed – environmental science and glaciology mission, focused on studying Earth's polar ice caps. Failed on launch, and relaunched as CryoSat-2 in the Living Planet Programme
- MetOp (first generation), launched October 2006 to 2018, operational – joint EUMETSAT-ESA operational meteorology mission consisting three satellites launched over a period of twelve years
- PROBA-2, launched November 2009, operational – microsatellite earth observation and Low Earth Orbit technology demonstration mission, serving as the second flight in the Proba series
- PROBA-V, launched May 2013, operational – microsatellite earth observation mission focused on mapping land cover and vegetation growth across Earth in bi-daily cycles; the 3rd mission in the Proba series
- Sentinel, launched April 2014 onward, operational – suite of Earth observation missions serving as the ESA's contribution to the European Commission's Copernicus Programme
  - Sentinel-1, first launch in 2014, operational – all-weather, day and night radar imaging
  - Sentinel-2, first launch in 2015, operational – high-resolution optical imaging
  - Sentinel-3, first launch in 2016, operational – ocean and global land monitoring services
  - Sentinel-5 Precursor, launched in 2017, operational – monitoring air pollution
  - Sentinel-6, first launch in 2020, operational – sea level altimetry
  - Sentinel-4, first launch in 2025, operational – Europe's 1st hyperspectral sounding mission in GEO
  - Sentinel-5A, launched in 2025, operational – atmospheric composition monitoring
  - CO2M (Sentinel-7), first launch in 2027, future – anthropogenic CO_{2} emissions monitoring
- TechDemoSat-1, launched in 2014, completed – joint UKSA–ESA GNSS reflectometry demonstration mission
- SIMBA, launched in 2020, completed – cubesat mission measuring total solar irradiance to determine Earth’s radiation budget.
- PICASSO, launched in 2020, completed – cubesat mission measuring the ozone distribution in the stratosphere, the temperature profile up to the mesosphere, and the electron density in the ionosphere.
- RadCube, launched in 2021, completed – cubesat mission monitoring space weather impacts to Earth's magnetosphere during a peak in solar activity cycle.
- Meteosat Third Generation (MTG), launched December 2022 onward, operational – joint EUMETSAT-ESA meteorology mission to launch the third generation of Meteosat satellites
- OPS-SAT PRETTY, launched in October 2023, operational – cubesat using Galileo and GPS signals to measure sea ice
- PROBA-V CubeSat Companion, launched in October 2023, operational – cubesat using a spare Earth observation instrument from the PROBA-V mission
- MANTIS, launched in November 2023, completed – multispectral imaging cubesat
- Intuition-1, launched in November 2023, operational – Polish technology demonstration cubesat for Earth observation, supported by ESA
- Arctic Weather Satellite, launched in August 2024, operational – joint ESA–EUMETSAT small meteorological satellite providing detailed temperature and humidity profiles. A precursor to the proposed EPS-Sterna constellation
- AIX, first launch in January 2025, operational – series of technology demonstration satellites
- HiVE, first launch in January 2025, operational – thermal imaging constellation
- FOREST-3, launched in 2025, operational – thermal imaging satellite for wildfire detection
- IRIDE, first launch in 2025, operational – joint ESA–ASI Earth observation satellite constellation providing environmental, emergency, and security services for Italy
- DUTHSat-2, launched in June 2025, operational – joint ESA–Greek environmental monitoring 6U cubesat
- MetOp-SG, first launch in 2025, operational – joint EUMETSAT–ESA operational meteorology mission, launching the second generation of MetOp satellites, of which a constellation of six will be launched
- VIREON, first launch in 2026, operational – Earth observation constellation by AAC Clyde Space, focused on agriculture
- Atlantic Constellation, first launch in 2026, future – constellation of Earth observation satellites for Spain, Portugal, and UK
- ALTIUS, launching in 2026, future – monitoring the distribution and evolution of stratospheric ozone in the Earth's atmosphere
- VULCAIN, launching in 2027, future – thermal and visible light imaging of volcanoes by two identical cubesats
- TALISMAN, launching 2027, future – methane emissions-detecting cubesat
- CAMILA, launching 2027 onward, future – joint POLSA–ESA Earth observation satellite constellation
- Genesis, launching in 2028, future – geodetic satellite that will update the International Terrestrial Reference Frame (ITRF) of Earth with an accuracy of 1 mm
- Arctic Ocean Surveillance, launching 2028 onward, future – maritime monitoring satellites for Norway
- EPS-Sterna, launching 2029 onward, future – joint ESA–EUMETSAT constellation of 18 micro-satellites, based on the Arctic Weather Satellite
- AMBIC, launching in 2030, future – Czech Earth observation satellite
- Next Generation Gravity Mission (NGGM), launch planned for 2032, future (proposed) – a pair of identical gravimetry satellites
- European Resilience from Space (ERS), future – intelligence and surveillance programme
- Aeolus-2, launching in 2034, future – operational Aeolus follow-on mission
- EARS, future – constellation of GNSS Radio Occultation satellites for atmospheric science
- TRUTHS, cancelled – satellite for continuous measurements of incoming and reflected radiation to evaluate Earth's energy-in to energy-out ratio, providing reference for climate measurements. Suspended at the end of 2025 after the UK Space Agency withdrew its funding for the project.

== Communication and navigation ==
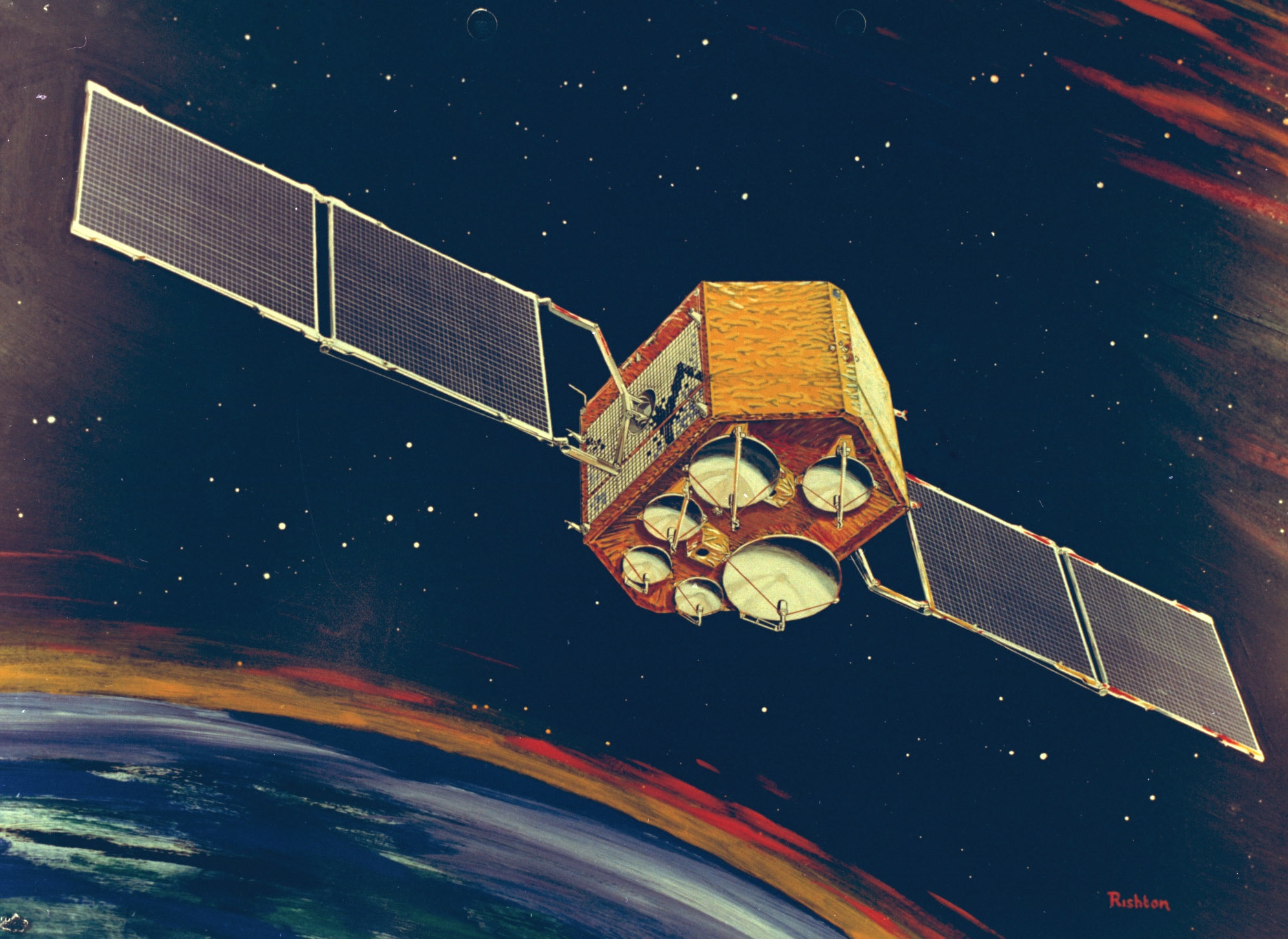
Artist's impression of Orbital Test Satellite-2

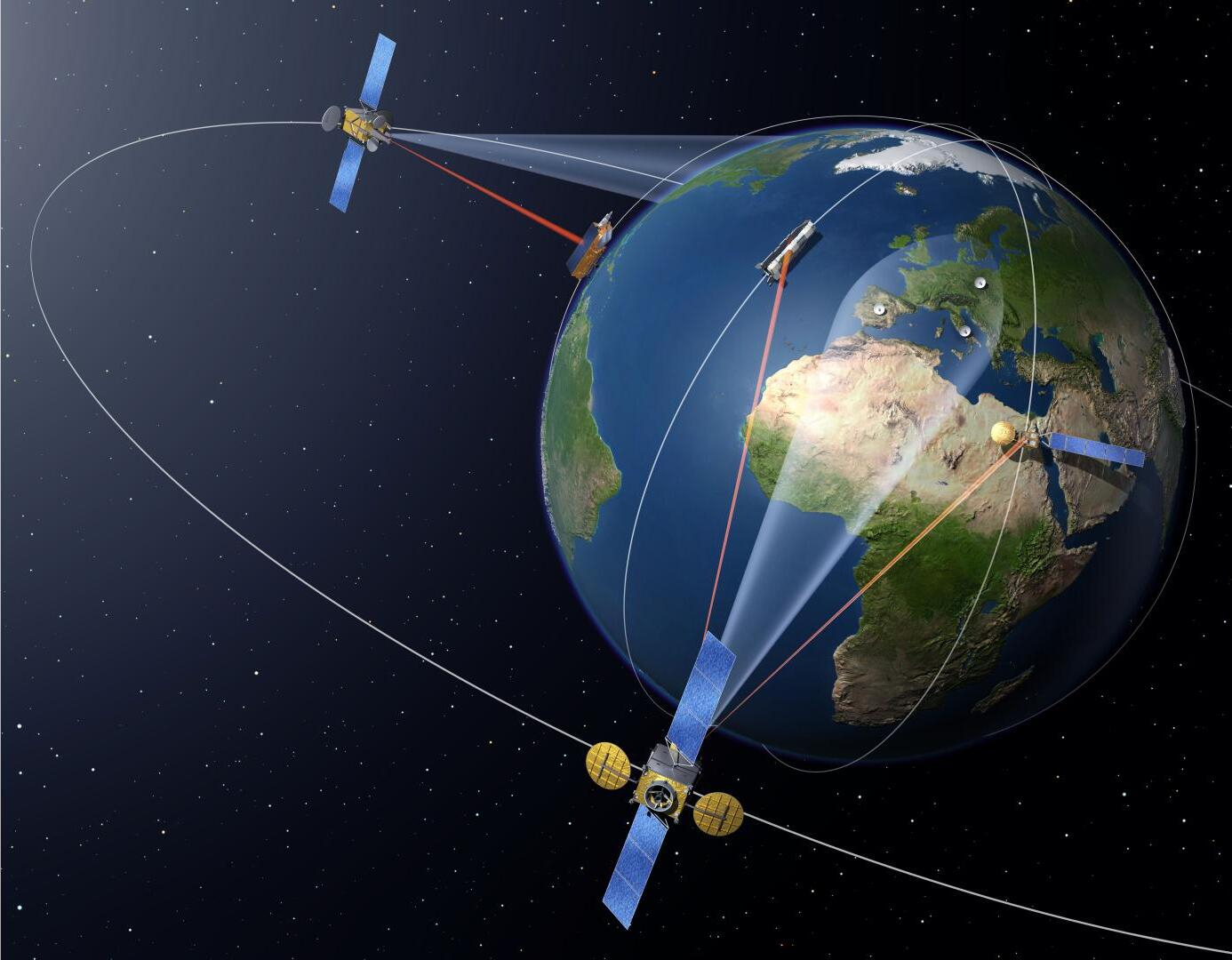
Illustrartion of EDRS

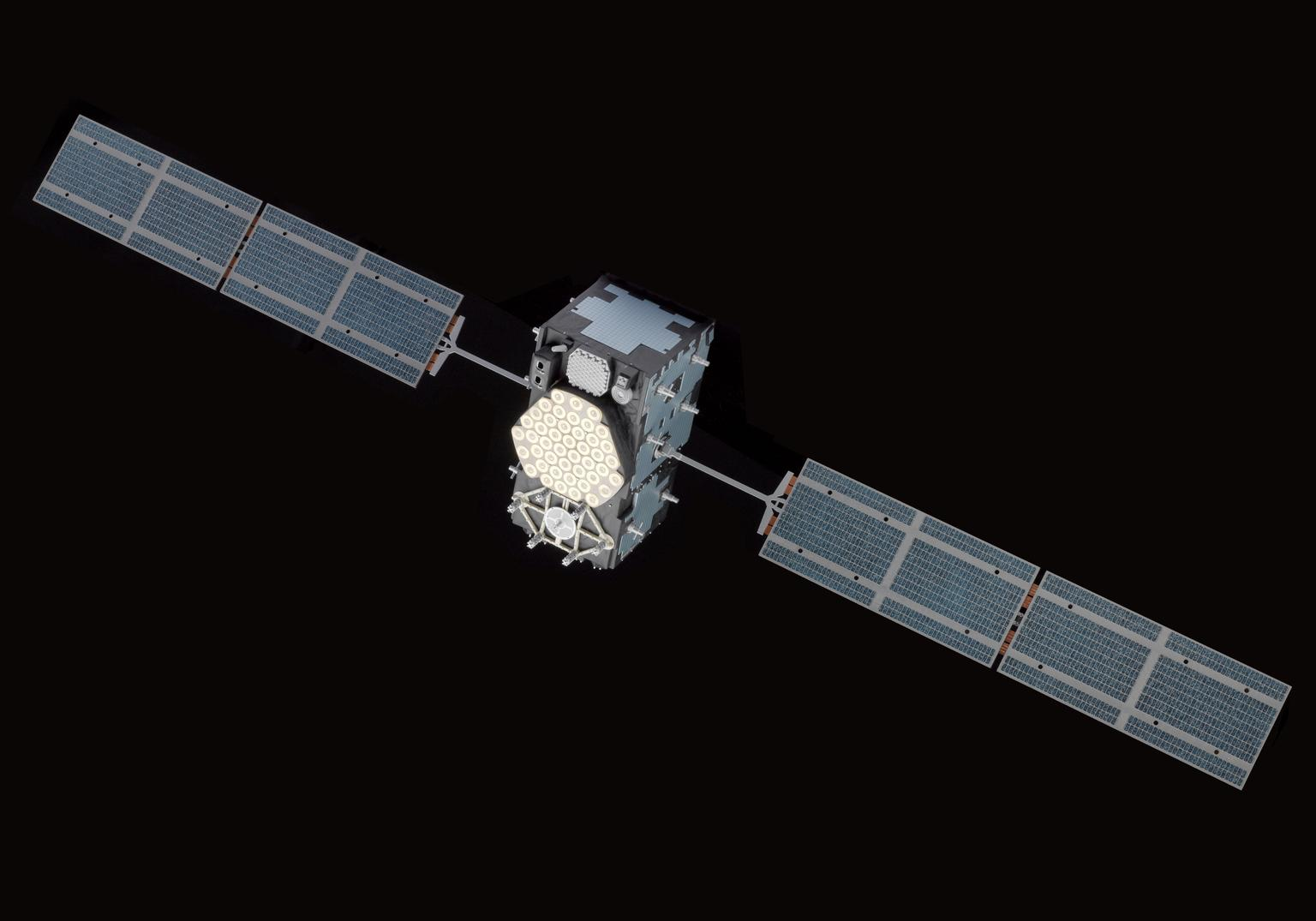
Model of a Galileo satellite

- OTS-1 and OTS-2, launched September 1977 and May 1978, completed – demonstration mission for a geostationary communications satellite system. OTS-1 was lost in a launch failure
- MARECS family, launched December 1981 to November 1984, completed – joint Inmarsat–ESA program which launched a satellite duo to create a global maritime communications network. MARECS B failed on launch
- ECS family, launched June 1983 to July 1988, completed – joint Eutelsat–ESA mission to launch the first generation of EUTELSAT telecommunication satellites
- Olympus, launched July 1989, completed – telecommunications mission pioneering high-power transmitters, multi-spot beam K_{a} band technology and on-board switching
- Artemis, launched in July 2001, completed – geostationary telecommunications satellite and technology demonstrator
- GIOVE-A, launched December 2005, completed – demonstration mission testing technologies for the Galileo satellite navigation system
- GIOVE-B, launched April 2008, completed – second demonstration mission testing technologies for the Galileo satellite navigation system. Retired in 2012
- Galileo, launched October 2011 onward, operational – joint ESA–EUSPA geodesy project to create an indigenous global navigation satellite system independent of the Russian GLONASS, Chinese BeiDou and American GPS systems
- Alphasat, launched July 2013, operational – joint Inmarsat–ESA mission to launch an advanced geostationary communication satellite to serve Africa, Asia and Europe; the largest ever built by Europe
- GOMX-3, launched in 2015, completed – ESA's first technology demonstration CubeSat
- European Data Relay System (EDRS), launched January 2016 to 2017, operational – geosynchronous optical communication network consisting a constellation of two satellites, EDRS-A and EDRS-C
- ESAIL, launched in 2020, completed – microsatellite for tracking ships worldwide
- JoeySat, launched in 2023, completed – joint ESA–Eutelsat OneWeb 5G connectivity technology demonstration satellite
- Spainsat NG, first launch in 2025, operational – Spanish satellites for government and military secure communications
- MICE-1, launched in 2025, operational – maritime tracking cubesat
- PHASMA (LAMARR and DIRAC), launched in 2025, operational – radio frequency spectrum monitoring cubesats
- Celeste (LEO-PNT), first launch in 2026, operational – a 10-satellite low earth orbit technology demonstration constellation for improving navigation services
- ERMIS, launched in 2026, operational – a 3-cubesat low earth orbit constellation for testing communication technologies
- OptiSat, launched in 2026, operational – laser communication cubesat
- PeakSat, launched in 2026, operational – laser communication cubesat
- Hellenic Space Dawn, launched in 2026, operational – two cubesats demonstrating optical communication and on-board data processing
- CyberCUBE, launched in 2026, operational – cybersecurity cubesat
- Eagle-1, launch planned for 2026, future – joint ESA–EU quantum key distribution satellite
- HummingSat, first launch in 2027, future – new class of micro-geostationary satellites, one-tenth the volume of traditional GEO satellites. A joint project with the Swiss company SWISSto12
- INFLECION, fully operational by 2028, future – joint ESA–UKSA–AAC Clyde Space maritime domain awareness satellite constellation
- SAGA, future – joint ESA–EU quantum key distribution satellite demonstration mission focused on classified and critical data flows
- Q-Design, future – joint ESA–Hispasat project for quantum key distribution from GEO and LEO orbits
- QKDSat, future – joint ESA–Honeywell quantum key distribution satellite
- OpSTAR, launch planned for 2029, future – demonstration of optical technologies for navigation
- IRIS², launching 2027 onward, future – multi-orbit satellite internet constellation
- Electra, launch date unknown, future – joint ESA–SES telecommunications mission, using a spacecraft with electrical-powered propulsion
- HydRON, launch date unknown, future – advanced laser-based satellite communication system

== Other missions ==
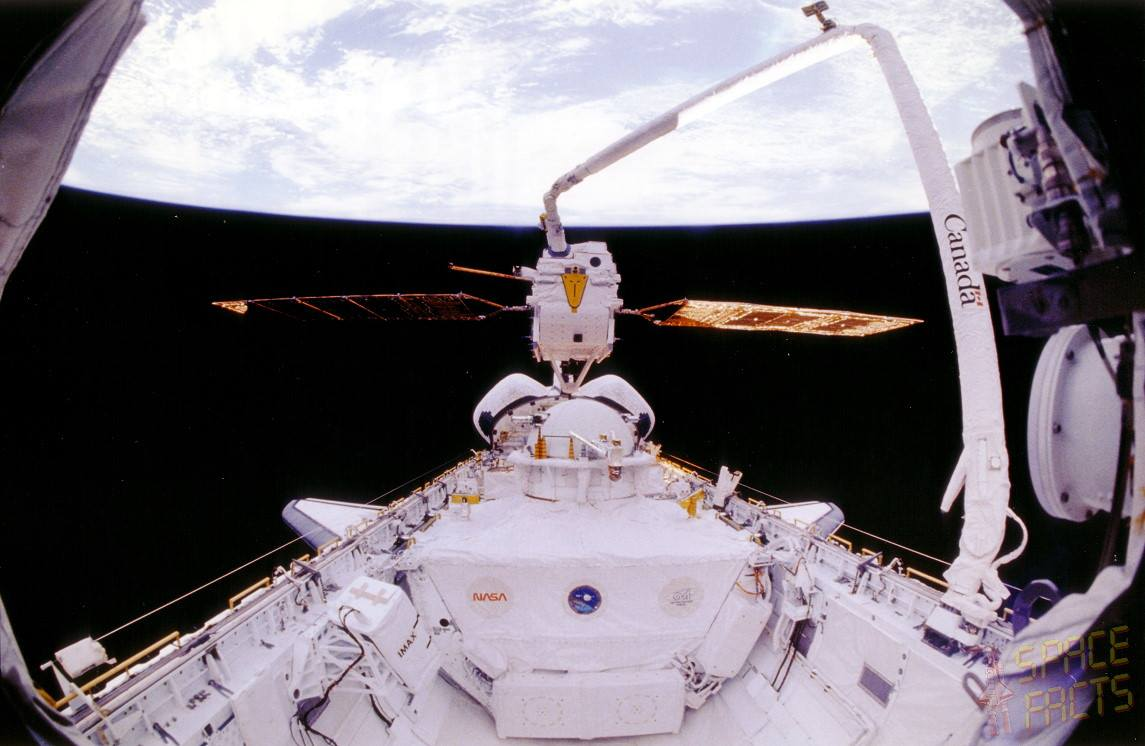
ESA's Eureca during deployment from Space Shuttle Atlantis in 1992

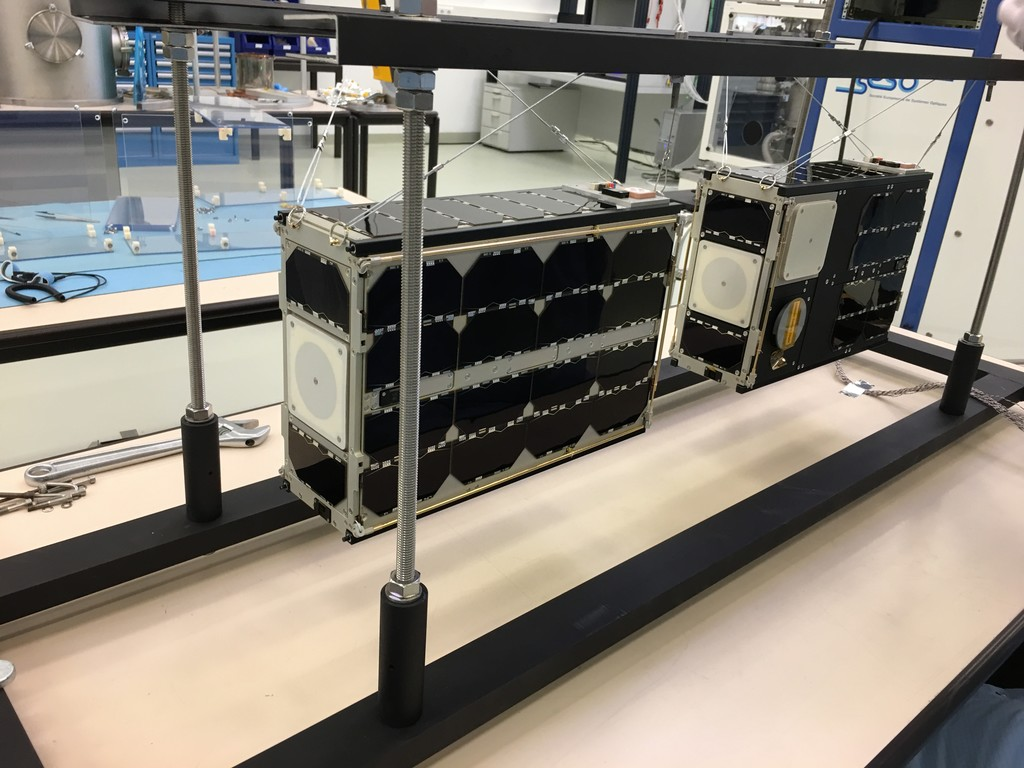
GomX-4A (left) and GomX-4B (right)

- CAT-1, launched in 1979, completed – vehicle evaluation satellite on Ariane 1
- EURECA, launched August 1992, completed – microgravity testbed mission carrying a suite of fifteen instruments from various European national space administrations
- YES, launched October 1997, completed – technology demonstration satellite built by young engineers and students
- SSETI Express, launched October 2005, completed – student demonstration mission, sponsored by the ESA Education Office, which launched three CubeSats to take pictures of the Earth and serve as a radio transponder
- YES2, launched September 2007, completed – student demonstration mission, sponsored by the ESA Education Office, which deployed a 31.7 km-long space tethered constellation of satellites. Partial launch failure
- GOMX-4B, launched in 2018, completed – cubesat demonstrating formation flying
- OPS-SAT, launched in 2019, completed – on-board computer technology demonstration cubesat
- YPSat-1, launched July 2024, completed – satellite designed and produced entirely by young professionals at ESA, launched aboard the inaugural flight of Ariane 6 to record the fairing separation and provide in-orbit imagery of the Earth
- GENA-OT, launched in 2025, operational – in-orbit demonstration (IOD) of an IOD platform
- GOMX-5, launched in 2026, operational – technology demonstration satellite
- ΣYNDEO‑3, launching in 2026, future – technology demonstration satellite funded by EU
- Cassini, launching in 2026, future – technology demonstration satellite funded by EU
- e.Inspector, launching in 2027, future – technology demonstration satellite for space debris inspection
- Corvus-IOV, launching in 2027, future – technology demonstration satellite with space debris monitoring payload
- YPSat-2, launching in 2027, future – second project by ESA Young Professionals, an experiment flying aboard Space Rider to study how microgravity affects blood flow in space
- ASTRAL, launching in 2028, future – demonstration of in-space refueling
- SOLARIS, first launch planned for 2030s, future (proposed) – demonstration of space-based solar power

== See also ==
- List of ESA CubeSats
- List of NASA missions
- List of ISRO missions
