= List of ESA CubeSats =

List of CubeSat-type small satellites by the European Space Agency

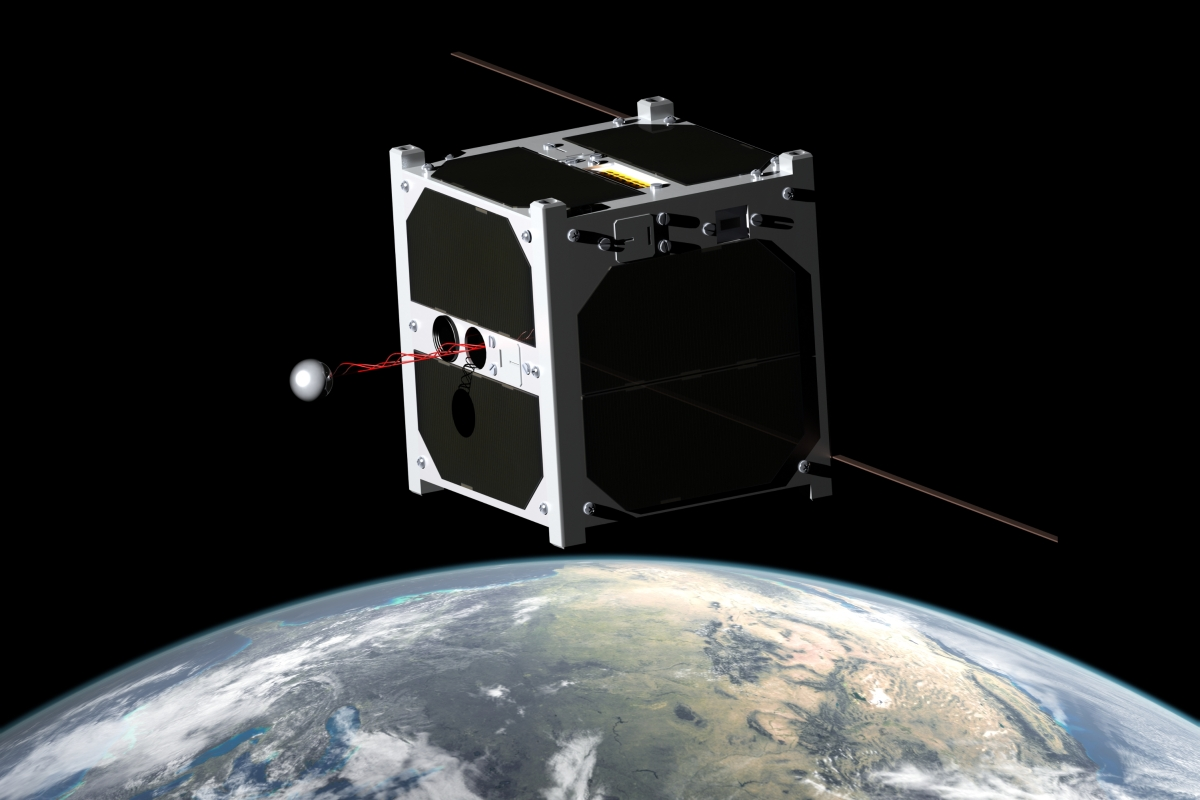
ESTCube-1, the first Estonian satellite

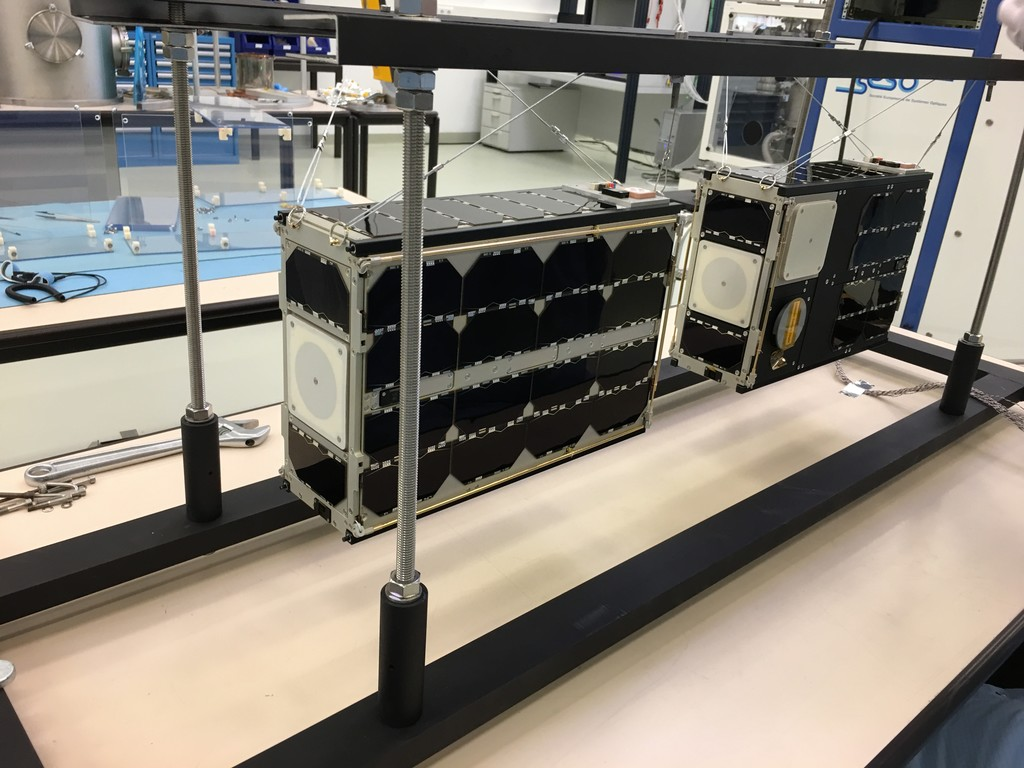
GomX-4A (left) and GomX-4B (right)

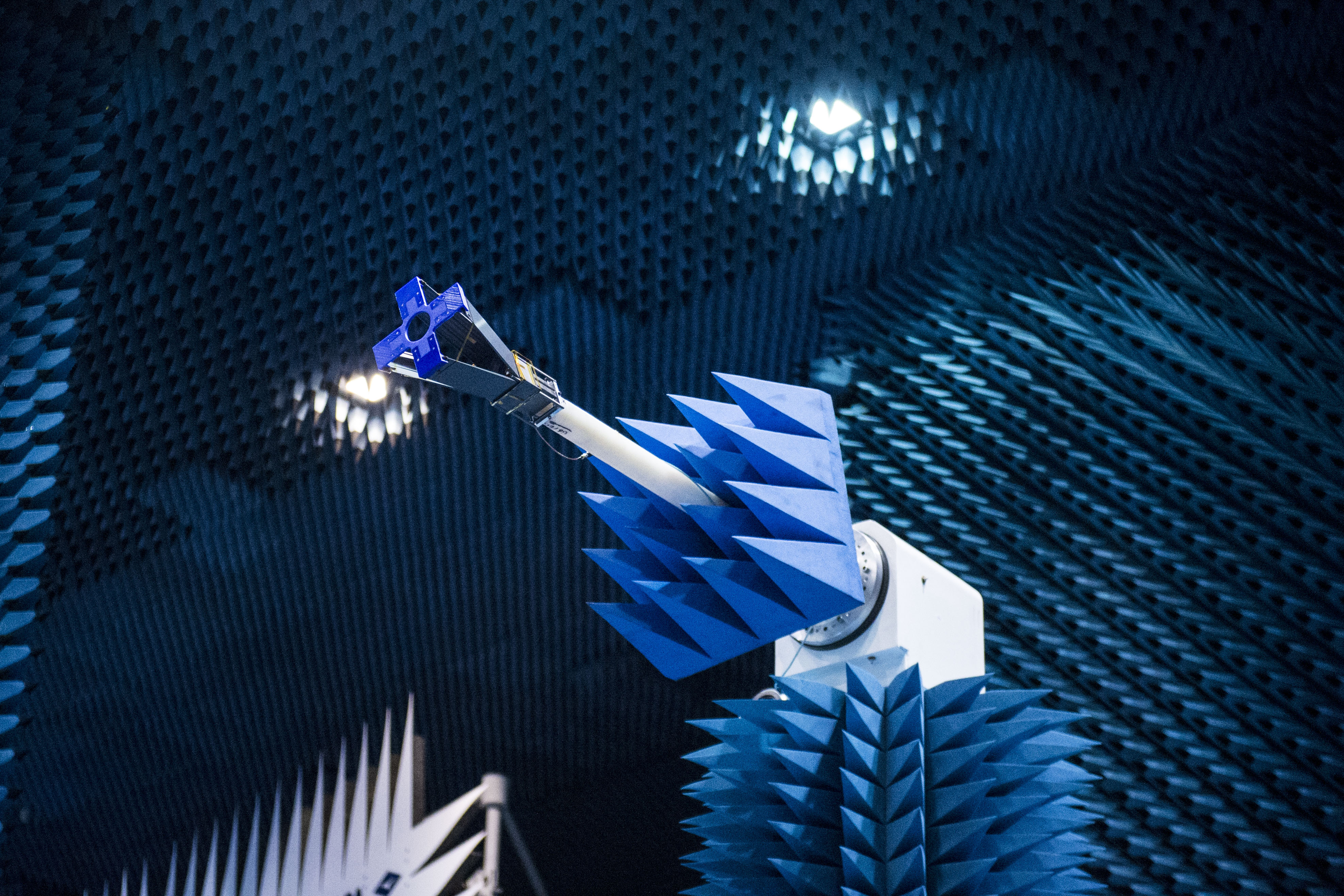
QARMAN CubeSat in test chamber

Since the 2010s, the European Space Agency (ESA) has supported the development or launch of numerous CubeSat-type small satellites through various programmes:

== General Support Technology Programme (GSTP) ==
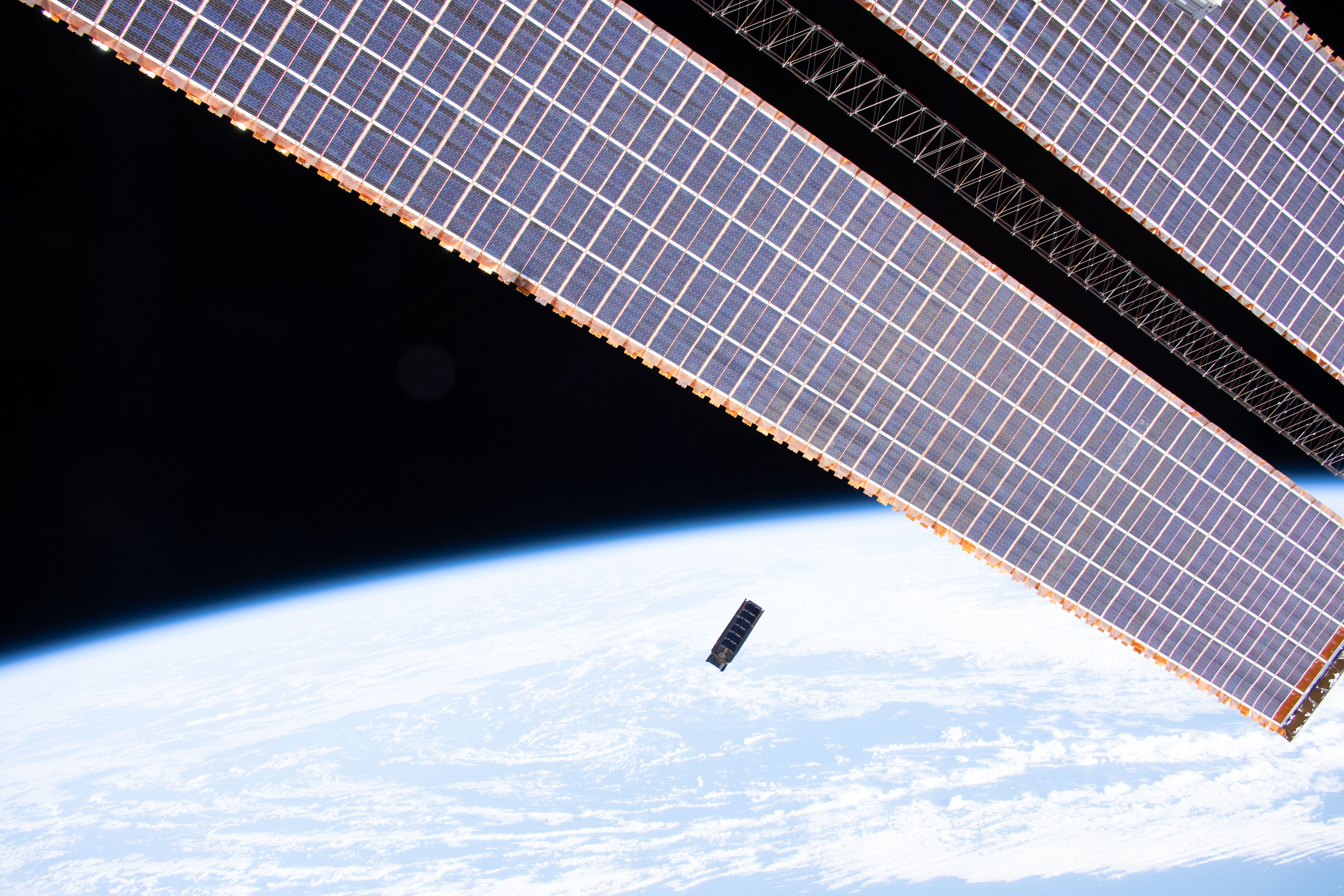
QARMAN CubeSat deployed from ISS

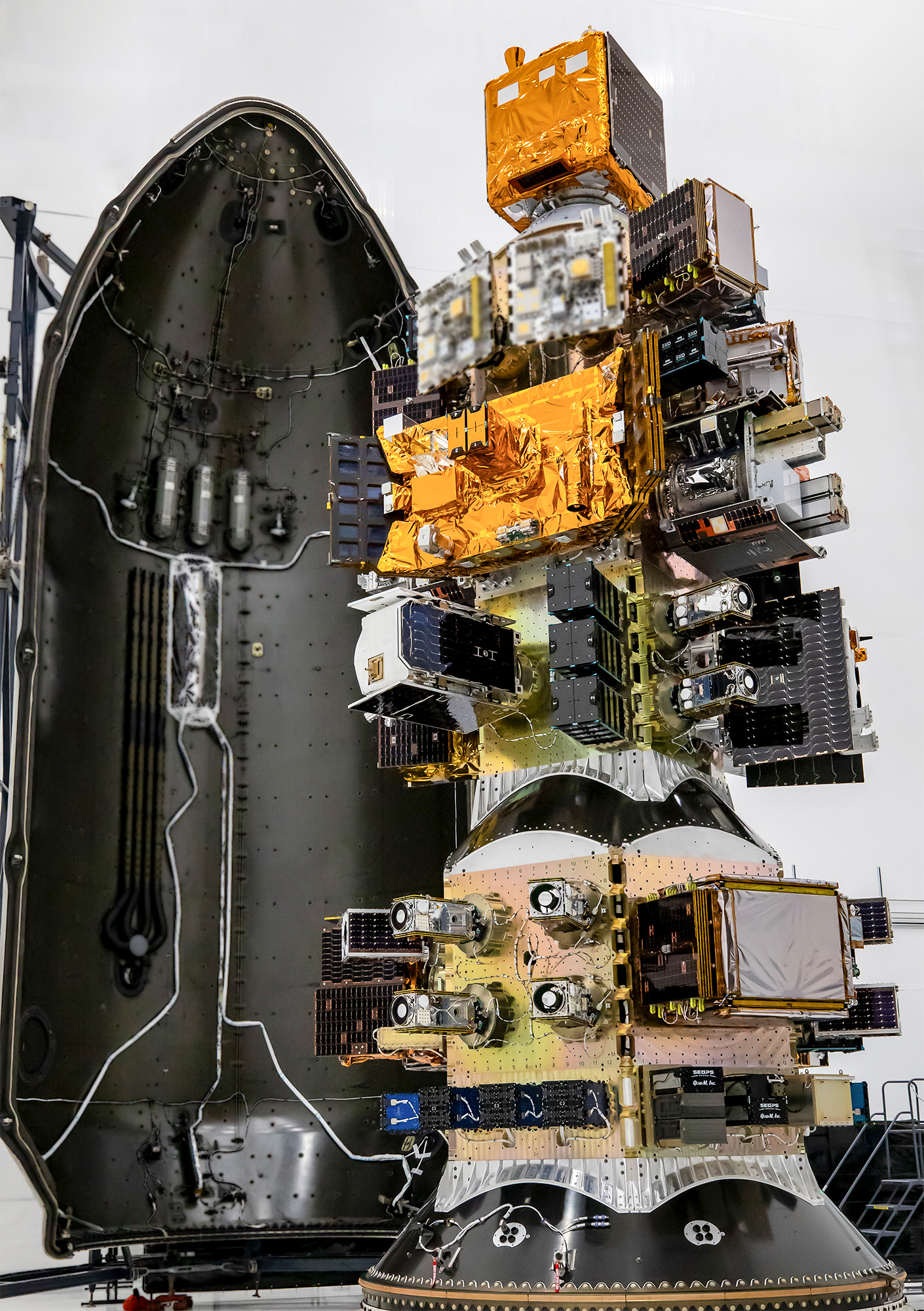
SpaceX Transporter-15 rideshare mission in November 2025 launched, among others, HydroGNSS, PHASMA, IRIDE EAGLET2 1–8, GENA-OT, MICE-1, and AIX-1+

GSTP also supports other non-CubeSat small satellite missions, e.g. MicroHETsat or the PROBA series.

- GOMX-3, launched in 2015
- GOMX-4B, launched in 2018
- QARMAN, launched in 2019
- OPS-SAT, launched in 2019
- SIMBA, launched in 2020
- PICASSO, launched in 2020
- RadCube, launched in 2021
- Sunstorm, launched in 2021
- OPS-SAT PRETTY, launched in 2023
- PROBA-V CubeSat Companion, launched in 2023
- GENA-OT, launched in 2025
- GOMX-5, launched in 2026
- CubeSpec, launching in 2027
- HENON, launching in 2027
- e.Inspector, launching in 2027
- VULCAIN, launching in 2027
- M-ARGO, launching in 2027
- LUMIO, launching in 2028
- AOS-P and AOS-D, launching in 2028
- SROC, launching with Space Rider in 2028

== Fly Your Satellite! (FYS) ==
FYS is an educational programme for student teams developing CubeSats or PocketQubes

- AAUSAT5, deployed from the ISS in 2015 (FYS Pilot Edition)
- e-sta@r-II, OUFTI-1, and AAUSAT4, launched in 2016 (FYS First Edition)
- LEDSAT, launched in 2021
- EIRSAT-1, launched in 2023
- ISTSat-1 and ^{3}Cat-4, launched in 2024
- FrontierSat, launched in 2026
- FramSat-1, launched in 2026
- CIMER, launching in 2027
- FEIsat
- AcubeSAT
- Da Vinci
- GIFTS

== InCubed ==
The InCubed co-funding programme, managed by ESA's Φ-lab, supports innovative technologies for Earth observation satellities.

- FOREST constellation, launching since 2022
- MANTIS, launched in 2023
- Hyperfield, hyperspectral imaging constellation, first satelllite launched in 2024
- AIX, launched in 2025
- HiVE, the High-precision Versatile Ecosphere constellation, first satellite launched in 2025
- TALISMAN, launching in 2027
- EARS, constellation of satellites for GNSS Radio Occultation

== Space Safety Programme (S2P) ==
- Juventas and Milani, launched in 2024 together with Hera
- PRELUDE, launching in 2027
- Farinella and Don Quijote, launching in 2028 together with Ramses
- Satis, launch planned for 2030

== Greek CubeSat In-Orbit Validation ==
- DUTHSat-2, launched in 2025
- MICE-1, launched in 2025
- PHASMA (LAMARR and DIRAC), launched in 2025
- ERMIS (3 CubeSats), launched in 2026
- OptiSat, launched in 2026
- PeakSat, launched in 2026
- Hellenic Space Dawn (Helios and Selene), launched in 2026

== IOD/IOV ==
IOD/IOV is a European Union programme funded through Horizon 2020 and entrusted to ESA. IOD/IOV also supports other non-CubeSat small satellite missions, e.g. ΣYNDEO‑3.

- Cassini, launching NET 2026
- Tom & Jerry, launching in 2027

== Other programmes ==
- ESTCube-1, launched in 2013
- Phi-Sat-1, launched in 2020 (FutureEO)
- Intuition-1, launched in 2023 (FutureEO)
- Phi-Sat-2, launched in 2024 (FutureEO)
- Spire Global SaaS, launched in 2026
- VIREON (2 CubeSats), launched in 2026
- CyberCUBE, launched in 2026
- Corvus-IOV, launching in 2027
- VMMO, launching in 2028 (Terrae Novae)

== See also ==
- List of European Space Agency programmes and missions
