= GENA-OT =

European technology demonstration CubeSat

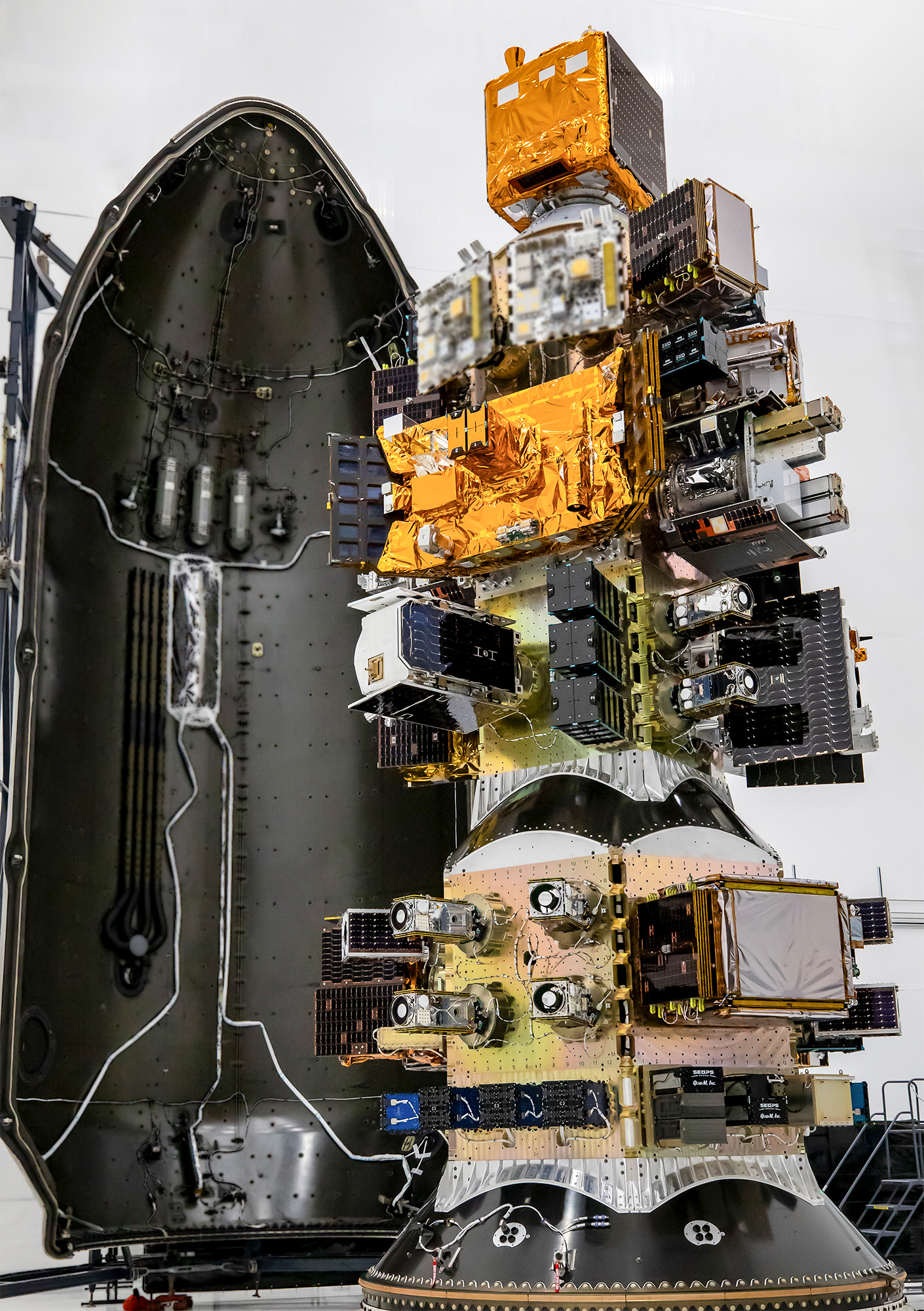
- SpaceX Transporter-15 rideshare mission including the GENA-OT satellite
- Mission type: Technology demonstration
- Operator: European Space Agency
- COSPAR ID: 2025-276BB
- SATCAT no.: 66715
- Website: seranis.de/mission-3
- Mission duration: 10 months, 29 days (in progress)

Spacecraft properties
- Spacecraft type: 16U CubeSat
- Manufacturer: (Germany) OroraTech

Start of mission
- Launch date: 28 November 2025, 18:44 UTC
- Rocket: Falcon 9 Transporter-15
- General Support Technology Programme (GSTP) Seamless Radio Access Network for Internet of Space (SeRANIS)

GENA-OT is a technology demonstration CubeSat mission developed by the European Space Agency (ESA) and OroraTech. In-Orbit Demonstration/Validation (IOD/IOV) is the practice of testing innovative technologies by flying them in Earth orbit before they can be used on operational space missions. GENA-OT is an In-Orbit Demonstration (IOD) of a generic, flexible IOD/IOV satellite platform. GENA-OT launched in November 2025 on the Falcon 9 flight Transporter-15 and began its orbital operations.

== Payload ==
The satellite payload space has been acquired by the University of the Bundeswehr Munich. As part of the research program SeRANIS, the research center SPACE of the university developed and delivered most of the payloads for GENA-OT. One of the other payloads is SpaceRadMon, an instrument for monitoring effects of space radiation on electronic component, developed by ESA and CERN. Another payload is the Icarus receiver of the Max Planck Society's ICARUS Initiative for global wildlife tracking from space.

== See also ==
- List of European Space Agency programmes and missions
- List of spaceflight launches in October–December 2025
- Other ESA missions launching on Falcon 9 Transporter-15:
  - IRIDE EAGLET2 1–8
  - HydroGNSS
  - PHASMA
  - MICE-1
  - AIX-1+
