= MICE-1 =

European CubeSat for maritime tracking

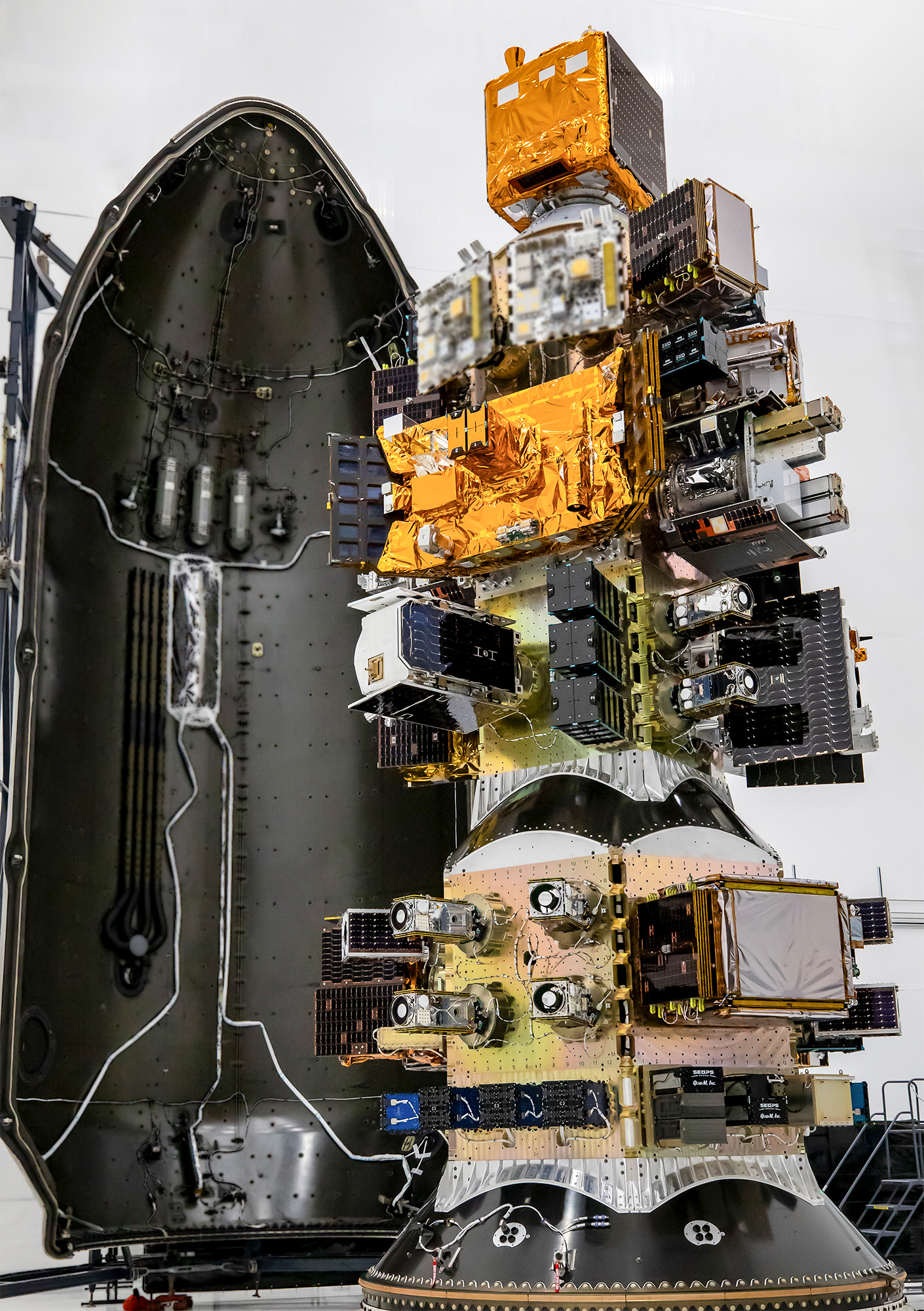
- The Transporter-15 Mission which launched MICE-1 along with several other satellites
- Operator: (Greece) Prisma Electronics, Hellenic Space Center, European Space Agency
- COSPAR ID: 2025-276DP
- SATCAT no.: 66775
- Mission duration: 10 months, 29 days (in progress)

Spacecraft properties
- Spacecraft type: 3U CubeSat

Start of mission
- Launch date: 28 November 2025, 18:44 UTC
- Rocket: Falcon 9 Transporter 15

Orbital parameters
- Reference system: Geocentric
- Regime: Sun-synchronous

MICE-1 (Maritime Identification and Communication systEm – 1) is a CubeSat mission for maritime tracking developed by the Greek company Prisma Electronics S.A. with the support of the Democritus University of Thrace, the EU, and ESA. The satellite's primary payload is an Automated Identification System (AIS) receiver intended to enhance tracking of ships and other maritime assets in the Mediterranean Sea. The secondary payload is an Internet of Things (IoT) instrument, part of Prisma Electronics' LAROS system for remote monitoring of structural, environmental, and energy footprint of infrastructure. The mission is supported by ESA's Greek CubeSat In-Orbit Validation programme. MICE-1 was launched on the SpaceX Falcon 9 flight Transporter-15 in November 2025.

== See also ==
- List of European Space Agency programmes and missions
- List of spaceflight launches in October–December 2025
- Other ESA missions launching on Falcon 9 Transporter-15:
  - IRIDE EAGLET2 1–8
  - HydroGNSS
  - GENA-OT
  - PHASMA
  - AIX-1+
