= Cinzia Zuffada =

Italian-American engineer

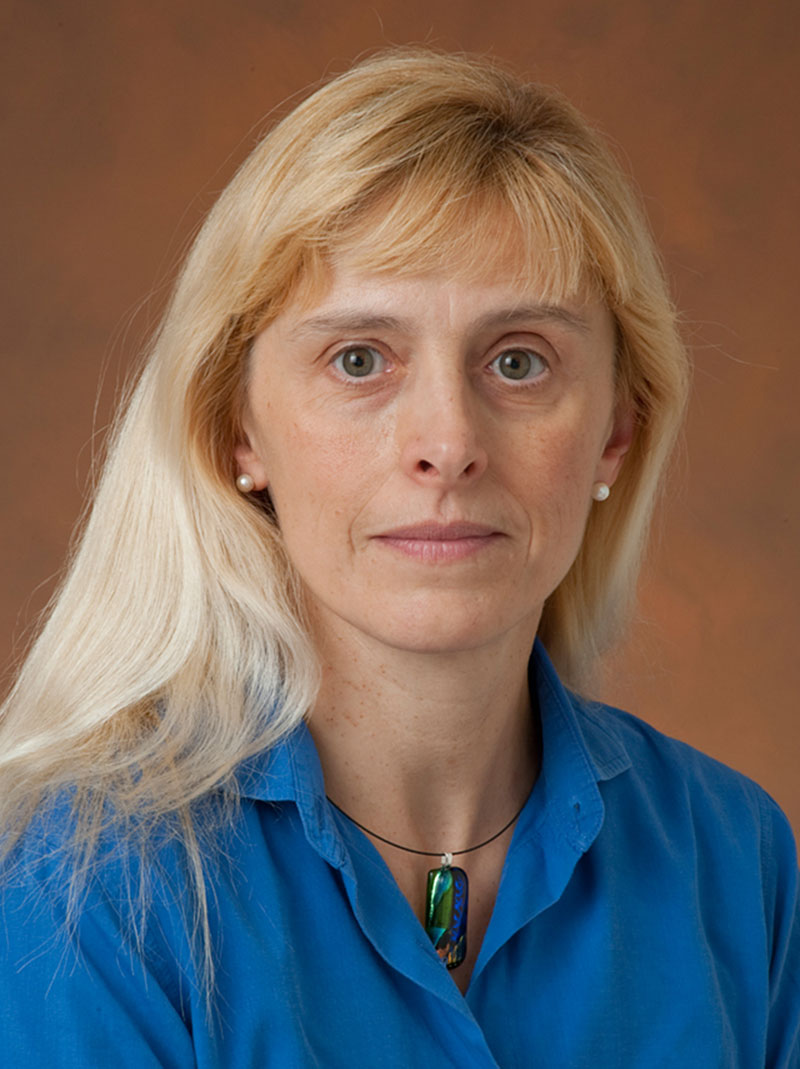
- Official photograph of Zuffada at the Jet Propulsion Laboratory, circa 2019
- Born: 1956 (age 69–70); Broni
- Education: University of Pavia
- Scientific career
- Workplaces: California Institute of Technology; Jet Propulsion Laboratory

Cinzia Zuffada (born 1956) is an Italian-American engineer who is the Associate Chief Scientist at the Jet Propulsion Laboratory. Her role considers the strategic planning of scientific programs for JPL and the development of reflectometry technologies for Global navigation satellite systems. She is the chair of the Board of the Italian Scientists & Scholars in North America Foundation.

== Early life and education ==
Zuffada was born in Broni. She studied electronic engineering at the University of Pavia. She remained at Pavia for her doctoral research. After graduating, she worked on Electromagnetic Fields Theory as postdoctoral research fellow. In 1985, she moved to the United States, where she worked as an Associate Senior Engineer at the Kaman Sciences Corporation. She joined the California Institute of Technology as a postdoctoral researcher.

== Research and career ==
Zuffada joined the Jet Propulsion Laboratory in 1992. Her early research considered the development of numerical methods to solve electromagnetic scattering problems, making use of supercomputers. She was made Associate Chief Scientist in 2007.

At JPL, Zuffada was made responsible for the development of reflectometry technologies for Global navigation satellite systems (GNSS). She has shown that GNSS is relevant for environmental monitoring, including ocean altimetry and hydrology. She performed the first high-precision altimetric measurements using Global Positioning System, showing that it was possible to measure surface height of the Crater Lake to 2 cm accuracy.

She is responsible for the cyclone GNSS (CYGNSS) mission, which looks to improve hurricane forecasting. It works by collecting reflected GNSS data and mapping peak reflected power. This reflected power is impacted by the presence of water and vegetation. The maps can provide dynamic information about moving weather systems. CYGNSS is currently involved with missions measuring tropical cyclones. She was promoted to Acting Chief Scientist in 2016. In this capacity she oversees strategic planning for science and manages investment in research and development.

She is a member of Science Advisory Group for ESA's HydroGNSS satellite mission demonstrating the use of GNSS reflectometry for monitoring the hydrological cycle.

Zuffada is interested in increasing research collaborations between the United States and Rome. She was made chair of the Board of the Italian Scientists & Scholars in North America Foundation in 2017.

== Awards and honors ==
- 2002 University of Pavia Teresian Medal
- 2014 Jet Propulsion Laboratory Magellan Award
- 2015 NASA Exceptional Scientific Achievement Medal
- 2016 Knighthood of the Order of Merit of Italy
- 2019 Ghislieri Life Achievement
- 2019 Embassy of the United States, Rome Science Fellow

== Selected publications ==
- Lowe, Stephen T.; LaBrecque, John L.; Zuffada, Cinzia; Romans, Larry J.; Young, Larry E.; Hajj, George A. (January 2002). "First spaceborne observation of an Earth-reflected GPS signal". Radio Science. 37 (1): 7–1–7–28. Bibcode:2002RaSc...37.1007L. doi:10.1029/2000rs002539. ISSN 0048-6604. S2CID 16463041.
- Lowe, Stephen T.; Zuffada, Cinzia; Chao, Yi; Kroger, Peter; Young, Larry E.; LaBrecque, John L. (2002). "5-cm-Precision aircraft ocean altimetry using GPS reflections". Geophysical Research Letters. 29 (10): 13–1–13–4. Bibcode:2002GeoRL..29.1375L. doi:10.1029/2002GL014759. ISSN 1944-8007. S2CID 15749575.
- Hajj, George A.; Zuffada, Cinzia (2003). "Theoretical description of a bistatic system for ocean altimetry using the GPS signal". Radio Science. 38 (5): 1089. Bibcode:2003RaSc...38.1089H. doi:10.1029/2002RS002787. ISSN 1944-799X. S2CID 16607183.
