= HydroGNSS =

European Earth observation satellite mission

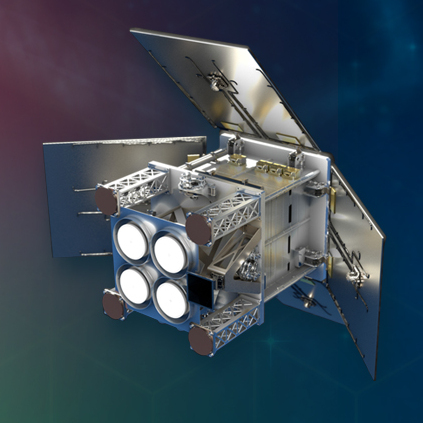
- Mission type: Earth observation satellite
- Operator: ESA
- COSPAR ID: HydroGNSS 1: 2025-276AG; HydroGNSS 2: 2025-276AH
- Website: hydrognss.org
- Mission duration: 11 months, 11 days (in progress)

Spacecraft properties
- Manufacturer: Surrey Satellite Technology

Start of mission
- Launch date: 28 November 2025, 18:44 UTC
- Rocket: Falcon 9 Transporter-15
- Launch site: SLC-4E

Orbital parameters
- Reference system: Geocentric
- Regime: Sun-synchronous
- Altitude: 550 km
- ESA insingia FutureEO FutureEO: Scout missions

Remote sensing system using GNSS reflectometry

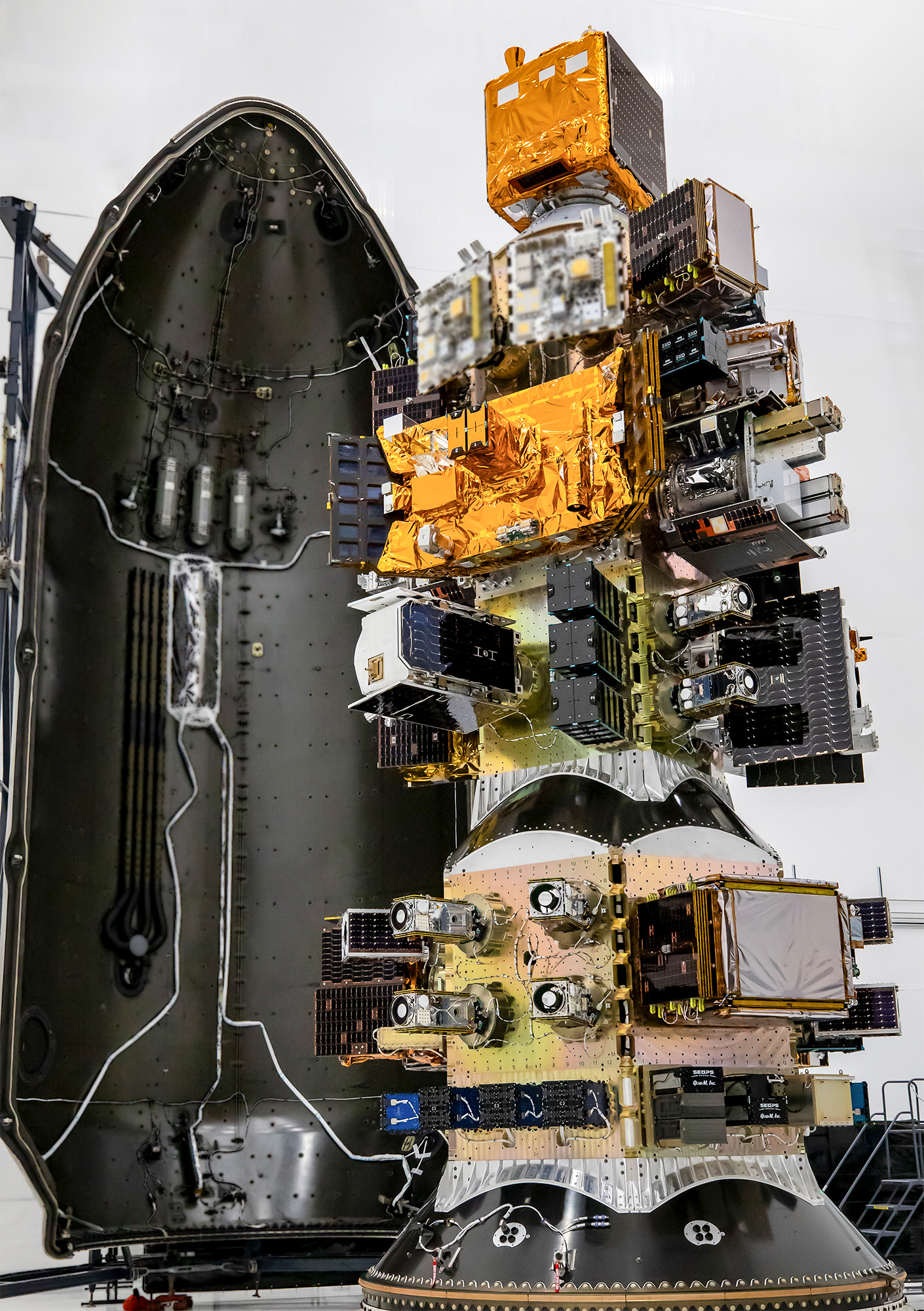
SpaceX Transporter-15 rideshare mission

HydroGNSS (Hydrological Global Navigation Satellite System) is an Earth observation satellite mission by the European Space Agency (ESA) consisting of two identical small satellites carrying GNSS reflectometry instruments. The mission is using satellite navigation signals reflected from the Earth surface to monitor various Essential Climate Variables related to the hydrological cycle. It was launched in November 2025 on a Falcon 9 rocket.

== Objectives ==
HydroGNSS is designed to deliver data on four hydrological parameters aligned with Essential Climate Variables:

- soil moisture
- inundation or wetlands
- freeze/thaw state
- above-ground biomass

The mission's secondary objectives are to measure wind speed over the ocean and sea-ice extent.

== Background ==
The project builds upon previous GNSS reflectometry satellite missions—the CYGNSS constellation by NASA and the TechDemoSat-1 demonstrator by ESA and UKSA. Surrey Satellite Technology Ltd., the prime contractor for HydroGNSS, was involved in both these missions.

HydroGNSS is launching as the first mission of ESA's Scout series of missions, within the FutureEO programme, although it bears the designation Scout-2. That is because the Scout-1 mission CubeMAP was cancelled before its launch due to budgetary constraints. ESA requires each Scout mission to move to launch within three years after kick-off and with a budget under €35 million.

== Project history ==
In March 2021, ESA has decided to implement HydroGNSS as the second of its new Scout series of missions within the FutureEO programme. In October 2021, ESA has signed a contract with Surrey Satellite Technology to build the mission. In March 2023, ESA has decided to build two HydroGNSS satellites instead of just one.

In August 2025, the two satellites have passed their Flight Acceptance Review. In September 2025, the two satellites have been transported to California for launch on Falcon 9 later that year. After testing, propellant loading, battery charging, and launch adapter integration, the two spacecraft were pronounced ready for launch by ESA in November 2025.

The two satellites were launched on 28 November 2025 at 18:44 UTC from Vandenberg Space Force Base on the SpaceX Falcon 9 Transporter-15 rideshare mission and separated from the rocket less than 90 minutes after liftoff. At 21:45 UTC, Surrey Satellite Technology confirmed that they had received first signals from the satellites.

On 19 December 2025, SSTL reported that both HydroGNSS satellites were already collecting Delay Doppler Maps of reflected GNSS signals. One example dataset was collected by HydroGNSS 2 over Central Africa on 5 December 2025, 7 days after launch. In March 2026, SSTL reported that the two spacecraft, still in their commissioning phase, were successfully collecting "promising early measurements" and published a video of the mission's Delay Doppler Maps generated over France, the Mediterranean Sea, and north and east Africa. In July 2026, HydroGNSS completed commissioning and begun full scientific operations.

== See also ==
- List of European Space Agency programmes and missions
- List of spaceflight launches in October–December 2025
- Living Planet Programme
- List of Earth observation satellites
- National Oceanography Centre
- Cinzia Zuffada
- Other ESA missions launching on Falcon 9 Transporter-15:
  - IRIDE EAGLET2 1–8
  - GENA-OT
  - MICE-1
  - PHASMA
  - AIX-1+
