= ICARUS Initiative =

Project tracking animals from space

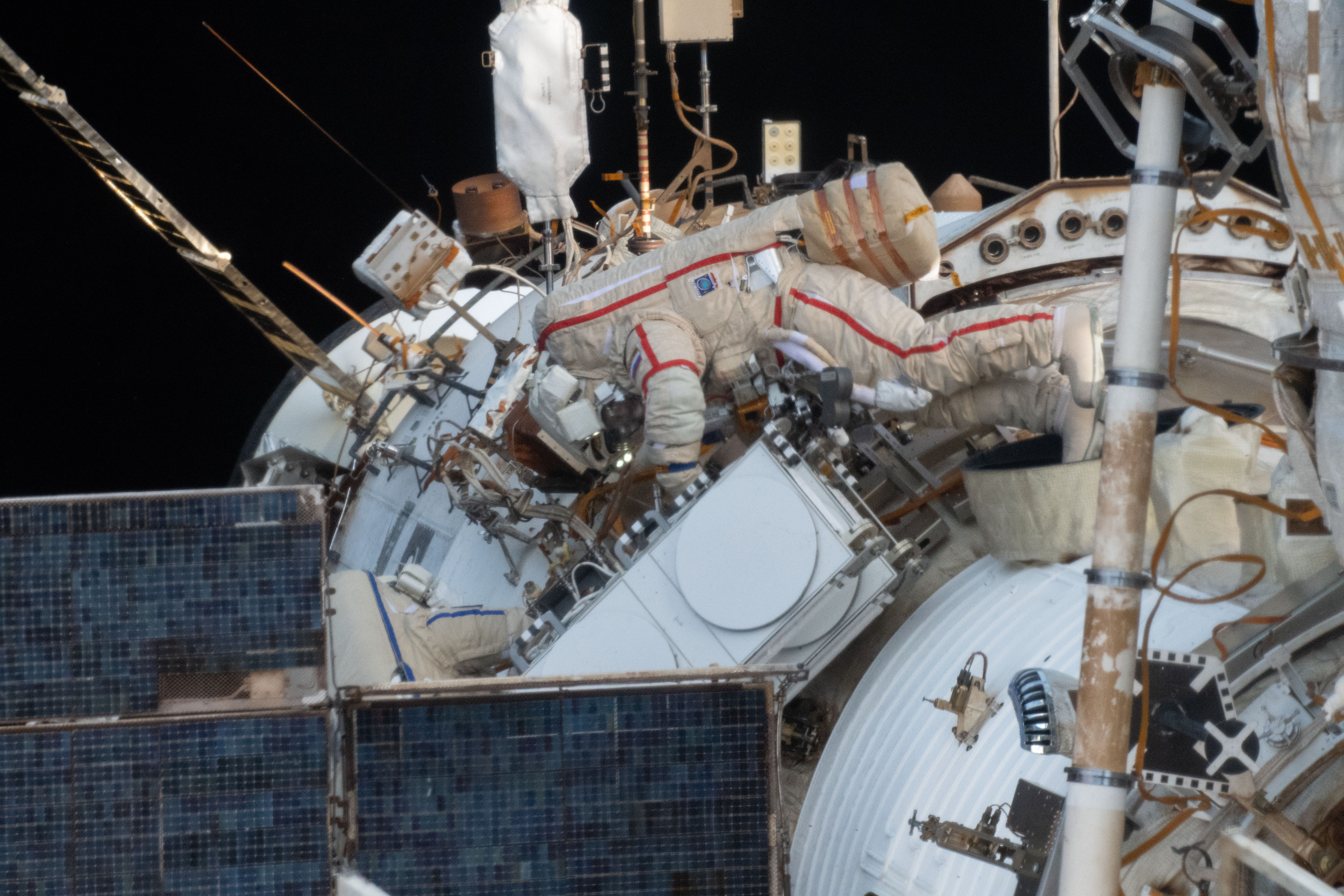
Installation of the ICARUS antenna on the ISS

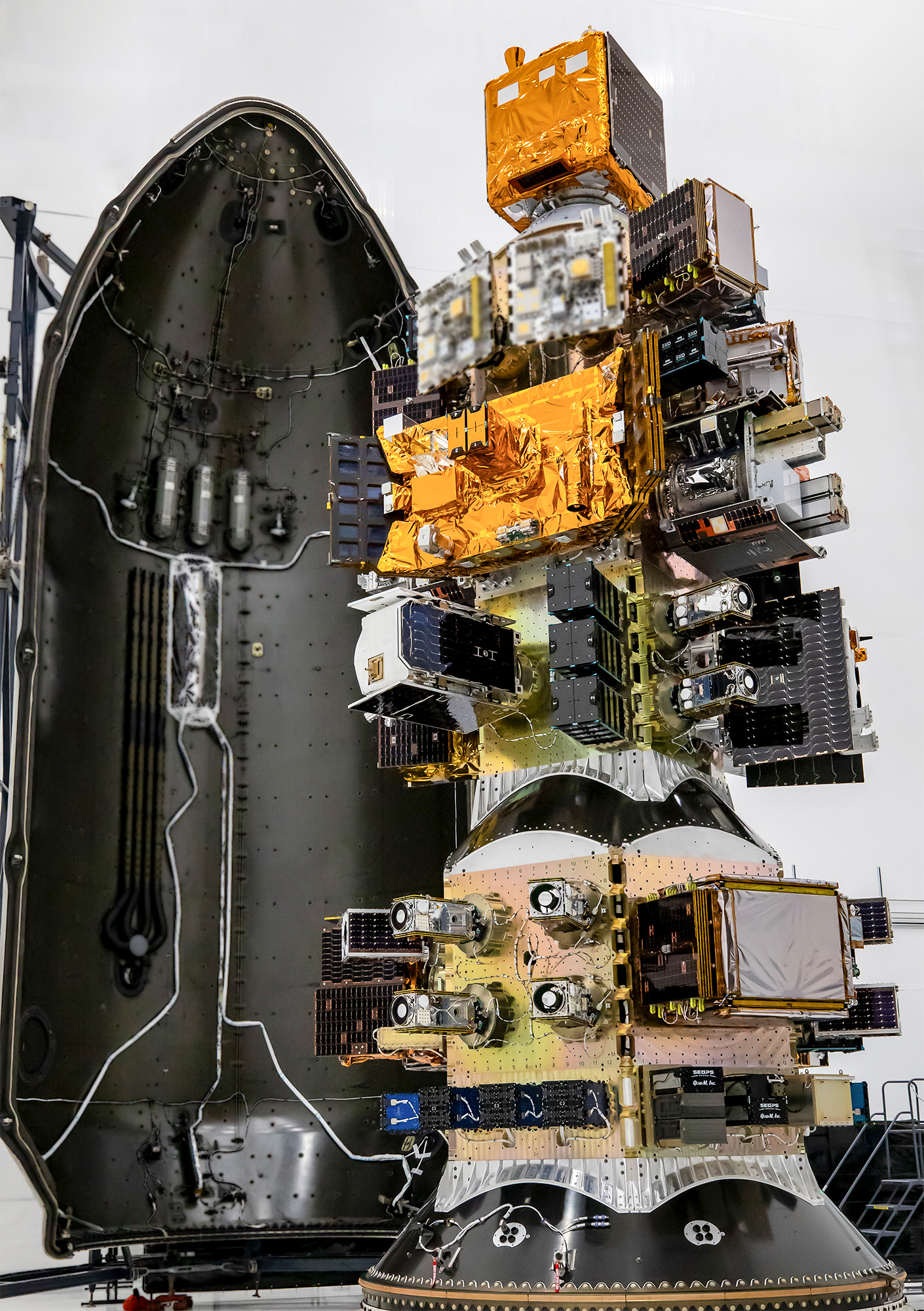
SpaceX Transporter-15 rideshare mission with the GENA-OT satellite carrying an ICARUS instrument

The ICARUS Initiative (International Cooperation for Animal Research Using Space) is an international effort to track the migratory patterns of small flying animals using radio transmitters. The project began in 2002. The first tracking system operated on the International Space Station (ISS) between 2020 and 2022. The second system (ICARUS 2.0) consists of receivers aboard multiple uncrewed low Earth orbit satellites, first of which was launched in 2025. The project is led by Martin Wikelski, director of the Max Planck Institute of Animal Behavior in Radolfzell and a professor of ornithology at the University of Konstanz.

== Technology ==
Since the late 1980s animal tracking via satellite has been accomplished through the use of the Argos system, which was historically limited to larger animals. One major hurdle to tracking the movements of birds and especially insects is creating a transmitter small enough to place on individual animals.

The ICARUS project originally implemented 5 g radio transmitters that included a GPS receiver, but had plans to use devices weighing less than 1 g in the future. In 2026, when the ICARUS 2.0 constellation became operational, multiple versions of transmitters were available. The largest were around 4 g and included solar panels. The smallest, used on small birds and insects, had a mass of around 1 g and were powered by batteries with lifetime of about a year.

Since the ICARUS system is located on lower orbits than Argos—ISS is orbiting 370–460 km (230–290 mi) and GENA-OT, as well as RAVEN, at around 520 km (320 mi) from the Earth's surface instead of 850 km (530 mi) like the Argos satellites—the ICARUS trackers do not have to create as strong of a radio signal and can therefore be smaller. The transmitter tags only activate when a satellite passes over them.

== Applications ==
The primary purpose of the ICARUS Initiative is to greatly expand available data on animal migrations and other movements for the sake of conservation. For example, tagged animals like cheetahs, zebras, and giraffes can reveal the activity of rhinoceros poachers in real time. However, a variety of other fields of study may be advanced by the project's information gathering. Studying the movements of birds and insects may further scientists' understanding of how natural hazards and human interactions affect animal populations. Another application for the data collected by ICARUS is to investigate a possible link between unusual animal movements and impending earthquakes. It has long been hypothesized that some birds and bats can predict earthquakes because of their ability to detect shifts in magnetic fields, but so far the only evidence to support this has been anecdotal. The project's migratory data may also provide greater insight into the propagation of animal-borne diseases like SARS, bird flu, and West Nile virus.

== History ==
=== ICARUS on ISS ===
The installation of the necessary hardware on the Russian segment of the International Space Station was completed in 2018. However, a defect in the ICARUS computer system meant it had to be returned to Earth, fixed, and transported back to the station in 2019. Testing for the monitoring system began in March 2020 and scientific operations officially started in September. Data transmissions from the ISS were terminated on 3 March 2022 when the collaboration between Germany and Russia was cancelled after the Russian invasion of Ukraine.

=== ICARUS 2.0 ===
On 28 November 2025, the first ICARUS 2.0 instrument was launched aboard the ESA-supported technology demonstration satellite GENA-OT developed by the German company OroraTech. One more receiver was expected to launch in 2026 and by 2027, a constellation of six receivers was expected to be operational in low Earth orbit. In January 2026, German company TALOS and Bulgarian satellite manufacturer EnduroSat partnered up to build five operational satellites for the ICARUS 2.0 constellation.

On 3 May 2026, the first operational ICARUS 2.0 satellite called RAVEN was launched on Falcon 9's CAS500-2 mission. RAVEN was partially funded by the National Geographic Society. Two further ICARUS 2.0 launches were expected in 2026 and two more in spring 2027. At the time of RAVEN's launch, approximately 3,000 tags were ready to be attached to animals and 3,000 more have been ordered.

== Satellites ==
ICARUS 2.0 satellites
Name	COSPAR ID	Satellite bus	Manufacturer	Launch date	Launch vehicle	Flight
GENA-OT	2025-276BB	16U CubeSat	OroraTech	28 November 2025, 18:44 UTC	Falcon 9	Transporter-15
RAVEN	2026-100F	6U CubeSat	EnduroSat & TALOS	3 May 2026, 7:00 UTC	Falcon 9	CAS500-2 rideshare

== Supporters ==
- DLR Institute for Planetary Research
- European Space Agency
- Food and Agriculture Organization
- UNEP/CMS (United Nations Environment Programme - Convention on migratory species)

== See also ==
- Motus (wildlife tracking network)
- List of European Space Agency programmes and missions
