= PHASMA =

European CubeSat mission

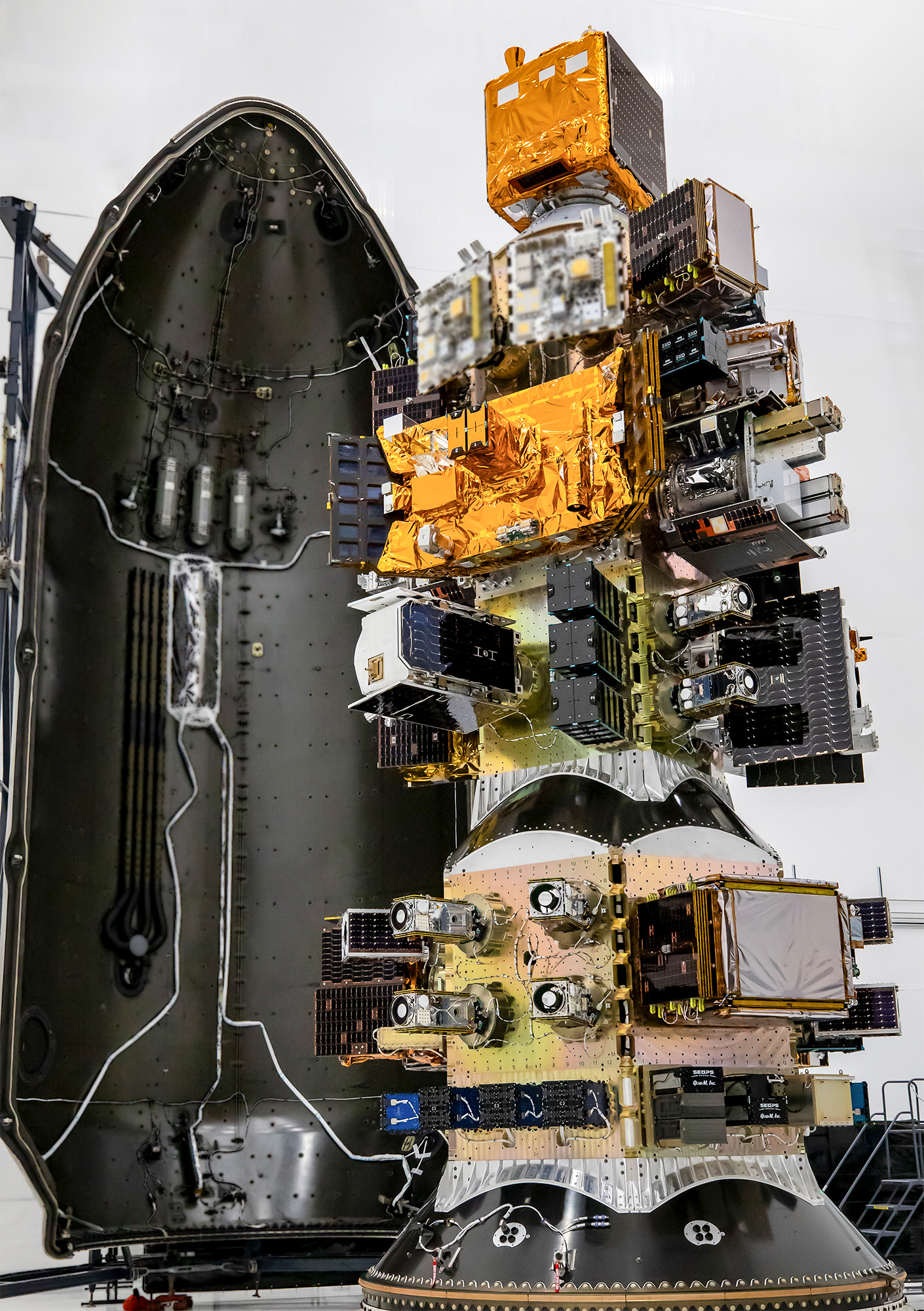
- The Transporter-15 Mission which launched PHASMA along with several other satellites
- Operator: (Greece) Libre Space Foundation, Hellenic Space Center, European Space Agency
- COSPAR ID: LAMARR: 2025-276DH; DIRAC: 2025-276DJ
- Mission duration: 10 months, 29 days (in progress)

Spacecraft properties
- Spacecraft type: 2x 3U CubeSat

Start of mission
- Launch date: 28 November 2025, 18:44 UTC
- Rocket: Falcon 9 Transporter 15

Orbital parameters
- Reference system: Geocentric
- Regime: Sun-synchronous

PHASMA is a radio frequency spectrum monitoring and space-based situational awareness mission developed by the Greek non-profit organisation Libre Space Foundation (LSF) with support of EU and ESA. The mission consists of two identical 3U CubeSats named LAMARR (after Hedy Lamarr) and DIRAC (after Paul Dirac) flying in close proximity of each other. They were both launched on the SpaceX Falcon 9 flight Transporter-15 in November 2025.

The goals of the mission are to quantify the global use of radio frequency spectrum, to locate sources of interference, to detect possible violations of signal transmission, as well as to monitor signal transmissions from other satellites. Initial reports from 2023 stated that the mission would consist of three CubeSats, but their number was later brought down to two. The mission is supported by ESA's Greek CubeSat In-Orbit Validation programme and the Libre Space Foundation received 2 million euros for its development.

== See also ==
- List of European Space Agency programmes and missions
- List of spaceflight launches in October–December 2025
- Other ESA missions launching on Falcon 9 Transporter-15:
  - IRIDE EAGLET2 1–8
  - HydroGNSS
  - GENA-OT
  - MICE-1
  - AIX-1+
