= OPS-SAT PRETTY =

ESA cube satellite

PRETTY OPS-SAT PRETTY
- Mission type: Earth observation satellite
- Operator: European Space Agency
- COSPAR ID: 2023-155H
- SATCAT no.: 58023

Spacecraft properties
- Spacecraft type: 3U CubeSat
- Manufacturer: Beyond Gravity Austria, TU Graz, Seibersdorf Labs

Start of mission
- Launch date: 9 October 2023
- Rocket: Vega, flight VV-23

End of mission
- Declared: October 2024

Orbital parameters
- Reference system: Geocentric
- Regime: Sun-synchronous
- Altitude: 568 km

OPS-SAT PRETTY (Passive REflecTomeTry and dosimetrY) is a CubeSat mission by the European Space Agency (ESA). The primary payload of the satellite is a passive reflectometer for GNSS reflectometry measuring sea state, sea ice, and ocean currents by receiving Galileo and GPS signals reflected from Earth surface. The secondary payload is a radiation monitor.

== History ==
The satellite was launched in October 2023 on a Vega rocket. In November 2025, maintenance of the satellite was transferred to the OPS-SAT Space Lab and the Graz University of Technology. The satellite was renamed from PRETTY to OPS-SAT PRETTY.

On 27 July 2026, OPS-SAT PRETTY was used as an example of voice recognition algorithms operating on CubeSat hardware. An operative spoke an authorization command followed by "PRETTY PLAY DOOM" twice, and the satellite was able to decode enough of the message to start and perform a replay of a demo file of the video game Doom. This was a continuation of similar code for Doom that had been deployed to the OPS-SAT-1 CubeSat.

== See also ==
- List of European Space Agency programmes and missions
- List of ESA CubeSats
