= CyberCUBE =

European cybersecurity satellite

- Mission type: Technology demonstration
- Operator: European Space Agency
- Mission duration: 1 year (planned)

Spacecraft properties
- Bus: 3U CubeSat
- Manufacturer: (Romania) (Spain) GMV

Start of mission
- Launch date: 7 July 2026, 7:12 UTC
- Rocket: Falcon 9

CyberCUBE is a European technology demonstration satellite developed by GMV for the European Space Agency (ESA). Its goal is to serve as a cost-effective, reconfigurable in-orbit testbed for demonstrating cybersecurity technologies protecting satellites as well as their ground segments. The 3U CubeSat was developed by GMV's Romanian team as the primary contractor with the support of the company's Spanish team and Alén Space. Its primary user is ESA's Cybersecurity Operations Centre (CSOC).

CyberCUBE was launched in July 2026 on the Transporter-17 flight of Falcon 9. In October 2026, the satellite completed commissioning and was handed over to ESA operations teams.

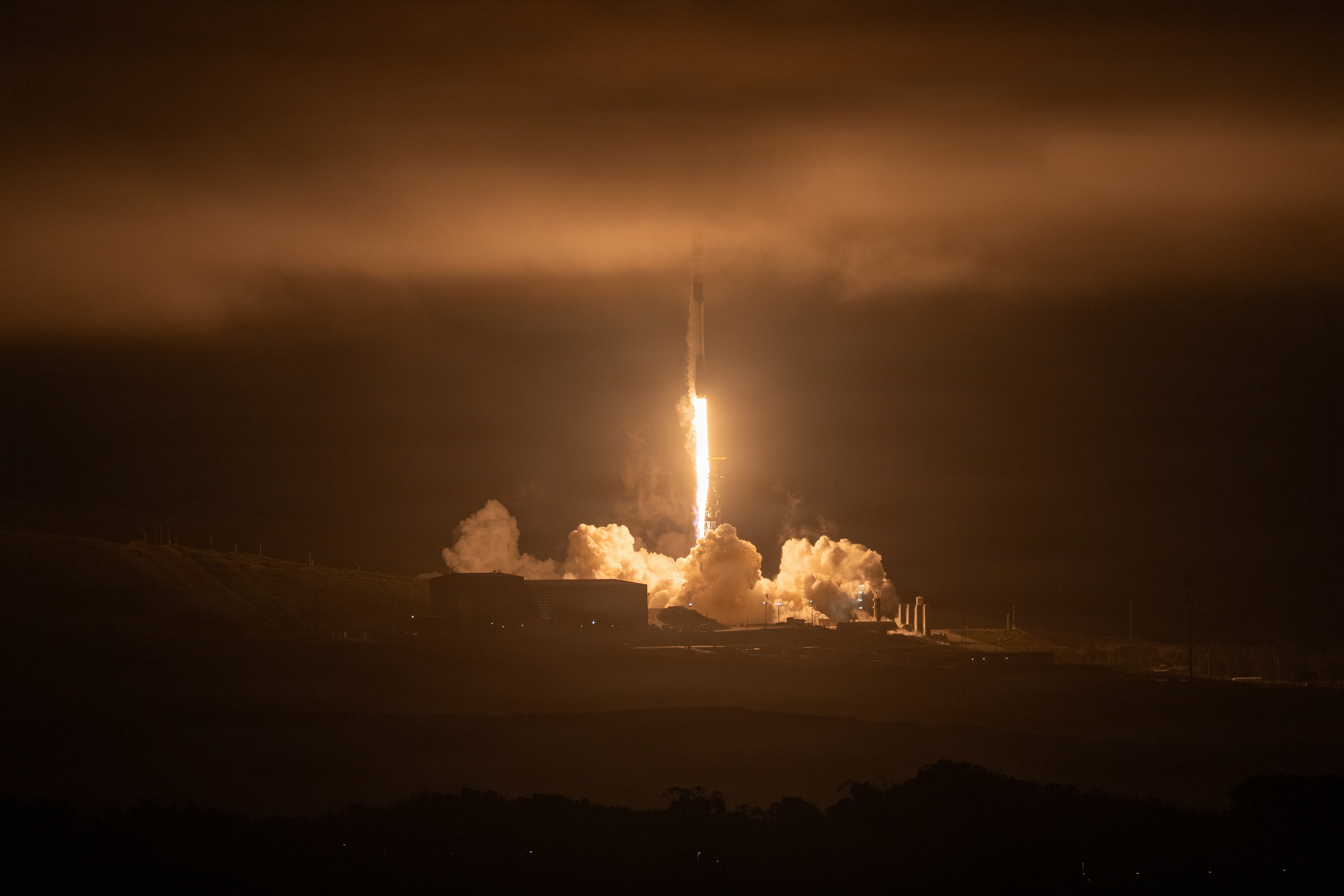
Launch of Transporter-17

== See also ==
- List of European Space Agency programmes and missions
- List of ESA CubeSats
