= TechDemoSat-1 =

European technology demonstration satellite

- Mission type: Technology demonstration
- Operator: UKSA, ESA
- COSPAR ID: 2014-037H
- SATCAT no.: 40076

Spacecraft properties
- Bus: SSTL-150
- Manufacturer: Surrey Satellite Technology
- Launch mass: 157 kg
- Dimensions: 77 cm x 50 cm x 90 cm

Start of mission
- Launch date: 8 July 2014, 15:58:28 UTC
- Rocket: Soyuz-2-1b Fregat
- Launch site: Baikonur Cosmodrome Site 31

End of mission
- Declared: 31 May 2019

Orbital parameters
- Reference system: Geocentric
- Regime: Sun-synchronous near-circular
- Altitude: 625 km
- Inclination: 98.36 deg
- Period: 97 minutes

TechDemoSat-1 was a joint UKSA-ESA technology demonstration satellite mission launched in 2014. The satellite carried eight experimental payloads provided by UK space industry and academic institutions. Among the new technologies demonstrated by the satellite was GNSS reflectometry (by SSTL) using satellite navigation signals reflected from the sea surface for measuring sea ice cover, ocean surface wind, and sea state. The mission ended in 2019 after the satellite successfully deployed an experimentral de-orbit drag sail (by Cranfield University) designed to increase the spacecraft's rate of orbital decay.

== See also ==
- List of European Space Agency programmes and missions
- HydroGNSS
- CYGNSS
- LUCID
