= Draco (space mission) =

European space reentry experiment

- Mission type: Space sustainability
- Operator: ESA

Spacecraft properties
- Manufacturer: Deimos Space

Start of mission
- Launch date: 2027 (planned)

Orbital parameters
- Reference system: Geocentric
- Altitude: < 100 km
- ESA insignia Space Safety Programme

Draco (Destructive Reentry Assessment Container Object) is a future spaceflight experiment under development by the European Space Agency (ESA) for launch in 2027. Draco will use a small space capsule to monitor the breakup process of a satellite reentering Earth atmosphere. The project, part of ESA's Space Safety Programme, aims to help the agency's space sustainability-related plans to build more "demisable" satellites that disintegrate entirely during reentry without generating space debris, limiting the environmental impact of spaceflight.

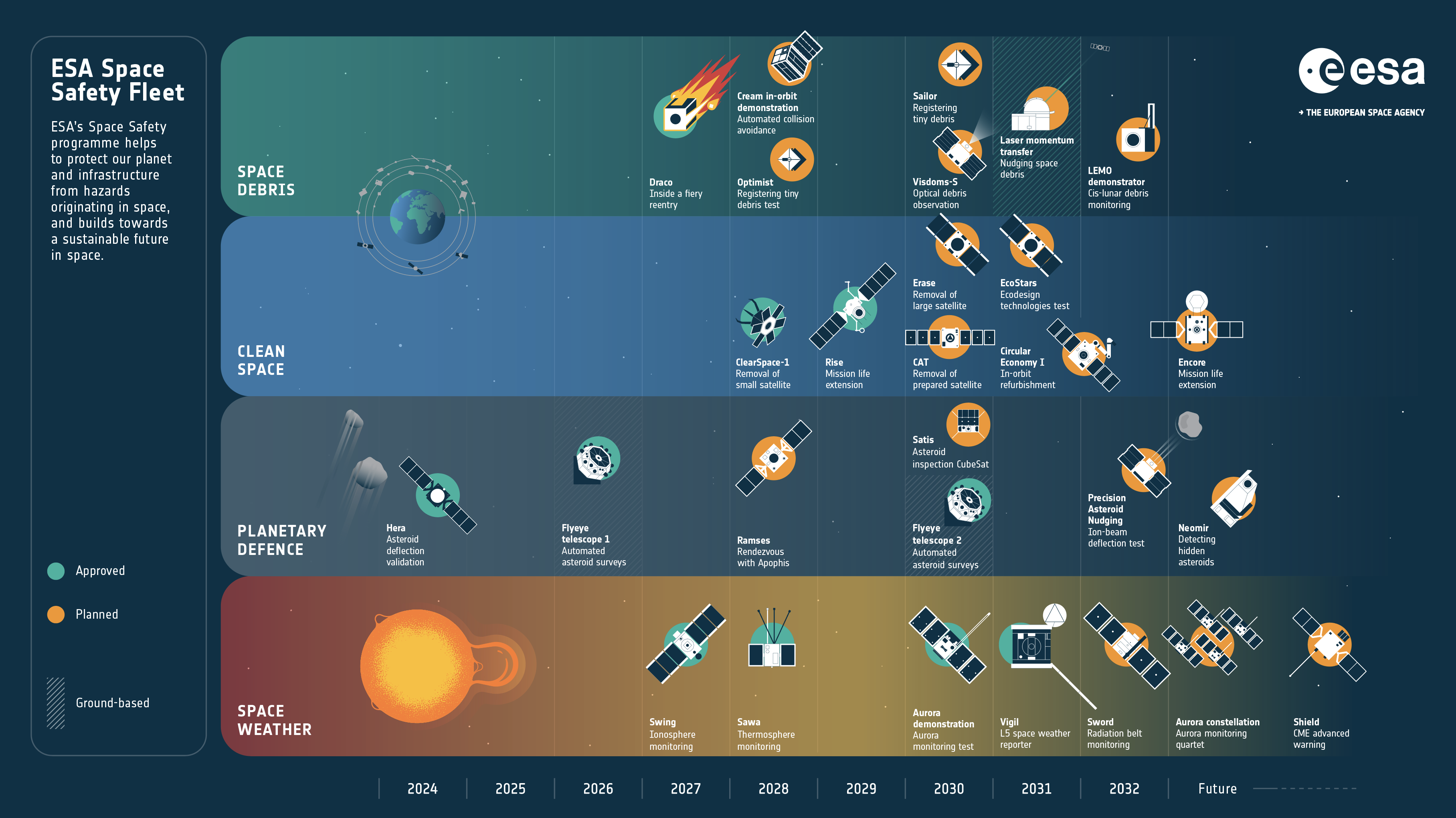
Proposed ESA Space Safety Fleet

== Team ==
The mission's project manager at ESA is Stijn Lemmens. The project manager at VKI is Amandine Denis and the technical lead at VKI is Bernd Helber.

== Spacecraft ==
The 150 to 200 kg Draco satellite, with no propulsion of its own, will be placed into a very low Earth orbit below 100 km of altitude for a rapid uncontrolled reentry within 12 hours. The process of its demise will be monitored by 200 sensors and 4 cameras sending their data to a 40 cm space capsule designed to survive the reentry and transmit all the data during its parachute descent towards ocean landing. The capsule heat shield, developed and tested at the von Karman Institute for Fluid Dynamics (VKI), is made from Portuguese cork.

== History ==
In September 2024, the Spanish company Deimos (later Indra Group) was awarded a EUR 17 million contract by ESA to develop the Draco capsule. This marked the first time Deimos acted as the prime contractor for a full ESA mission. In April 2026, Indra Group tested the capsule's parachute deployment systems in a drop test in Pamplona. The mission passed its Critical Design Review on 17 August 2026. This will be followed by manufacturing and integration of the flight hardware and a testing campaign including high-altitude balloon drop tests.

== See also ==
- List of European Space Agency programmes and missions
- List of space debris fall incidents
- QARMAN
