= LUCID =

Cosmic ray detector

- Mission type: Cosmic ray detection
- Operator: Simon Langton Grammar School for Boys
- Website: The Langton Star Centre

Spacecraft properties
- Manufacturer: Surrey Satellite Technology Ltd
Instruments
- 3: Timepix chips
- 1: Neutron-ready Timepix chip

LUCID (Langton Ultimate Cosmic ray Intensity Detector) is a cosmic ray detector built by Surrey Satellite Technology Ltd and designed at Simon Langton Grammar School for Boys, in Canterbury, England. Its main purpose is to monitor cosmic rays using technology developed by CERN, and will help predict the occurrence of solar flares (proton storms) which disrupt artificial satellites. LUCID was launched on 8 July 2014 at Baikonur, Kazakhstan as an instrument of the satellite TechDemoSat-1, which was carried into space by a Soyuz-2 rocket.
