= Corvus-IOV =

Czech technology demonstration satellite

- Mission type: Space domain awareness technology demonstration
- Website: spacemanic.com/missions/corvus-iov-cubesat-mission

Spacecraft properties
- Spacecraft type: 6U CubeSat
- Bus: Corvus
- Manufacturer: (Czech Republic) Spacemanic

Start of mission
- Launch date: 2027 (planned)
- Rocket: Falcon 9

Corvus-IOV is a future Czech technology demonstration satellite under development by the Brno-based company Spacemanic with the support of the European Space Agency's Pioneer Partnership Project. Its goal is to validate the company's Corvus nanosatellite platform, named after the constellation Corvus, designed to support operational CubeSat missions for Earth observation, communications, space domain awareness, and other applications. The 6U CubeSat-type satellite will include an optical payload for monitoring space debris. The satellite is expected to launch in mid-2027 on Falcon 9's mission Transporter-21.

== See also ==
- List of Czech satellites
- List of ESA CubeSats
