= Simon Langton Grammar School for Boys =

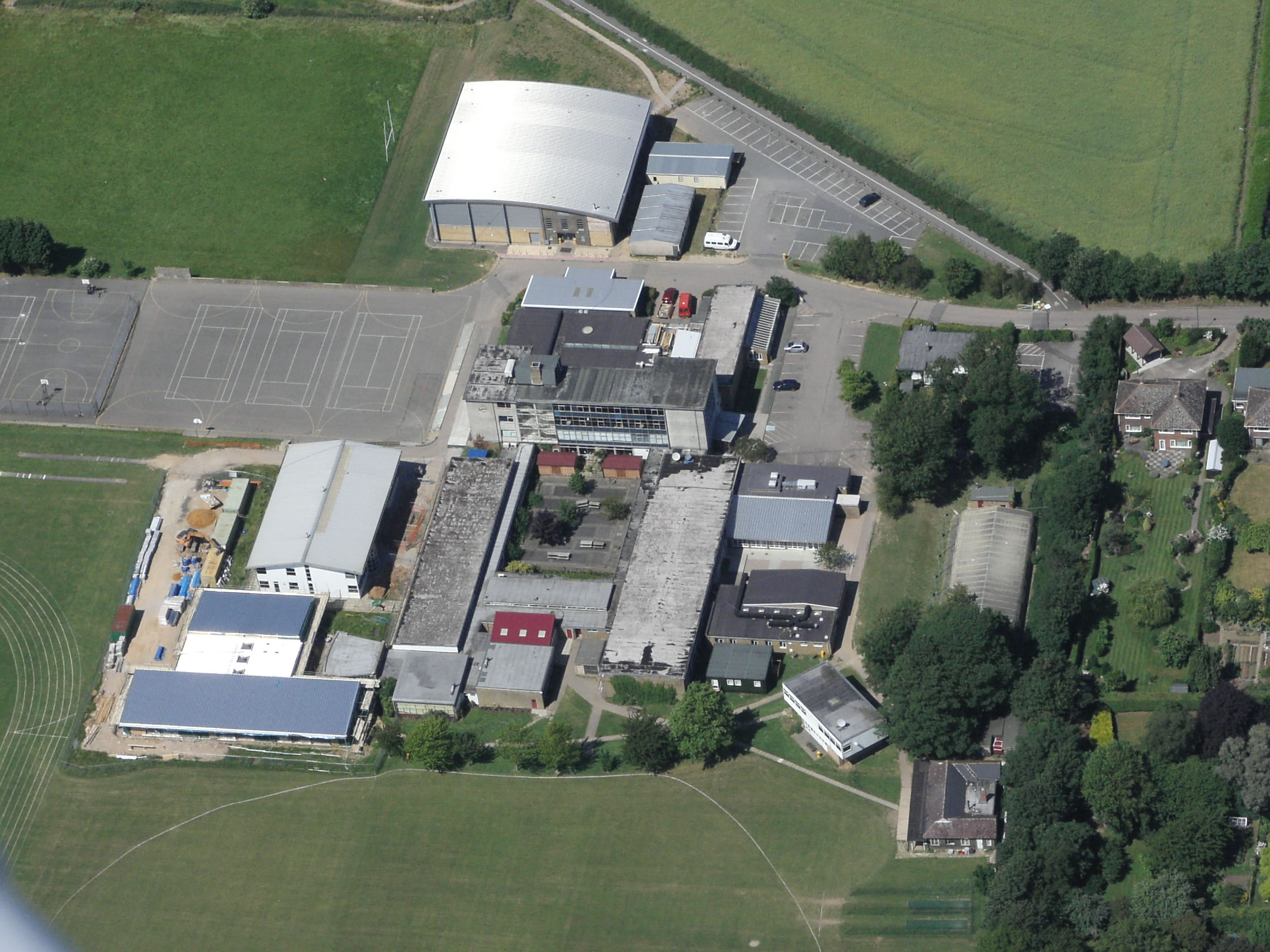
- Aerial view of the school in 2006

Location
- Langton Lane, Nackington Road; Canterbury, Kent, CT4 7AS; England; 51°15′40″N 1°05′02″E

Information
- Other names: The Langton Grammar School for Boys; The Langton
- Type: Foundation grammar school
- Motto: Latin: Meliora Sequamur (May we follow better things)
- Established: 1881; 145 years ago
- Sister school: Simon Langton Girls' Grammar School
- Local authority: Kent County Council
- Department for Education URN: 118884 Tables
- Ofsted: Reports
- Head of school: Ken Moffat
- Gender: Boys
- Age range: 11–18
- Enrolment: 1,091 (2019)
- Capacity: 947
- Houses: Burgess; Hardman; Mackenzie; Sharp; Young
- Colours: Maroon, gold, blue
- Publication: The Langtonian; The Langton News; The Langton Press
- Newspaper: The Langtonian
- Alumni: Old Langtonians
- Website: www.thelangton.org.uk

Simon Langton Grammar School for Boys (also known as The Langton Grammar School for Boys and simply referred to as The Langton) is an 11–18 foundation grammar school for boys and mixed sixth form in Canterbury, Kent, England. It was established in 1881.

== History ==
=== Foundation ===
The school building before its destruction in the Blitz

The school was founded along with its sister school, Simon Langton Girls' Grammar School, in 1881. It succeeded the Blue Coat Boys' School at the Poor Priest's Hospital in order to provide better education for the lower proportion of the Middle Class. The schools were originally called the Canterbury Middle Schools, but in order to dispel the impression that the schools were socially exclusive (the pair were often collectively known as the "middle class school"), they were renamed in 1887 after Simon Langton, Archdeacon of Canterbury (previously the Archbishop of York, for a short period in 1215), who, after his death in 1248, had left behind endowments to the Poor Priest's Hospital (which were later bequeathed to the Simon Langton schools).

The school was initially built on the site of what is now the Whitefriar's Shopping Centre in central Canterbury. The buildings were built of red brick, dressed with Bath stone, the construction of which cost approximately £3000, and the design was simple with little decoration.

=== Uniform and traditions ===
The school's coat of arms

The first piece of uniform was introduced in 1887; a straw hat with a black and yellow band and a separate cap for the winter months. However, by 1927 the black and yellow design was fairly widely replicated by other schools and so was replaced by a red, blue and gold blazer and hat with a coloured button on the crown to signify the wearer's House.

By 1900, the school had a range of traditions. On 24 May, Queen Victoria's birthday, Empire Day was celebrated by a parade and the raising of the Union Flag in the playground, a speech by the headmaster, and a holiday. At the end of each Christmas term, boys would put on an "Entertainment", and over the Christmas holidays they would be expected to read a classic set by the headmaster.

The first Annual Commemoration Service was held in July 1911, and has continued since, being interrupted only during wartime and the COVID-19 pandemic.

=== Relation to religion ===
The fact that the school could not be denominational was established as early as 1876 by George Blore, headmaster of The King's School, who reasoned that it was not part of the foundation of the Canterbury Cathedral and had neither the original grant of Elizabeth I nor the act of George II.

In a letter to The Guardian in 1906, the school was described by David Dorrity, who was the rector of St Ann's Church, Manchester, as a secondary school that "is made use of by all who can afford to pay the fees to the denominational schools".

He also appears to quote from the school's prospectus of the time:

Religious instruction is given, but is restricted to lessons from the Bible, and exemption from this instruction or from attendance at prayers may be claimed on written notice being given to the head master.

=== First and Second World Wars ===
Around four hundred boys from the Boys' School served in the Great War and 98 were killed in action. The school's house system is in memory of those Langtonians who gave their lives on the Western and Eastern fronts and further afield. During World War I, the Simon Langton schools were used by the military. The "New Wing" of Simon Langton Boys was adopted by the South East Mounted Rifles, who transformed the playground into a parade ground, and the playing fields were put to use by the army.

In the Second World War, the school was at first used as a reception centre for evacuees from London and the Medway towns; both staff and senior students helped to billet and feed the influx of children. The school was badly damaged in an air raid on the night of 1 June 1942 but continued on the Whitefriars site until it was relocated at its current site at Nackington in November 1959.

=== Recent developments ===
In 2011, the school became one of the first school sites to utilise the kinetic energy from the students' walking over pressure pads in a corridor with Pavegen systems technology that converts the energy from footsteps into electricity.

In November 2016, the right-wing political activist and former pupil of the school, Milo Yiannopoulos, was invited to speak to the school's Langton Liberal Arts Society about the election of Donald Trump as President of the United States. On the advice of the Department for Education's Counter Extremism Unit, the school withdrew the invitation, resulting in Yiannopoulos stating the school had given in to bullying. Joanna Williams, education editor at libertarian online magazine Spiked, wrote on The Spectator magazine website that "banning him sends the message to six-formers the way to deal with ideas they find politically distasteful 'is to howl in protest and insist they go away'".

In November 2017, the school was involved in a new controversy over the promotion of right wing politics after the development of a course specifically designed as "an antidote to the poison of political correctness" by teaching "the most beautifully disturbed and disturbing ideas". After receiving criticisms from pupils, parents and the MP for Canterbury, headteacher Ken Moffat responded by saying: "There is no rightwing agenda in the school".

In 2006, Simon Scarrow took up the newly-formed position of writer in residence at SLBS, a position he said he was "honoured to accept".

== Academic performance ==
The school achieved dual specialisms in science and mathematics. The CERN Courier described the school as "one of the most active in implementing innovative ways of teaching science in the UK".

== Langton Star Centre ==
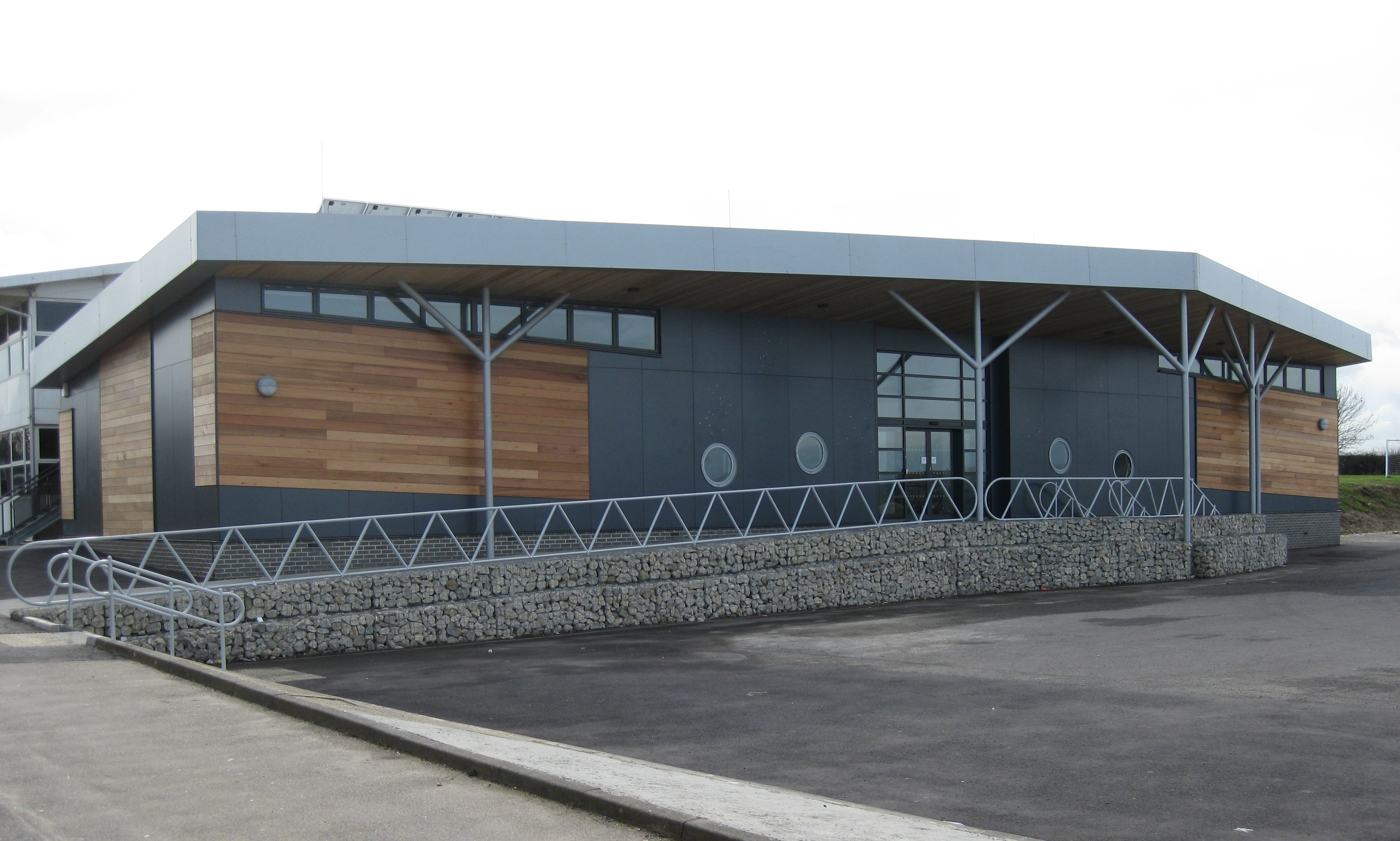
The Langton Star Centre facility

The Langton Star Centre is an organisation led by Tim Lesworth that supports research groups of students involved in scientific research, the principal aim of which is to "increase interest in science and engineering amongst post-16 school students such that they move on to study these subjects at university and take up careers in science and engineering." Projects run by the centre include the CERN@school project, the LUCID project (both in collaboration with CERN), the Imperial College plasma physics project, the Faulkes Telescope Project, and MBP^{2} (Myelin Basic Protein Project) with the help of the University of Kent in support of the Wellcome Trust.

Channel 4 News stated that its "boys have gone well beyond the curriculum to take part in cutting-edge scientific experiments; plasma physics, space satellites and medical research", and had "outwitted NASA" with the LUCID project.

== Notable alumni ==
The school has been linked with the music of the Canterbury scene as founding members of The Wilde Flowers, Caravan and Soft Machine were alumni. Ian MacDonald was quoted in 1975 to have described the school as "an exclusive, private establishment for the sons of local intellectuals and artists. Very free, emphatically geared to the uninhibited development of self-expression. A hot-bed to teenage avant-garderie."

- Peter Robert Bell, (1920 - 2009) Quain Professor of Botany, University College London
- Adrian Brett, flautist
- Tony Buzan, author and educational consultant
- Ross Clark, journalist and author
- Gideon Coe, radio DJ, presenter, sportscaster, voiceover artist and journalist
- Tony Coe, jazz musician
- Bernard Crossland, professor of engineering
- Archibald Cullen, bishop
- Michael Evans, bishop
- Steve Goldsmith, cricketer
- Nik Gowing, television journalist
- F. W. Jordan, physicist
- Raymond Kendall, law enforcement officer and former Interpol Secretary-General
- Freddie Laker, airline entrepreneur
- Denis Lemon, founder and editor of Gay News, prosecuted in Whitehouse v Lemon
- Joseph McManners, singer-songwriter, musician and actor
- Mark Padmore, tenor
- Trevor Pinnock, harpsichordist and conductor
- Adam Roberts (British writer), science-fiction writer
- Alec Rose, amateur sailor
- Ernest Walter Davie Western, Distinguished Service Order
- Paul Williams (Buddhist studies scholar), Professor, Uni. Bristol

== Headmasters ==
- G. H. Nelson (1881–1884)
- W. P. Mann (1884–1908)
- J. H. Sharp (1908–1925)
- L. W. Myers (1926–1954)
- D. C. H. Rieu (1955–1977)
- J. M.K. Harris (1977–2001)
- M. N. F. Baxter (2001–2017), executive headteacher (2017–2019)
- K. A. Moffat (2017–present)
