= GOMX-4B =

European technology demonstration CubeSat

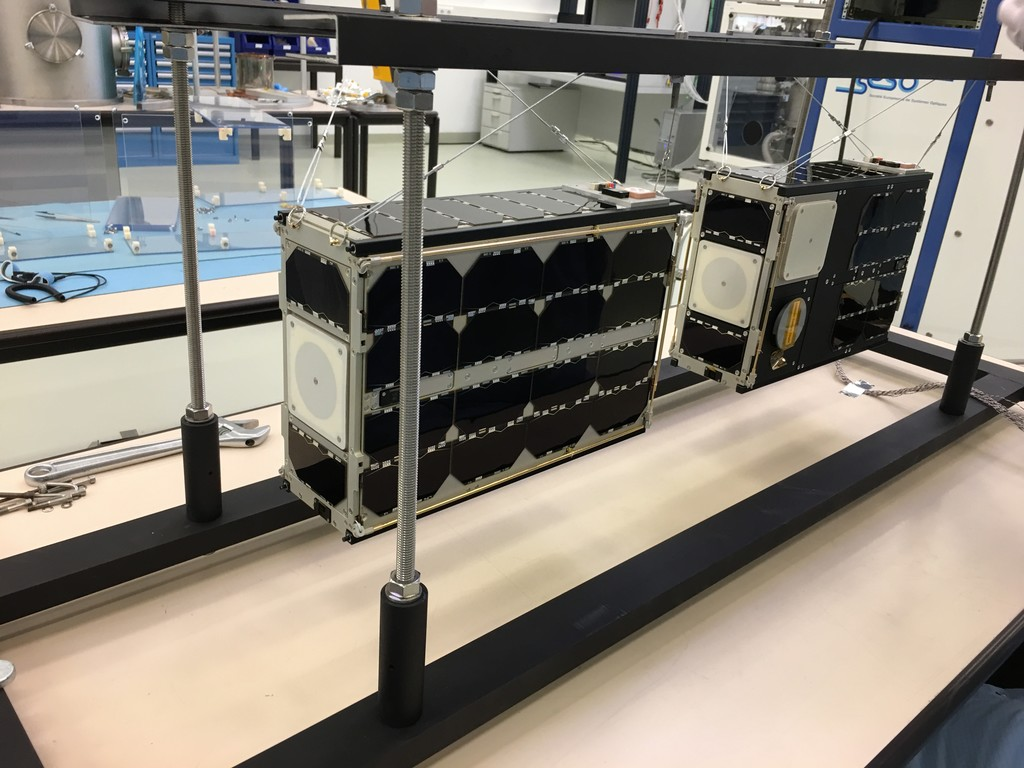
- GomX-4A (left) and GomX-4B (right)
- Mission type: Technology demonstration
- Operator: European Space Agency
- COSPAR ID: 2018-015E
- SATCAT no.: 43196

Spacecraft properties
- Spacecraft type: 6U CubeSat
- Manufacturer: (Denmark) GomSpace

Start of mission
- Launch date: 2 February 2018
- Rocket: Long March 2D
- Launch site: Jiuquan Satellite Launch Center

End of mission
- Declared: 2023
- Decay date: 9 October 2024

GOMX-4B was a technology demonstration CubeSat operated by the European Space Agency (ESA) and the Danish company GomSpace in low Earth orbit between 2018 and 2023. It successfully demonstrated various technologies related to small satellite constellations while flying in tandem with the GOMX-4A CubeSat, developed by GomSpace for the Danish Ministry of Defence's surveillance of the Arctic.

== See also ==
- List of European Space Agency programmes and missions
