= E.Inspector =

European technology demonstration cubesat

e.Inspector
- Mission type: Technology demonstration
- Operator: European Space Agency

Spacecraft properties
- Spacecraft type: 12U CubeSat
- Manufacturer: (Italy) Politecnico di Milano, Leonardo, LeafSpace, T4i

Start of mission
- Launch date: 2027 (planned)

Orbital parameters
- Reference system: Geocentric

The e.Inspector satellite is a future 12U CubeSat under development by the European Space Agency (ESA) for demonstrating on-orbit satellite servicing and space debris mitigation technologies. The spacecraft's goal is to perform a close-up inspection of a piece of space debris of European origin, possibly a Vega rocket's VESPA adapter or the PROBA-1 satellite, using visible and thermal imaging and to test multispectral image-based relative navigation. The spacecraft is being built by an Italian consortium of Politecnico di Milano, Leonardo, LeafSpace, and T4i under the ESA's General Support Technology Programme (GSTP). It is expected to launch in 2027.

== See also ==
- List of European Space Agency programmes and missions
