= QARMAN =

European technology demonstration CubeSat

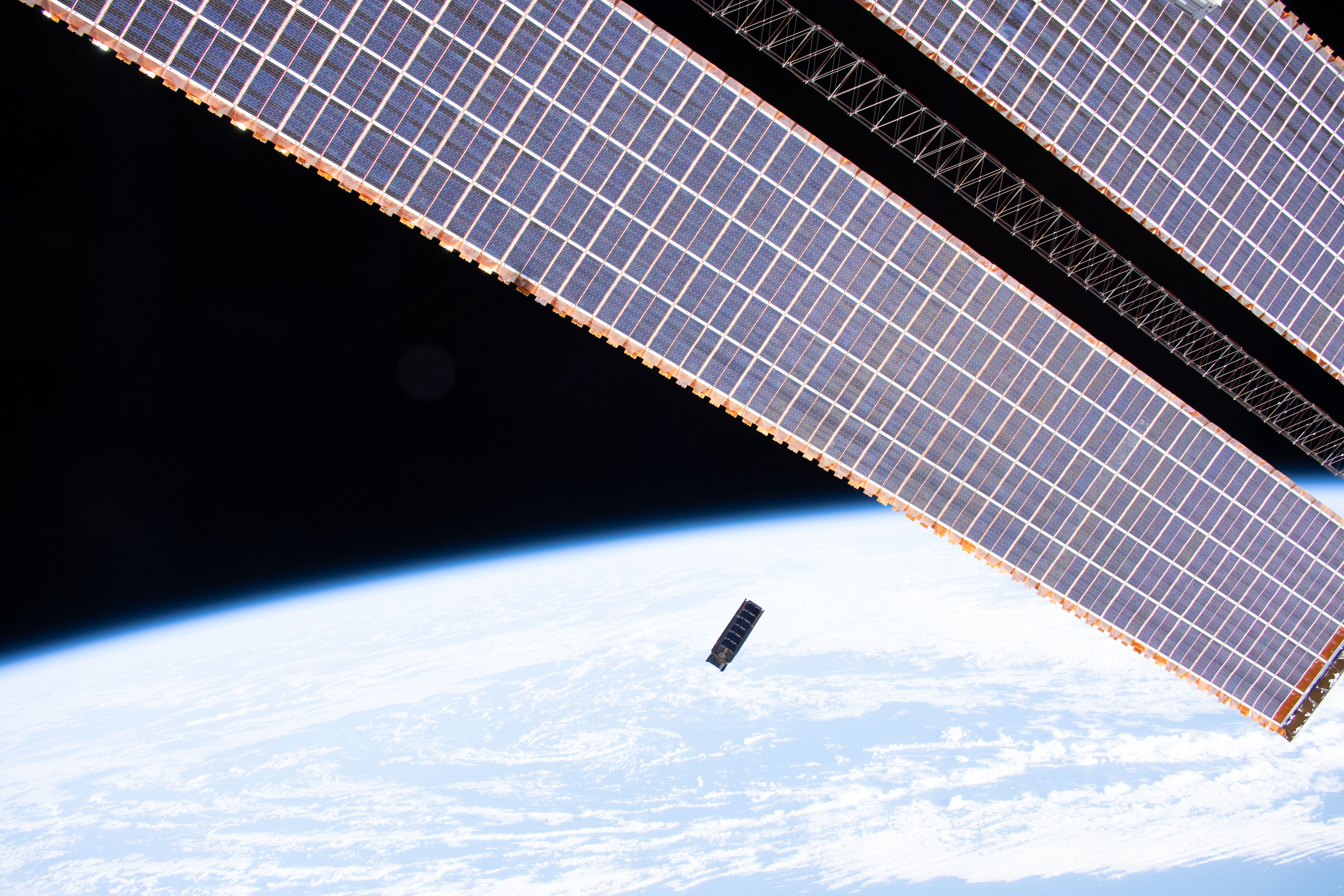
- Qarman CubeSat deployed from ISS
- Mission type: Technology demonstration
- Operator: European Space Agency
- COSPAR ID: 1998-067RG
- SATCAT no.: 45263

Spacecraft properties
- Spacecraft type: 3U CubeSat
- Manufacturer: (Belgium) von Karman Institute

Start of mission
- Launch date: 5 December 2019
- Rocket: Falcon 9
- Deployed from: ISS by Andrew R. Morgan via Kibō
- Deployment date: 19 February 2020

End of mission
- Last contact: 14 July 2020

QARMAN (QubeSat for Aerothermodynamic Research and Measurements on Ablation) was a technology demonstration CubeSat-type satellite developed by the European Space Agency (ESA) and the von Karman Institute for Fluid Dynamics in Belgium. Its mission was to test various atmospheric reentry-related technologies including an innovative cork-based ablative heat shield. QARMAN was launched aboard the SpaceX Dragon mission CRS-19 in December 2019 and later deployed from the ISS in February 2020. It was expected to slowly drift down over several months, its shuttlecock-like profile increasing its drag and stabilising its orientation, until finally it would reenter the atmosphere in July 2020, testing its heat shield and transmitting data via the Iridium satellites. However, the low solar activity during the beginning of Solar cycle 25 slowed the rate of its orbital decay. On 14 July 2020, the satellite stopped transmitting after experiencing increasing onboard temperatures.

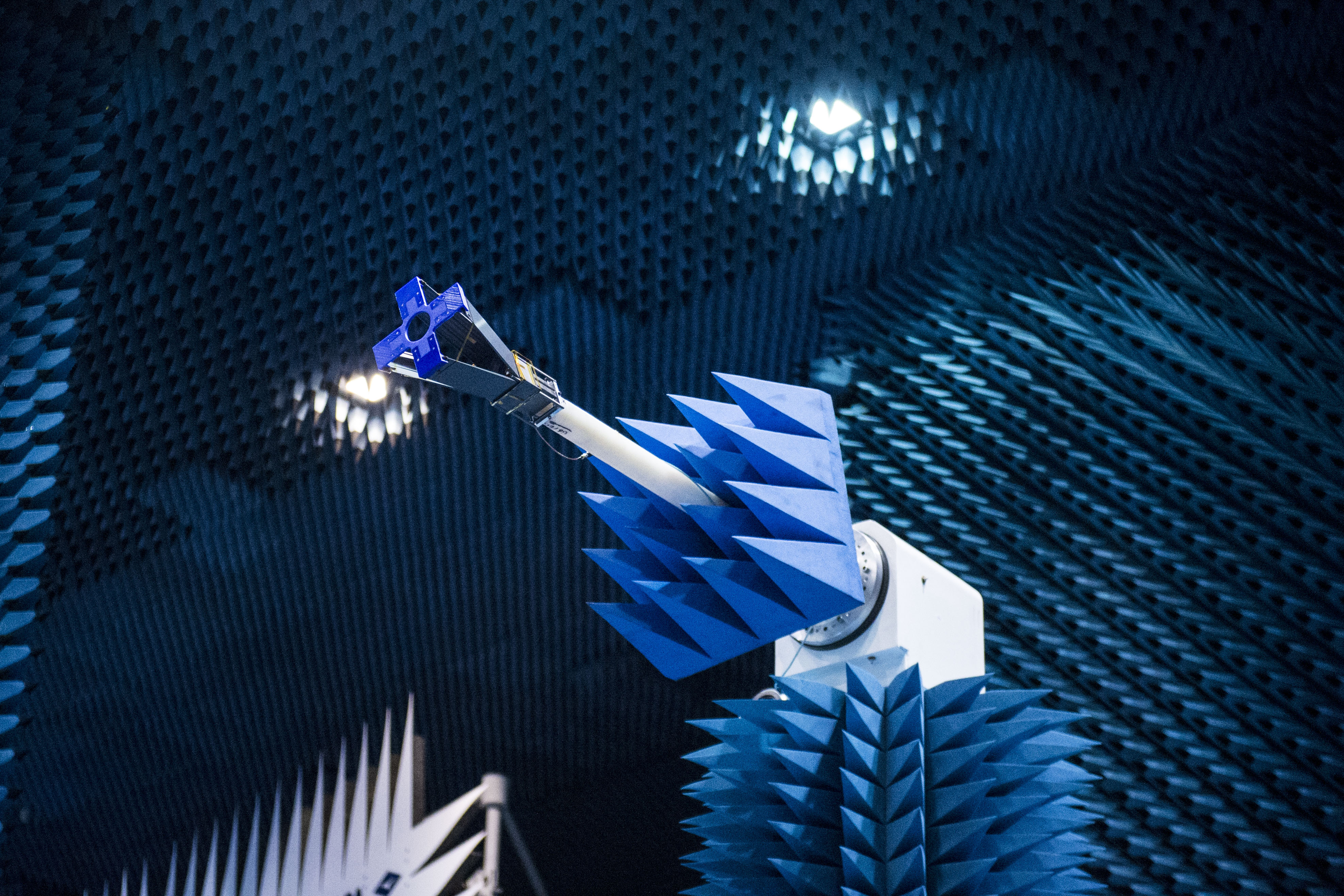
Qarman CubeSat in Hertz test chamber

== See also ==
- List of European Space Agency programmes and missions
- Draco
