= Hyperfield =

European Earth observation satellite constellation

- Manufacturer: (Finland) Kuva Space
- Country of origin: European Union; European Space Agency
- Applications: Earth observation

Specifications
- Regime: Sun-synchronous orbit

Production
- Launched: 2
- Operational: 2
- Maiden launch: 16 August 2024

Related spacecraft
- Launch vehicle: Falcon 9

Hyperfield is a European satellite constellation of Earth observation satellites developed by the Finnish company Kuva Space with the support of VTT Technical Research Centre of Finland and the European Space Agency's InCubed programme. The satellites provide near real-time hyperspectral imaging and perform onboard machine learning data processing. Hyperfield contributes data to the European Union's Copernicus Programme as a Copernicus Contributing Mission (CCM). The first satellite of the constellation, Hyperfield-1A, launched in August 2024 on a Falcon 9 rideshare flight.

== Satellites ==
Name	COSPAR ID	Satellite bus	Launch date	Launch vehicle	Flight
Hyperfield-1A	2024-149CY	6U CubeSat	16 August 2024	Falcon 9	Transporter 11
Hyperfield-1B	2025-135AA	6U CubeSat	23 June 2025	Falcon 9	Transporter 14
Hyperfield-2	TBA	16U CubeSat			
