= PICASSO (satellite) =

European CubeSat for atmospheric science

- Mission type: Atmospheric science
- Operator: ESA
- COSPAR ID: 2020-061K
- SATCAT no.: 46281

Spacecraft properties
- Spacecraft type: 3U CubeSat
- Manufacturer: Royal Belgian Institute for Space Aeronomy, VTT Technical Research Centre of Finland, AAC Clyde Space

Start of mission
- Launch date: 3 September, 2020
- Rocket: Vega
- Launch site: Guiana Space Centre

End of mission
- Decay date: 13 April 2024

PICASSO (Pico-Satellite for Atmospheric and Space Science Observations) was a CubeSat mission for technology demonstration in atmospheric science, operated in low Earth orbit by the European Space Agency (ESA) and the Belgian Institute for Space Aeronomy (BISA) between 2022 and 2024. Its goal was to demonstrate measurements of ozone distribution in the stratosphere, temperature profile up to the mesosphere, and electron density in the ionosphere using a low-cost small satellite. Its primary instrument was VISION, a hyper-spectral imager for observing the Earth's atmospheric limb during orbital Sun occultation. The other instrument was SLP, a multi-needle Langmuir probe.

== See also ==
- List of European Space Agency programmes and missions
