= TALISMAN (satellite) =

European methane monitoring satellite

- Operator: European Space Agency

Spacecraft properties
- Spacecraft type: 16U CubeSat
- Manufacturer: (Spain) Satlantis

Start of mission
- Launch date: 2027 (planned)

TALISMAN (liquid crysTAL polarimetry-based earth observation mISsion for MethANe detection) is an Earth observation satellite for methane emissions monitoring, which is being developed by the Spanish company Satlantis with the support of the National Institute for Aerospace Technology and the European Space Agency's InCubed programme. The satellite will perform in-orbit validation of a short-wave infrared optical instrument coupled with a liquid crystal polarimeter for point-source methane detection in context of climate change mitigation. The 16U CubeSat-type small satellite is expected to launch in 2027.

== See also ==
- List of European Space Agency programmes and missions
