= GNSS reflectometry =

Earth observation technology

GNSS-R system diagram

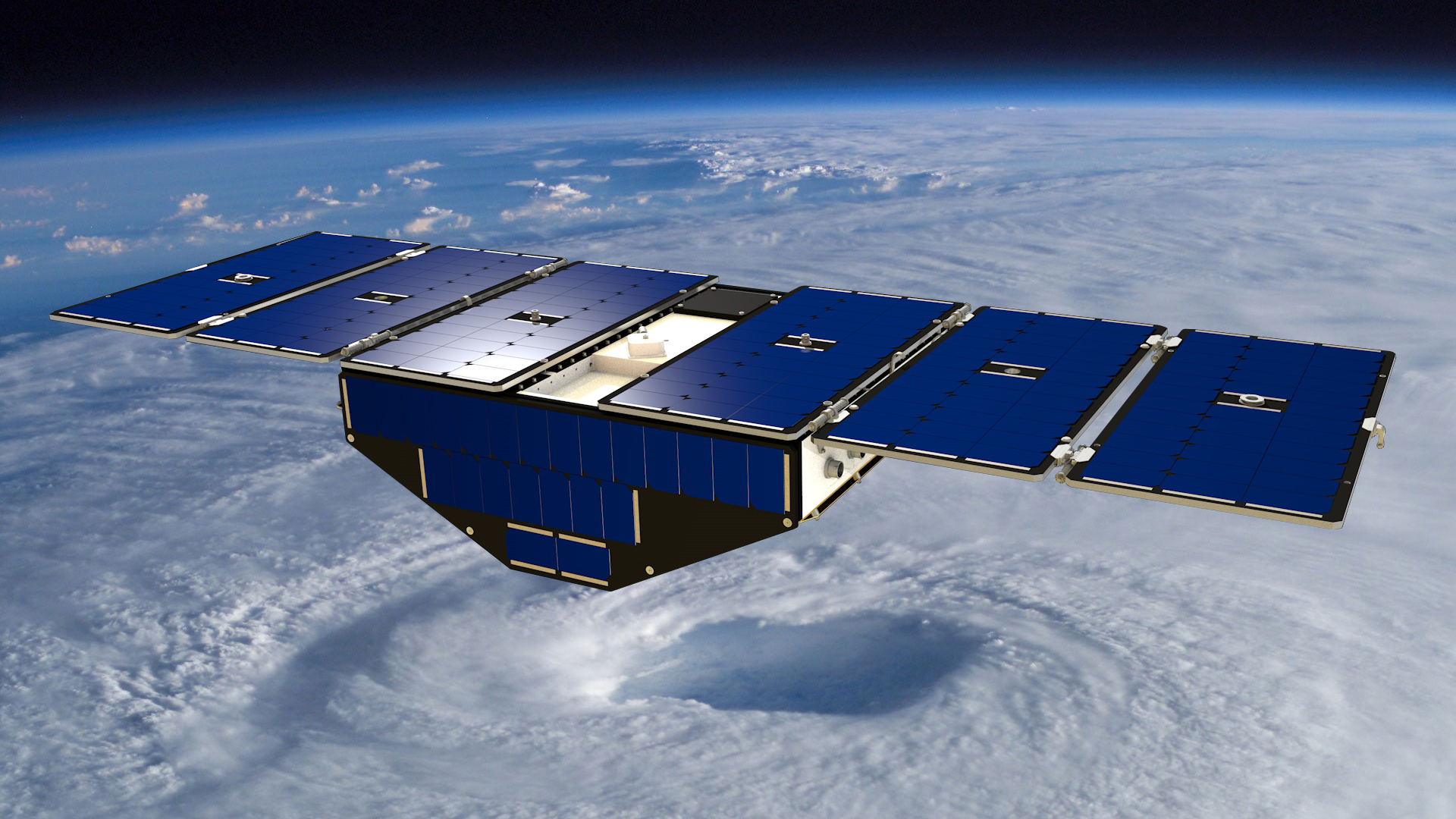
CYGNSS concept art

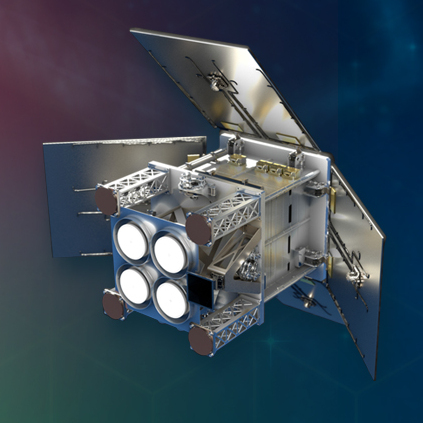
HydroGNSS concept art

GNSS reflectometry (or GNSS-R) involves making measurements from the reflections from the Earth of navigation signals from Global Navigation Satellite Systems such as GPS. The idea of using reflected GNSS signals for earth observation was first proposed in 1993 by Martin-Neira. It was also investigated by researchers at NASA Langley Research Center and is also known as GPS reflectometry. Research applications of space-based GNSS-R are focused in altimetry, oceanography (wave height and wind speed), cryosphere monitoring, and soil moisture monitoring.

== Principles ==
GNSS reflectometry is passive sensing that takes advantage of and relies on multiple active sources - with the satellites generating the navigation signals. For this, the GNSS receiver measures the signal delay from the satellite (the pseudorange measurement) and the rate of change of the range between satellite and observer (the Doppler measurement). The surface area of the reflected GNSS signal also provides the two parameters time delay and frequency change. As a result, the Delay Doppler Map (DDM) can be obtained as GNSS-R observable. The shape and power distribution of the signal within the DDM is dictated by two reflecting surface conditions: its dielectric properties and its roughness state. Further derivation of geophysical information rely on these measurements.

GNSS reflectometry is a bi-static radar, where transmitter and receiver are separated by a significant distance. Since in GNSS reflectometry one receiver simultaneously can track multiple transmitters (i.e. GNSS satellites), the system also has the nature of multi-static radar. The receiver of the reflected GNSS signal can be of different kinds: Ground stations, ship measurements, airplanes or satellites, like the UK-DMC satellite, part of the Disaster Monitoring Constellation built by Surrey Satellite Technology Ltd. It carried a secondary reflectometry payload that has demonstrated the feasibility of receiving and measuring GPS signals reflected from the surface of the Earth's oceans from its track in low Earth orbit to determine wave motion and windspeed.

== Space missions ==
- CYGNSS, satellite constellation by NASA using GNSS-R for improving hurricane forecasting, launched in 2016
- TechDemoSat-1, technology demonstration small satellite by ESA, launched in 2019
- PRETTY, technology demonstration CubeSat by ESA measuring sea state, sea ice, and ocean currents, launched in 2023
- HydroGNSS, 2 identical small satellites by ESA for monitoring Essential Climate Variables related to the hydrological cycle, launched in November 2025

== GNSS Interferometric Reflectometry ==
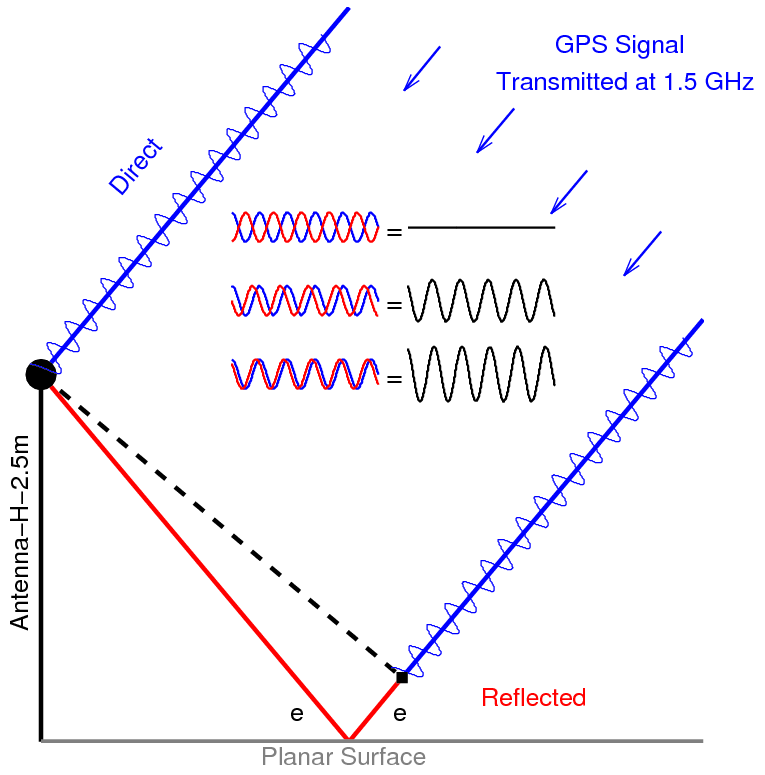
Geometry of GNSS-IR

GNSS Interferometric Reflectometry (or GNSS-IR) is a specialized case of GNSS-R. Here the receiving instrument is on the surface of the Earth. In this technique the interference of the direct and reflected signals is used rather than a Delay Doppler Map or measuring the two signals separately. In the example shown, a GNSS antenna is ~2.5 meters above a planar surface. Both direct (blue) and reflected (red) GNSS signals are shown. As a GNSS satellite rises or sets, the elevation angle changes; the direct and reflected signals will generate an interference pattern. The frequency of this interference pattern can be used to extract the height of the antenna above the planar surface, the reflector height. Changes in reflector height can be directly used to measure water surfaces and the height of snow.
