= CubeSpec =

Future European astronomy CubeSat

- Mission type: Asteroseismology, technology demonstration
- Operator: European Space Agency
- Website: fys.kuleuven.be/ster/instruments/cubespec

Spacecraft properties
- Spacecraft type: 12U CubeSat
- Manufacturer: (Belgium) KU Leuven

Start of mission
- Launch date: 2027 (planned)

Orbital parameters
- Reference system: Geocentric
- Regime: Sun-synchronous
- Altitude: 500 km

CubeSpec is a future astronomy CubeSat mission under development by the European Space Agency (ESA) and KU Leuven. Its objective is to test a low-cost small satellite platform for long-term spectroscopic monitoring of stars from space on the specific case of asteroseismology of massive stars. Similar satellites can be used for many astronomical applications including characterization of exoplanets. CubeSpec is scheduled to launch in mid-2027.

== Technology ==
CubeSpec is testing an easily reconfigurable platform with the potential of observing in a broad range of wavelengths (in visible light and UV) and resolutions. To achieve the extreme pointing accuracy needed for the observations, the satellite is equipped with a High-Precision Pointing Platform (HPPP) which uses a rapidly tilting fine steering mirror to redirect starlight towards the spectrograph.

== See also ==
- List of European Space Agency programmes and missions
- 2027 in spaceflight
