= MicroHETsat =

European technology demonstration satellite

- Mission type: Technology demonstration
- Operator: European Space Agency
- COSPAR ID: 2023-185E
- SATCAT no.: 58466

Spacecraft properties
- Manufacturer: (Italy) SITAEL

Start of mission
- Launch date: 1 December 2023, 18:19 UTC
- Rocket: Falcon 9
- Launch site: Va SLC-4E
- Contractor: SpaceX

MicroHETsat, or μHETsat, is a technology demonstration satellite developed by the European Space Agency (ESA) and the Italian Space Agency (ASI) for testing Hall Effect Thrusters on a microsatellite platform. The satellite was built by the Italian company SITAEL. Its development was supported by ESA's optional General Support Technology Programme (GSTP). Originally, it was expected to launch on the LauncherOne or Vega rocket, but was eventually launched on a Falcon 9 in December 2023.

== See also ==
- List of European Space Agency programmes and missions
