= VULCAIN =

European Earth observation satellite mission

- Mission type: Volcanology, technology demonstration
- Operator: European Space Agency; Italian Space Agency

Spacecraft properties
- Spacecraft type: 2x 12U CubeSat
- Manufacturer: (Italy) Politecnico di Milano

Start of mission
- Launch date: 2027 (planned)

Orbital parameters
- Reference system: Geocentric
- Altitude: 400 km

VULCAIN is a future formation flying Earth observation satellite mission under development jointly by the European Space Agency (ESA) and the Italian Space Agency (ASI) dedicated to stereoscopic imaging of volcanoes and coastal areas. The two identical 12U CubeSats will be equipped with thermal and visible imaging systems and will keep separation of 300 km at the low orbital altitude of around 400 km using low-thrust electric propulsion. The mission's primary goal is to investigate the possibility of predicting volcanic events and their effects through space-based detection of thermal phenomena. Its development, coordinated by the Polytechnic of Milan, is supported by ESA's optional General Support Technology Programme (GSTP). The mission's launch is expected in 2027.

== See also ==
- List of European Space Agency programmes and missions
