= OroraTech =

German aerospace company

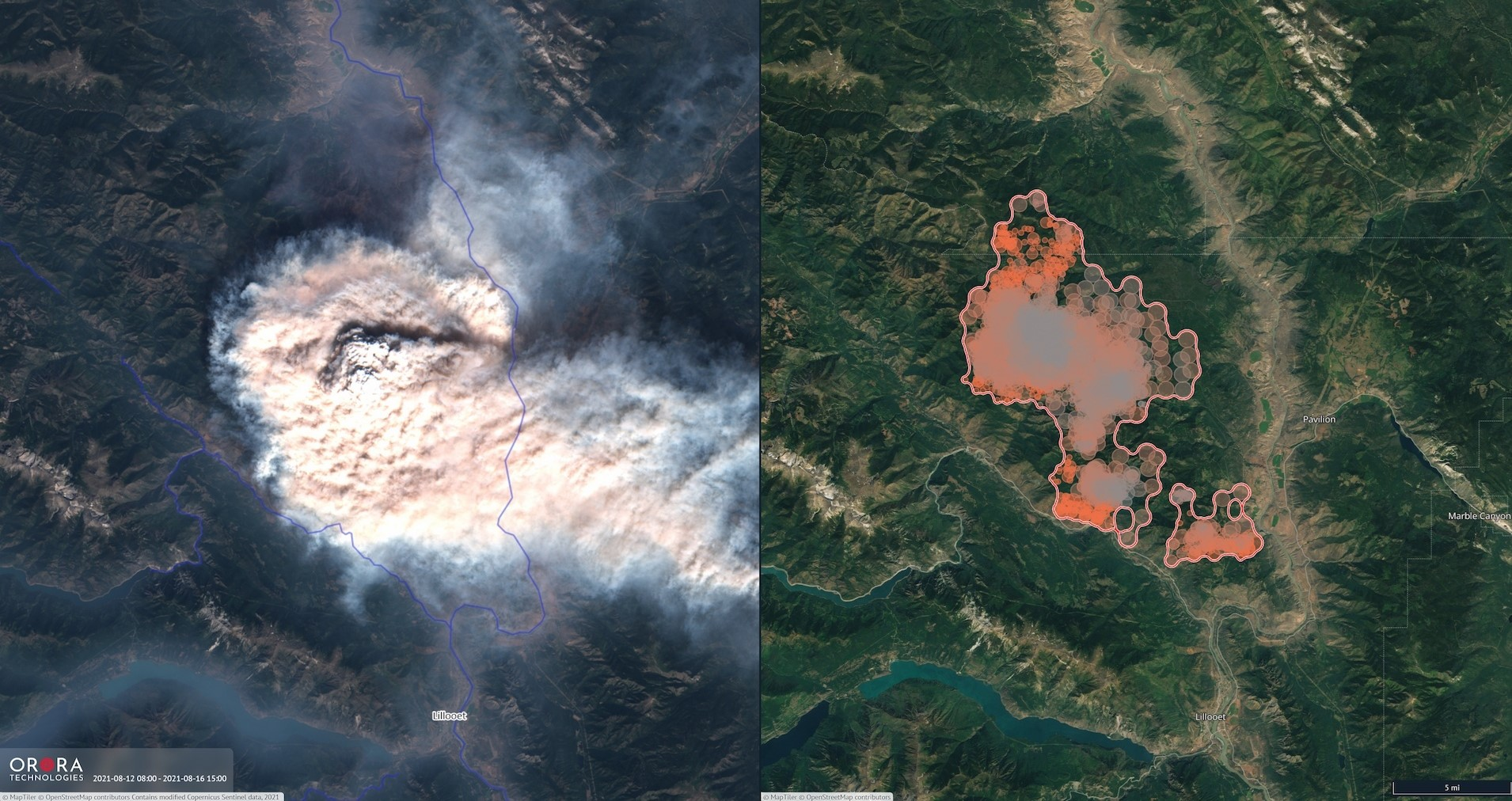
Wildfire detection in British Columbia

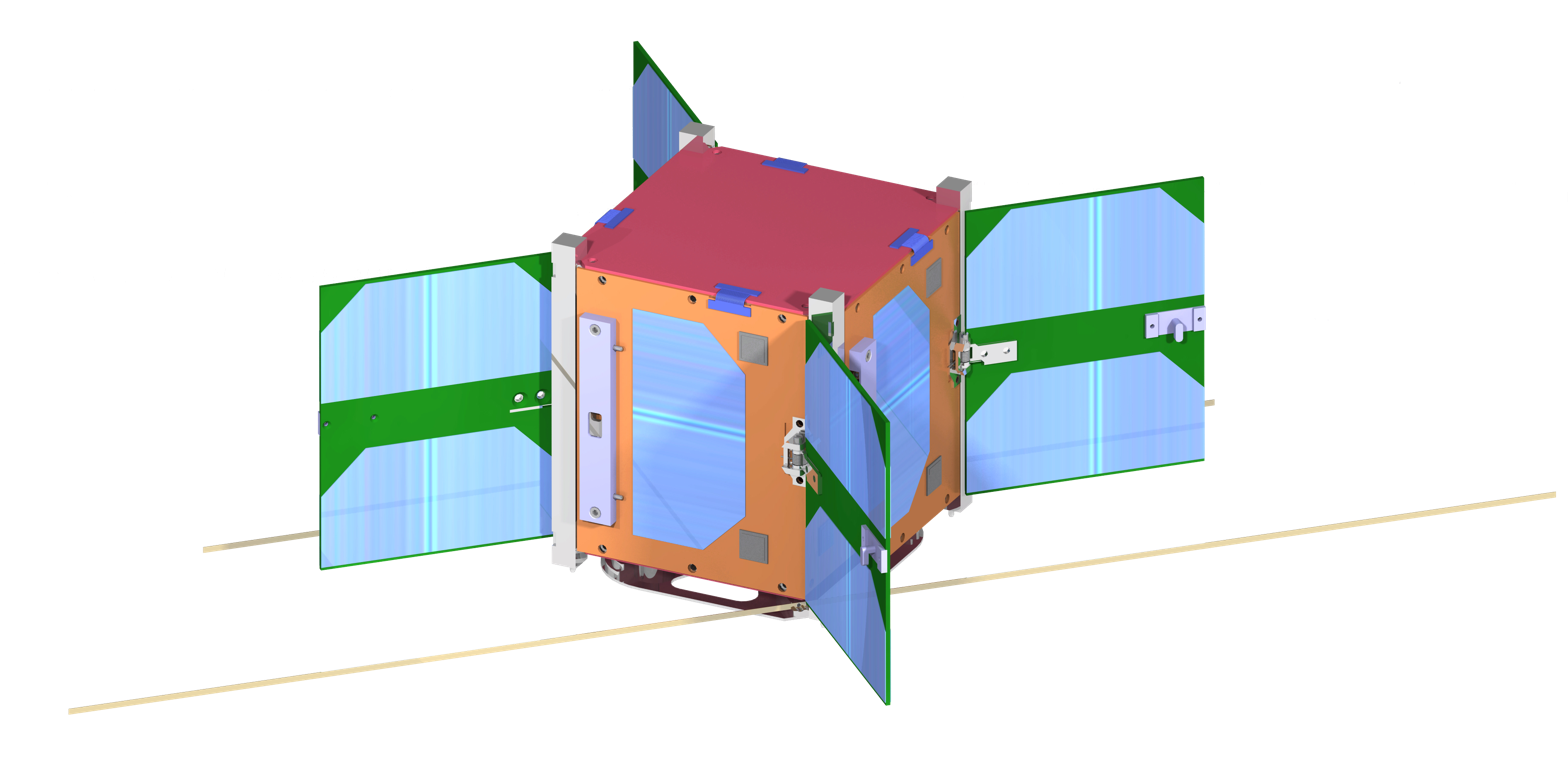
Early rendering of the MOVE-II satellite

OroraTech is a German aerospace start-up company providing wildfire monitoring with a network of around 35 thermal imaging satellites. It was founded in 2018 as a university spin-off at the Technical University of Munich (TUM). The headquarters are in Munich, Germany. In June 2023, OroraTech joined the Copernicus Programme of the European Union delivered by the European Space Agency.

== History ==
OroraTech's key idea had been developed during the MOVE-II CubeSat project and WARR at the Technical University of Munich (TUM). Starting as a spin-off in January 2017, the company was incorporated as Orbital Oracle Technologies GmbH (short: OroraTech) in September 2018. Since OroraTech's technology is based on academic research at the TUM, TUM professors Ulrich Walter, a former astronaut, and Alexander W. Koch act as advisors to the company.

=== Funding ===
In May 2025, OroraTech announced the completion of its Series B funding round, raising a total of €37 million. The round was led by BNP Paribas Solar Impulse Venture Fund and Rabo Ventures. At the time of the funding announcement, OroraTech had 10 satellites in orbit.

=== FOREST Satellite Development and ESA Partnership ===
OroraTech's FOREST satellite constellation was developed in partnership with the European Space Agency and the German Aerospace Center (DLR). FOREST-1 and FOREST-2 were launched in 2023 and 2024 respectively. On January 29, 2026, the ESA confirmed that FOREST-2 achieved all quality targets, including 2% absolute radiometric accuracy in the LWIR2 band, meeting the same standards applied to Copernicus Sentinel missions. FOREST-3, OroraTech's first fully internally developed satellite mission, completed its final mission review with ESA and DLR in May 2026 after 15 months in orbit, with the full deliverable package accepted.

== Technology ==
Wildfire detection using infrared sensors in space had been proposed as a technology since the 1990s. Technological advances, notably sunk space launch cost, enabled non-state actors to enter the market. As such, OroraTech operates a software platform for the detection and monitoring of wildfires based on measuring thermal-infrared radiation from space. The company is using data from existing satellites and develops their own constellation of 3-U CubeSats with thermal-infrared cameras to further improve temporal and spatial resolution of fire detection.

Their Wildfire Solution software platform generates various overlays on base maps to visualize fire risk and fire detections. At the current stage, the platform uses data over twelve satellites in polar and geostationary orbits, including such by NASA, ESA, and EUMETSAT. In early 2020, the platform had around 100 active users.

== Field applications ==
The technology is used by Wildfire Services in British Columbia (Canada) and New South Wales (Australia) for wildfire detection and wildfire suppression. International media used images from OroraTech's wildfire service for coverage of the 2020 wildfire season in California, Oregon, British Columbia, and Siberia.

== FOREST constellation ==
The satellite technology is based on research from the MOVE-II project at the Chair of Astronautics (LRT) at the TUM. During the project, a 1-Unit CubeSat was launched with SpaceX in December 2018.

=== FOREST-1 and FOREST-2 ===
OroraTech's first nanosatellite FOREST-1, based on the original CubeSat, was developed to reach 10 cm x 10 cm x 34 cm in size, weighing around 1.2 kg, and it was launched on 13 January 2022 as part of SpaceX's Transporter-3 rideshare mission. The satellite features an uncooled thermal-infrared imager for space applications, and GPU-accelerated on-orbit processing to reduce downlink latency and bandwidth for quicker wildfire alert dissemination, making it particularly efficient in tackling the issue of detecting wildfires in late afternoon images. A second satellite FOREST-2, once again hosted on a Lemur-2 cubesat platform, was launched on 12 June 2023 on a Falcon 9 Block 5 rocket as part of SpaceX Transporter-8 rideshare mission.

=== FOREST-3 ===
FOREST-3 is an Earth observation satellite focused on wildfire detection, developed by OroraTech with support of the German Aerospace Center (DLR) and the European Space Agency (ESA). The 8U CubeSat is designed to provide multispectral thermal-infrared imaging of Earth surface during afternoon hours, when many wildfires ignite, but which are insufficiently covered by other infrared imaging satellites.

The development of FOREST-3 was funded by DLR via ESA's InCubed programme managed by the agency's ɸ-lab. The satellite was launched on 14 January 2025 on the Falcon 9 flight Transporter-12. FOREST-3 is OroraTech's first fully internally developed spacecraft and a precursor for a larger constellation of wildfire-detecting satellites planned by OroraTech.

=== FOREST-16, 17, 18, 19 ===
On 3 May 2026, four satellites (FOREST-16 to19) were launched for the EU-funded, ESA-coordinated Greek National Microsatellite Program of the Hellenic Space Center on Falcon 9's CAS500-2 rideshare mission. These satellites form the Hellenic Fire System, the country's first dedicated satellite constellation for wildfire detection and monitoring.

FOREST constellation satellites
Name	COSPAR ID	Satellite bus	Launch date	Launch vehicle	Launch site	Orbit	Note
FOREST-1 (Lemur-2 Rohovithsa)	2022-002BE	6U CubeSat (enlarged Lemur-2)	13 January 2022	Falcon 9	SLC-40	SSO	Decay: 3 August 2024
FOREST-2 (Lemur-2 Embrionovis)	2023-084AQ	6U CubeSat (enlarged Lemur-2)	12 June 2023	Falcon 9	SLC-4E	SSO	
FOREST-3	2025-009CB	8U CubeSat	14 January 2025, 19:09 UTC	Falcon 9	SLC-4E	SSO	Transporter-12
FOREST-16	2026-100AF	8U CubeSat	3 May 2026, 7:00 UTC	Falcon 9	SLC-40	SSO	Hellenic Fire System; operated by the Hellenic Space Center as part of the Greek National Microsatellite Program; launched on CAS500-2 rideshare mission.
FOREST-17	2026-100X	8U CubeSat	3 May 2026, 7:00 UTC	Falcon 9	SLC-40	SSO	Hellenic Fire System; operated by the Hellenic Space Center as part of the Greek National Microsatellite Program; launched on CAS500-2 rideshare mission.
FOREST-18	2026-100AD	8U CubeSat	3 May 2026, 7:00 UTC	Falcon 9	SLC-40	SSO	Hellenic Fire System; operated by the Hellenic Space Center as part of the Greek National Microsatellite Program; launched on CAS500-2 rideshare mission.
FOREST-19	2026-100AE	8U CubeSat	3 May 2026, 7:00 UTC	Falcon 9	SLC-40	SSO	Hellenic Fire System; operated by the Hellenic Space Center as part of the Greek National Microsatellite Program; launched on CAS500-2 rideshare mission.
FOREST-20 Araucaria	2026-227E		1 October 2026	Falcon 9	SLC-4E		Transporter-18

== Partnerships ==
OroraTech has established partnerships with major institutions and technology companies. Since June 2023, the company has been a thermal data supplier to the European Space Agency's Copernicus Emergency Management Service (CEMS). The FOREST satellite constellation was developed in collaboration with the German Aerospace Center (DLR) as part of ESA's Contributing Copernicus Missions programme. In January 2026, OroraTech partnered with Kepler Communications to deliver the world's first continuous thermal livestream of Earth using optical inter-satellite communications and on-orbit AI processing. In June 2026, OroraTech was selected for NASA's Commercial Smallsat Data Acquisition (CSDA) program, a multi-award procurement vehicle with a ceiling exceeding $476 million, making OroraTech's thermal intelligence available to NASA and the broader US Earth science community. The company also collaborates with TracPlus on integrated wildfire situational awareness.]

== Reception and Media Coverage ==
OroraTech has received extensive coverage from international media outlets and industry publications. Deutsche Welle, Germany's international broadcaster, published a multilingual feature in July 2026 on OroraTech's wildfire detection technology, noting that the Munich startup built a viable commercial service by complementing NASA and ESA public satellite data with proprietary thermal imaging for faster fire detection. The company was featured in Forbes as one of five venture-backed startups fighting wildfires. Major German broadcasters including ARD's investigative program Plusminus, Tagesschau, and Bayerischer Rundfunk have covered OroraTech's innovations. International television coverage includes NBC News, FOX40 Sacramento, and France's TF1 and Euronews. In July 2026, OroraTech was named to Geoawesome's Global Top 100 Geospatial Companies 2026.

In May 2025, OroraTech announced the completion of its Series B funding round, raising a total of €37 million. The round was led by BNP Paribas Solar Impulse Venture Fund and Rabo Ventures.

OroraTech's thermal satellite monitoring system has been deployed across multiple jurisdictions. In September 2025, Idaho became the first US state to sign a statewide wildfire detection partnership with the Idaho Department of Lands. In June 2026, Greece announced the Hellenic Fire System, the world's first national satellite system dedicated exclusively to wildfire detection, utilizing OroraTech's thermal constellation. In July 2026, the Aspen Fire Protection District in Colorado extended OroraTech satellite wildfire detection coverage to include Lincoln Creek Valley. OroraTech's satellite data has also been operationally deployed in British Columbia, Croatia, and Colombia for wildfire detection and emergency response.
