= Phi Lab =

ESA branch

Φ-lab
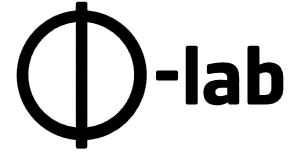
- Φ-lab logo
- Motto: Accelerate the future of Earth Observation
- Established: Jan 1st, 2018; 8 years ago
- Field of research: Space Technology, Artificial Intelligence, Quantum Computing, Earth Observation
- Director: Giuseppe Borghi
- Location: Frascati, Italy
- Website: ESA Φ-lab Website

The Φ-lab (Phi-lab) is the Earth Observation innovation lab at the European Space Agency (ESA). It has the mission of accelerating the future of Earth observation exploiting transformative innovation and commercialisation actions to strengthen European global competitiveness, by helping the earth observation researchers, talented innovator and entrepreneurs to adopt disruptive technologies and methods. It is currently working on artificial intelligence, foundation models, quantum computing, onboard artificial intelligence, and virtual reality.

The Φ-lab is also an investors in innovative space business via its InCubed co-funding programme providing rapid funding to innovative business ideas to exploit new Earth Observation markets. The Φ-lab acts as a hub between industry, academia and investors and maintain the Φ-lab community where people and talents can share ideas and needs.

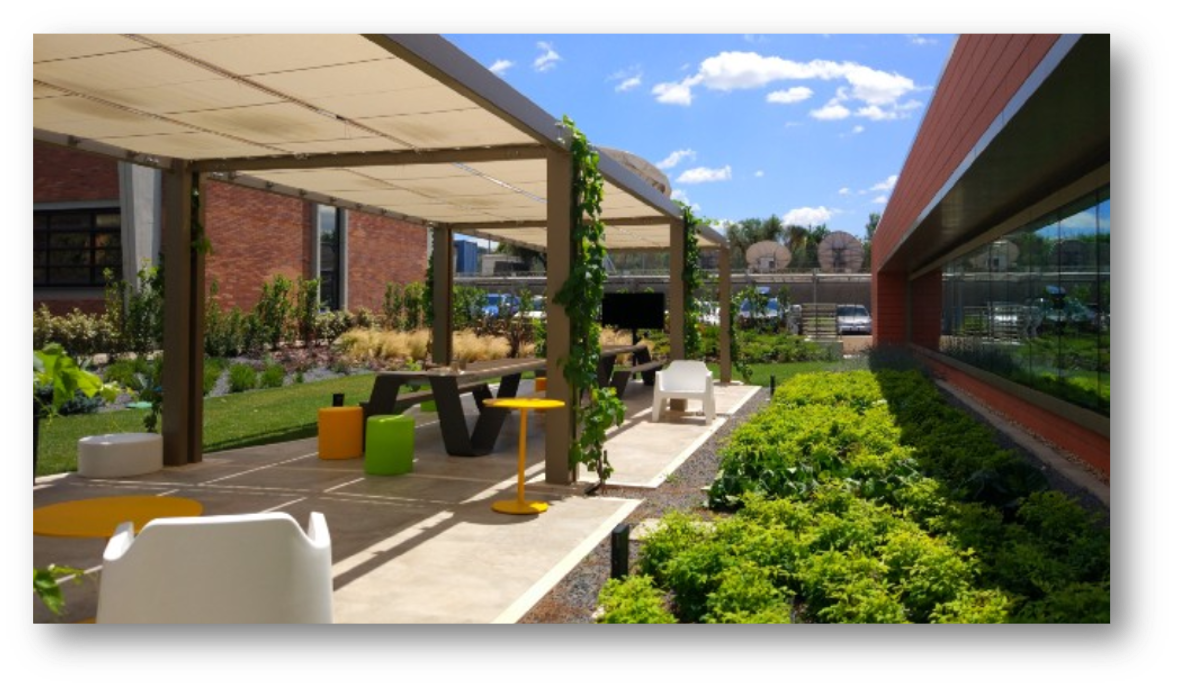
The Φ-lab garden where many meetings take place

The Φ-lab is a division of the ESA Earth Observation Programme developing future systems for earth observation. The Φ-lab brings experts from across the world to develop research on the relevance for Earth Observation of emerging technology topics including artificial intelligence, distributed ledgers and quantum computing. Representatives from industry, or academia can propose to work with Φ-lab on their own innovative case study, getting access to ESA EO huge competence, computing resources, and facilities. They usually stay with Φ-lab from few weeks, for a full immersion, up to 2 years for a more strategic partnership. The Φ-lab is also producing artificial intelligence models and making it available online as open source.

== See also ==
- List of ESA programmes and missions
- Earth observation
- ESA CubeSats
