= IRIDE =

Italian Earth observation satellite system

- Mission type: Earth observation
- Operator: ASI, ESA

Spacecraft properties
- Manufacturer: Argotec (MS2-HEO); OHB Italia (MS1-EAGLET2); SITAEL S.p.A (HYP-PLATINO); Thales Alenia Space (SAR-NIMBUS & VHR-NIMBUS); D-Orbit (SAR-NOX)
- Launch mass: 70 kg (150 lb) (MS2-HEO); 580 kg (1,280 lb) (SAR-NOX)

Start of mission
- Launch date: First: 14 January 2025 (IRIDE-MS2-HEO 1); Last (recent): 1 October 2026 (IRIDE-MS1-EAGLET2 17-24)
- Rocket: Falcon 9 Block 5 Vega-C
- Launch site: Vandenberg, SLC-4E; Kourou, ELV
- Contractor: SpaceX; Arianespace/Avio

Orbital parameters
- Reference system: Geocentric orbit
- Regime: Sun-synchronous orbit

IRIDE (Italian: Iniziative di Resilienza per l'Italia Dalle Emergenze, Initiatives for Italy's Resilience from Emergencies) is an Italian Earth observation satellite programme developed under the National Recovery and Resilience Plan (PNRR) and the National Complementary Plan (NCP). Coordinated by the European Space Agency (ESA) in collaboration with the Italian Space Agency (ASI), IRIDE aims to establish a comprehensive satellite constellation for environmental monitoring, disaster management, civil protection, security, and public administration support. The programme, involving over 73 Italian companies, is designed as a "constellation of constellations" with advanced sensor technologies. IRIDE became operational on 1 July 2026.

== Satellite Technologies ==
IRIDE's constellation is built on multiple platforms, enabling high-revisit rates, all-weather/day-night imaging, and versatile applications:

1) Hawk for Earth observation (HEO) platform, developed by Argotec involved in manufacturing 25 IRIDE satellites.

2) EAGLET2 platform, developed by OHB Italia involved in manufacturing 24 IRIDE satellites.

3) PLATINO bus, developed by SITAEL S.p.A with Hyperspectral Imaging payloads from Leonardo involved in manufacturing 5 IRIDE Satellites.

4) NIMBUS platform, developed by Thales Alenia Space involved in manufacturing 12 SAR and one VHR IRIDE satellite

5) one IRIDE-SAR-NOX satellite developed by D-Orbit for the IRIDE programme

== Launch history ==
Name	SATCAT	Launch date (UTC)	Launch vehicle	Inclination	Status
IRIDE-MS2-HEO 1	62697	14 January 2025	Falcon 9 Block 5 Transporter-12	98°	Operational
IRIDE-MS2-HEO 2	64569	23 June 2025	Falcon 9 Block 5 Transporter-14	98°	Operational
IRIDE-MS2-HEO 3	64568	23 June 2025	Falcon 9 Block 5 Transporter-14	98°	Operational
IRIDE-MS2-HEO 4	64582	23 June 2025	Falcon 9 Block 5 Transporter-14	98°	Operational
IRIDE-MS2-HEO 5	64571	23 June 2025	Falcon 9 Block 5 Transporter-14	98°	Operational
IRIDE-MS2-HEO 6	64576	23 June 2025	Falcon 9 Block 5 Transporter-14	98°	Operational
IRIDE-MS2-HEO 8	64587	23 June 2025	Falcon 9 Block 5 Transporter-14	98°	Operational
IRIDE-MS2-HEO 9	64585	23 June 2025	Falcon 9 Block 5 Transporter-14	98°	Operational
IRIDE-MS1-EAGLET2 1		28 November 2025	Falcon 9 Block 5 Transporter-15	98°	Operational
IRIDE-MS1-EAGLET2 2		28 November 2025	Falcon 9 Block 5 Transporter-15	98°	Operational
IRIDE-MS1-EAGLET2 3		28 November 2025	Falcon 9 Block 5 Transporter-15	98°	Operational
IRIDE-MS1-EAGLET2 4		28 November 2025	Falcon 9 Block 5 Transporter-15	98°	Operational
IRIDE-MS1-EAGLET2 5		28 November 2025	Falcon 9 Block 5 Transporter-15	98°	Operational
IRIDE-MS1-EAGLET2 6		28 November 2025	Falcon 9 Block 5 Transporter-15	98°	Operational
IRIDE-MS1-EAGLET2 7		28 November 2025	Falcon 9 Block 5 Transporter-15	98°	Operational
IRIDE-MS1-EAGLET2 8		28 November 2025	Falcon 9 Block 5 Transporter-15	98°	Operational
IRIDE-MS1-EAGLET2 9		30 March 2026	Falcon 9 Block 5 Transporter-16		Operational
IRIDE-MS1-EAGLET2 10		30 March 2026	Falcon 9 Block 5 Transporter-16		Operational
IRIDE-MS1-EAGLET2 11		30 March 2026	Falcon 9 Block 5 Transporter-16		Operational
IRIDE-MS1-EAGLET2 12		30 March 2026	Falcon 9 Block 5 Transporter-16		Operational
IRIDE-MS1-EAGLET2 13		30 March 2026	Falcon 9 Block 5 Transporter-16		Operational
IRIDE-MS1-EAGLET2 14		30 March 2026	Falcon 9 Block 5 Transporter-16		Operational
IRIDE-MS1-EAGLET2 15		30 March 2026	Falcon 9 Block 5 Transporter-16		Operational
IRIDE-MS1-EAGLET2 16		30 March 2026	Falcon 9 Block 5 Transporter-16		Operational
IRIDE-MS2-HEO 7		3 May 2026	Falcon 9 Block 5 CAS500-2 rideshare	98.1°	Operational
IRIDE-MS2-HEO 10		3 May 2026	Falcon 9 Block 5 CAS500-2 rideshare	98.1°	Operational
IRIDE-MS2-HEO 11		3 May 2026	Falcon 9 Block 5 CAS500-2 rideshare	98.1°	Operational
IRIDE-MS2-HEO 12		3 May 2026	Falcon 9 Block 5 CAS500-2 rideshare	98.1°	Operational
IRIDE-MS2-HEO 13		3 May 2026	Falcon 9 Block 5 CAS500-2 rideshare	98.1°	Operational
IRIDE-MS2-HEO 14		3 May 2026	Falcon 9 Block 5 CAS500-2 rideshare	98.1°	Operational
IRIDE-MS2-HEO 15		3 May 2026	Falcon 9 Block 5 CAS500-2 rideshare	98.1°	Operational
IRIDE-MS1-EAGLET2 17		1 October 2026	Falcon 9 Block 5 Transporter-18		Operational
IRIDE-MS1-EAGLET2 18		1 October 2026	Falcon 9 Block 5 Transporter-18		Operational
IRIDE-MS1-EAGLET2 19		1 October 2026	Falcon 9 Block 5 Transporter-18		Operational
IRIDE-MS1-EAGLET2 20		1 October 2026	Falcon 9 Block 5 Transporter-18		Operational
IRIDE-MS1-EAGLET2 21		1 October 2026	Falcon 9 Block 5 Transporter-18		Operational
IRIDE-MS1-EAGLET2 22		1 October 2026	Falcon 9 Block 5 Transporter-18		Operational
IRIDE-MS1-EAGLET2 23		1 October 2026	Falcon 9 Block 5 Transporter-18		Operational
IRIDE-MS1-EAGLET2 24		1 October 2026	Falcon 9 Block 5 Transporter-18		Operational

== See also ==
- Italian Space Agency
- European Space Agency
- Atlantic Constellation
- List of European Space Agency programmes and missions
