= AIX (satellites) =

Series of Italian technology demonstration small satellites

- Manufacturer: (Italy) Planetek
- Country of origin: Italy; European Space Agency
- Operator: (Italy) Planetek
- Applications: Technology demonstration
- Website: https://www.aiexpress.eu/

Specifications
- Spacecraft type: CubeSat
- Regime: Sun-synchronous orbit

Production
- Planned: 3
- Built: 3
- Launched: 3
- Operational: 3
- Maiden launch: 14 January 2025
- Last launch: 28 November 2025

Related spacecraft
- Launch vehicle: Falcon 9

AIX (AI-eXpress) is a series of technology demonstration small satellites developed by the Italian company Planetek with support of the European Space Agency (ESA). The three satellites (AIX-1p, AIX-1, and AIX-1+) are designed to test various technologies in the areas of edge computing, machine learning, and blockchain for in-orbit data processing on Earth observation satellites. The project is supported by the ESA's InCubed co-funding programme.

== Satellites ==
Name	COSPAR ID	Launch date	Launch vehicle	Flight
AIX-1p		14 January 2025	Falcon 9 + ION Satellite Carrier	Transporter-12
AIX-1		23 June 2025	Falcon 9	Transporter-14
AIX-1+	2025-276AL	28 November 2025	Falcon 9	Transporter-15

== See also ==
- List of European Space Agency programmes and missions
- List of spaceflight launches in January–March 2025
- List of spaceflight launches in April–June 2025
- List of spaceflight launches in October–December 2025
