= SAWA (spacecraft) =

European space weather-monitoring satellite

Sawa
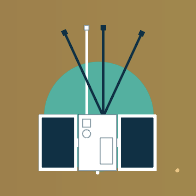
- Mission type: Space weather
- Operator: European Space Agency
- Mission duration: 3 years (planned)

Spacecraft properties
- Bus: HyperSat
- Manufacturer: (Poland) Creotech Instruments SA

Start of mission
- Launch date: 2028 (planned)

Orbital parameters
- Reference system: Geocentric
- Regime: Sun-synchronous
- Altitude: ~550 km

Sawa, named after Sawa, is a future space weather mission for monitoring Earth's thermosphere and magnetic field, under development by the European Space Agency's Space Safety Programme (S2P). Sawa will be the second space weather nanosatellite of ESA's Distributed Space Weather Sensor System (D3S). It is designed to provide observations complementing the first D3S mission, SWING. The spacecraft, based on the HyperSat platform, will include three instruments developed by the Space Research Center of the Polish Academy of Sciences (Note: The Space Research Center would become the Polish Space Agency in 2014.) and one by the Wrocław University of Science and Technology. The mission's primary contractor is the Polish company Creotech Instruments SA. It is expected to launch in 2028.

== See also ==
- List of European Space Agency programmes and missions
- List of Polish satellites
