= 2017 SG33 =

Mars-crosser asteroid

2017 SG_{33}
Discovery
- Discovered by: Pan-STARRS
- Discovery site: Haleakala Obs.
- Discovery date: 25 September 2017 (first observation only)

Designations
- Minor planet category: Mars crosser

Orbital characteristics
- Epoch 25 September 2017 (JD 2458021.5)
- Uncertainty parameter 9
- Observation arc: 2 days
- Aphelion: 3.174±0.115 AU
- Perihelion: 1.322±0.011 AU
- Semi-major axis: 2.248±0.081 AU
- Eccentricity: 0.4120±0.0165
- Orbital period (sidereal): 3.37±0.18 years
- Mean anomaly: 359.260°±0.686°
- Mean motion: 0° 17^{m} 32.712^{s} / day
- Inclination: 6.029°±0.200°
- Longitude of ascending node: 187.923°±0.130°
- Argument of perihelion: 173.329°±1.838°
- Earth MOID: 0.3187 AU (120 LD)

Physical characteristics
- Mean diameter: 55 m; 60 m
- Absolute magnitude (H): 23.85±0.14

2017 SG_{33} is a Mars-crossing asteroid that was previously thought to be a near-Earth object. It was first observed on 25 September 2017, when the asteroid was less than 1 AU from Earth and had a solar elongation of 169°. This asteroid had an observation arc of 2 days and was previously a lost asteroid.

This asteroid was previously in the Risk List and the Priority List of the European Space Agency (ESA) - Space Situational Awareness (SSA). The asteroid was also in the Sentry List of the Jet Propulsion Laboratory (JPL) - Center for Near Earth Object Studies (CNEOS). According to the Sentry List at the time, of the possible close encounters with Earth in the foreseeable future, an encounter on 8 September 2051 had the highest risk of impact. Recalculations of the orbit of 2017 SG_{33} from additional observations showed that it does not make any close approaches to Earth, which led to its removal from the Sentry List on 29 July 2021.

== See also ==
- 2015 ME131
- 2016 NL56
- 2017 QC36
- 2017 MZ8
- 2017 DB120
