= (696513) 2016 NL56 =

Near-Earth object and potentially hazardous object

(696513) 2016 NL_{56}
Discovery
- Discovered by: Pan-STARRS 1
- Discovery site: Haleakala Obs.
- Discovery date: 12 July 2016

Designations
- Alternative designations: 2021 NL_{2}
- Minor planet category: NEO · Apollo · PHA

Orbital characteristics
- Epoch 1 July 2021 (JD 2459396.5)
- Uncertainty parameter 1
- Observation arc: 19.93 yr (7,280 d)
- Aphelion: 2.1730 AU
- Perihelion: 0.6402 AU
- Semi-major axis: 1.4066 AU
- Eccentricity: 0.5448
- Orbital period (sidereal): 1.67 yr (609 d)
- Mean anomaly: 279.49°
- Mean motion: 0° 35^{m} 26.88^{s} / day
- Inclination: 4.6011°
- Longitude of ascending node: 340.93°
- Argument of perihelion: 87.408°
- Earth MOID: 0.0035 AU (1.36 LD)
- Venus MOID: 0.01456 AU (2,180,000 km)
- Mars MOID: 0.02041 AU (3,050,000 km)

Physical characteristics
- Mean diameter: 230 m (est. at 0.14)
- Absolute magnitude (H): 20.89; 20.913

(696513) 2016 NL_{56} is a near-Earth object (NEO) and a potentially hazardous object (PHA), meaning that it has an orbit that can make close approaches to the Earth and large enough to cause significant regional damage in the event of impact. It is an Apollo asteroid, meaning that it is an Earth-crossing asteroid that has an orbit larger than the orbit of the Earth. It was first observed on 12 July 2016, when the asteroid was more than 1 AU from Earth and had a solar elongation of 163 degrees.

This asteroid had been a lost asteroid until its rediscovery as, and identification with 2021 NL_{2}, in July 2021. With additional observations recovered dating back as far as August 2001, the object's previously short observation arc of 2.8 days has been extended to almost 20 years, and its roughly calculated orbit has become secure with an uncertainty parameter of 1. It orbits the Sun at a distance of 0.6–2.2 AU once every 20 months (609 days; semi-major axis of 1.41 AU). Its orbit has a high eccentricity of 0.54 and an inclination of 5° with respect to the ecliptic. Based on a generic magnitude-to-diameter conversion, 2016 NL_{56} measures approximately 230 meters (750 ft) in diameter, for an absolute magnitude of 20.9 and an albedo of 0.14.

This asteroid has been in both the Risk List of the European Space Agency (ESA) - Space Situational Awareness (SSA) and in the Sentry List of the Jet Propulsion Laboratory (JPL) - Center for Near Earth Object Studies (CNEOS). On 21 July 2021, this object was removed from the Sentry List, where it was previously listed with the highest Palermo Technical Impact Hazard Scale value due to a possible close encounter with Earth on 5 September 2024.

On 28 February 2122, 2016 NL_{56} will make its closest encounter with Earth at a nominal distance of 1,710,000 kilometers (0.01144 AU). Two hours later, it will pass the Moon at a nominal distance of 1,320,000 kilometers (0.00885 AU). On 2 May 2090, the asteroid will approach Venus at a nominal distance of 6,860,000 kilometers (0.04586 AU). On 11 May 2148, the asteroid will approach Mars at a nominal distance of 3,450,000 kilometers (0.02307 AU).

== See also ==
- 2015 ME131
- 2017 QC36
- 2017 MZ8
- 2017 DB120
- 2017 SG33
