= 2017 MZ8 =

Near-Earth object and potentially hazardous asteroid

2017 MZ_{8}
Discovery
- Discovered by: Pan-STARRS
- Discovery site: Haleakala Obs.
- Discovery date: 22 June 2017 (first observation only)

Designations
- Minor planet category: NEO–Apollo; PHA

Orbital characteristics
- Epoch 23 June 2017 (JD 2457927.5)
- Uncertainty parameter 9 · E
- Observation arc: 1.1 days
- Aphelion: 3.7 AU
- Perihelion: 0.9 AU
- Semi-major axis: 2.3 AU
- Eccentricity: 0.6
- Orbital period (sidereal): 3.51 yr (1,282 d)
- Mean anomaly: 341°±18°
- Mean motion: 0° 16^{m} 51.24^{s} / day
- Inclination: 4.5°±1°
- Longitude of ascending node: 21°±26°
- Argument of perihelion: 337°±57°
- Earth MOID: 0.0185 AU (7.2 LD)

Physical characteristics
- Mean diameter: 110 m; 113 m
- Absolute magnitude (H): 22.0; 22.2; 22.4; 22.5

2017 MZ_{8} is a near-Earth object and a potentially hazardous asteroid, meaning that it has an orbit that can make close approaches to the Earth and large enough to cause significant regional damage in the event of impact. It is an Apollo asteroid, meaning that it is an Earth-crossing asteroid that has an orbit larger than the orbit of the Earth. It was first observed on 22 June 2017, when the asteroid was about 1 AU from Earth and had a solar elongation of 131 degrees.

This asteroid is a lost asteroid. It has a short observation arc of 1.1 days and has not been seen since 2017, so it has an orbit that is only roughly calculated.

This asteroid was in both the Risk List of the European Space Agency (ESA) – Space Situational Awareness (SSA) and in the Sentry List of the Jet Propulsion Laboratory (JPL) - Center for Near Earth Object Studies (CNEOS). According to the Sentry List, of the possible close encounters with Earth in the foreseeable future, an encounter on 19 October 2020 had the highest Palermo Technical Impact Hazard Scale value. This object was removed from the Sentry List on 29 July 2021.

According to the Near Earth Objects Dynamic Site (NEODyS), of the possible close encounters with Earth in the foreseeable future, the next encounter is on 2 October 2043. This encounter has a minimum possible distance of zero, meaning that an impact onto Earth is possible.

== See also ==
- 2015 ME131
- 2016 NL56
- 2017 QC36
- 2017 DB120
- 2017 SG33
