= 2017 DB120 =

Near-Earth object and Amor asteroid

2017 DB_{120}
Discovery
- Discovered by: Pan-STARRS
- Discovery site: Haleakala Obs.
- Discovery date: 25 February 2017 (first observation only)

Designations
- Minor planet category: NEO–Amor

Orbital characteristics
- Epoch 26 February 2017 (JD 2457810.5)
- Uncertainty parameter 9 · E
- Observation arc: 2.4 days
- Aphelion: 3.34±0.99 AU
- Perihelion: 1.07±0.23 AU
- Semi-major axis: 2.20±0.65 AU
- Eccentricity: 0.52±0.25
- Orbital period (sidereal): 3.3±1.5 years
- Mean anomaly: 339°±9°
- Mean motion: 0° 18^{m} 3.6^{s} / day
- Inclination: 4.1°±1.4°
- Longitude of ascending node: 193°±15°
- Argument of perihelion: 31°±33°
- Earth MOID: 0.0697 AU (27 LD)

Physical characteristics
- Mean diameter: 86 m; 90 m
- Absolute magnitude (H): 22.3; 22.9; 23.0

2017 DB_{120} is a near-Earth object, meaning that it has an orbit which brings it into proximity with Earth. It is an Amor asteroid, meaning that its orbit does not cross Earth's orbit, but its perihelion is close to, but greater than, the aphelion of Earth. It was first observed on February 25, 2017, when the asteroid was less than 1 AU from Earth and had a solar elongation of 169°.

This asteroid is a lost asteroid. It has a short observation arc of 2.4 days and has not been seen since 2017, so it has an orbit that is only roughly calculated. Also, there are variations in the absolute magnitude cataloged by various organizations, leading to variations in the estimated size of the asteroid (Sentry list H 23.0 implies 86 m vs MPC H 22.3 implies 120 m). These variations are in addition to the uncertainty in the size estimate caused by the uncertainty in the albedo.

This asteroid was in both the Risk List of the European Space Agency (ESA) - Space Situational Awareness (SSA) and in the Sentry List of the Jet Propulsion Laboratory (JPL) – Center for Near Earth Object Studies (CNEOS). According to the Sentry List, of the possible close encounters with Earth in the foreseeable future, an encounter on 26 March 2061 had the highest Palermo Technical Impact Hazard Scale value. This object was removed from the Sentry List on 29 July 2021.

According to the Near Earth Objects Dynamic Site (NEODyS), of the possible close encounters with Earth in the foreseeable future, the next encounter is on 25 April 2031. This encounter has a minimum possible distance of zero, meaning that an impact onto Earth is possible.

== See also ==
- 2015 ME131
- 2016 NL56
- 2017 QC36
- 2017 MZ8
- 2017 SG33
