= KSO =

KSO may refer to:

== Honours and titles ==
- Commander of the Order of the Sword (Swedish: Kommendör av Svärdsorden)
- Kommunstyrelseordförande, Swedish title for Municipal commissioner, equivalent to mayor
- Order of St. Olav, Norwegian honour

== Orchestras ==
- Kalamazoo Symphony Orchestra, Michigan, United States
- Kaohsiung Symphony Orchestra, Taiwan
- Kensington Symphony Orchestra, London, England
- Kristiansand Symphony Orchestra, Norway

== Radio stations ==
- Call sign used from 1925 until 1935 by AM station KRNT, Des Moines, Iowa, United States
- Call sign used from 1935 until 1989 by AM station KXNO (AM), Des Moines, Iowa, United States

== Other ==
- Kanzelhoehe Solar Observatory, Austria
- Aristoteles Airport, Kastoria, Greece
- Kingsoft Office, software suite
- A make of Vibram FiveFingers footwear
- Keep Sydney Open, or The Open Party in Australia
