= 2015 ME131 =

Near-Earth object and Atira asteroid

2015 ME_{131}
Discovery
- Discovery site: Pan-STARRS at the Haleakala Observatory, Hawaii
- Discovery date: June 23, 2015

Designations
- Alternative designations: 2020 RX_{8}
- Minor planet category: Atira; NEO; IEO

Orbital characteristics
- Epoch 2020-Dec-17 (JD 2459200.5)
- Uncertainty parameter 2
- Observation arc: 5.3 years
- Aphelion: 0.98964 AU (Q)
- Perihelion: 0.64282 AU (q)
- Semi-major axis: 0.81623 AU (a)
- Eccentricity: 0.21245 (e)
- Orbital period (sidereal): 0.74 years
- Mean anomaly: 358.69° (M)
- Inclination: 33.645° (i)
- Longitude of ascending node: 317.78° (Ω)
- Argument of perihelion: 156.86° (ω)
- Earth MOID: 0.0458 AU (6,850,000 km)
- Jupiter MOID: 4.01 AU (600,000,000 km)

Physical characteristics
- Mean diameter: 400 m 500 m
- Absolute magnitude (H): 19.5

2015 ME_{131} was a lost asteroid and a Near-Earth object (NEO). It is an Atira asteroid, which is by far the smallest group of near-Earth objects. This makes it an interior-Earth object (IEO), meaning that it has an orbit entirely confined within Earth's orbit. It was recovered on September 15, 2020 as 2020 RX_{8} which has extended the observation arc from 1.8 days to 5 years. It was removed from the Sentry Risk Table on February 15, 2021 after the two orbits were linked together. It was first observed on June 23, 2015, when the asteroid was more than 1 AU from Earth and had a solar elongation of 68 degrees.

This asteroid was in both the Risk list and the Priority List of the European Space Agency (ESA) - Space Situational Awareness (SSA). This asteroid was also in the Sentry list of the Jet Propulsion Laboratory (JPL) - Center for Near Earth Object Studies (CNEOS). According to the Sentry List, of the possible close encounters with Earth in the foreseeable future, an encounter on August 18, 2020 had the highest Palermo Technical Impact Hazard Scale value.

According to the Near Earth Objects Dynamic Site (NEODyS), of the possible close encounters with Earth in the foreseeable future, the next close encounter is August 10, 2054.

== See also ==
- 2016 NL56
- 2017 QC36
- 2017 MZ8
- 2017 DB120
- 2017 SG33
