= Explorer 40 =

NASA satellite of the Explorer program

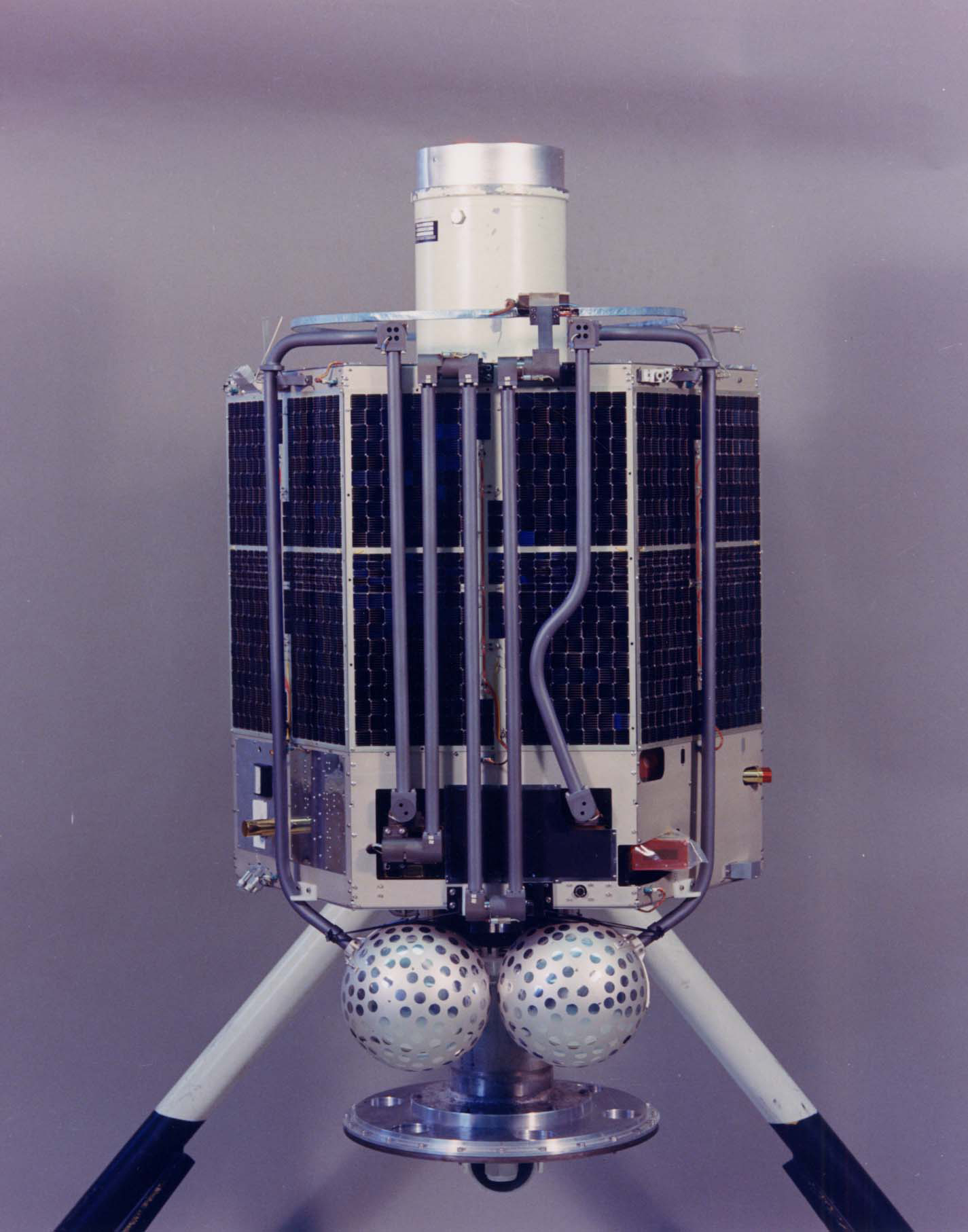
- Explorer 40 satellite
- Names: Injun 5 IE-C; Ionospheric Explorer-C
- Mission type: Ionospheric research
- Operator: NASA
- COSPAR ID: 1968-066B
- SATCAT no.: 03338

Spacecraft properties
- Spacecraft: Explorer XL
- Spacecraft type: Ionospheric Explorer
- Bus: Injun
- Manufacturer: University of Iowa
- Launch mass: 71.4 kg (157 lb)
- Power: Solar cells and rechargeable batteries

Start of mission
- Launch date: 8 August 1968, 20:12:00 GMT
- Rocket: Scout B (S-165C)
- Launch site: Vandenberg, SLC-5
- Contractor: Vought
- Entered service: 8 August 1968

End of mission
- Last contact: Early June 1971

Orbital parameters
- Reference system: Geocentric orbit
- Regime: Low Earth orbit
- Perigee altitude: 665 km (413 mi)
- Apogee altitude: 2,525 km (1,569 mi)
- Inclination: 80.70°
- Period: 118.30 minutes

Instruments
- Low-Energy Proton and Electron Differential Energy Analyzer (LEPEDEA); Solid-State Particle Detector; Spherical Retarding Potential Analyzer; VLF Receiver, 30 cps - 16 kc

Explorer 40 (or Injun 5), was a NASA magnetically aligned satellite launched simultaneously with Explorer 39 (AD-C) (Air Density experiment) using a Scout B launch vehicle.

== Mission ==
Explorer 40 was designed to accomplish the following objectives: (1) comprehensive study of the downward flux of charged particles, (2) study of very low frequency (VLF) radio emission in the ionosphere associated with the downward flux, (3) study of geomagnetically trapped protons, alpha particles, and electrons, (4) observation of solar cosmic rays, (5) observation of the continuing decay of the Starfish Prime artificial radiation belt, and (6) study of the temperature and density of electrons and positive ions of thermal and near thermal energy. The spacecraft systems performed normally except for the malfunction of the solar cell power dump device shortly after launch, which caused the solar cells to deliver a lower power level to the experiments and reduced the time during which the onboard tape recorder could be run. The passive magnetic alignment became effective in mid-December 1968. The spacecraft was turned off from 31 May 1970 to 18 February 1971, after this period it was turned on again. The spacecraft was put in an operational off-mode in early June 1971, and became inoperable shortly thereafter.

== Experiments ==
=== Low-Energy Proton and Electron Differential Energy Analyzer (LEPEDEA) ===
This experiment was designed to conduct detailed measurements of trapped and precipitating proton and electron energy fluxes, separately, over the range 50 eV to 50 keV. The energy spectra of these particles were studied separately as a function of pitch angle, latitude, local time, altitude, and magnetic activity. The detector used was composed of three Low-Energy Proton and Electron Differential Energy Analyzer (LEPEDEA) devices, each made up of cylindrical curved plate electrostatic analyzers and continuous channel multipliers (channeltrons). Each LEPEDEA was accompanied by one EON Type 6213 Geiger–Müller tube for measurements of electron (E>40 keV) and proton (E>500 keV) intensities and to provide background measurements for the LEPEDEA. The detector performed normally from launch until the spacecraft was put in an operational off-mode, except for a temporary failure of the LEPEDEA-C power supply on 21 September 1968, and the failure of a second LEPEDEA sometime during the summer of 1970.

=== Solid-State Particle Detector ===
This experiment was designed to conduct an investigation of the spatial and temporal distributions and energy spectra of low-energy alpha particles, protons, and electrons. A set of solid-state detectors (totally depleted silicon surface barrier type) was used to form a proton-telescope capable of detecting protons from 0.304 to 74 MeV using 10 energy channels and electrons with energies greater than 262, 264, 267, 269, 405, 407, 427, 428, 616, 646, 800, and 833 keV. Included in the experiment was an alpha particle detector, composed of similar solid-state detectors, capable of detecting alphas in the range 1.25 to 8.0, 1.65 to 4.5, and 2.03 to 3.35 MeV. The experiment performed normally.

=== Spherical Retarding Potential Analyzer ===
Two four-grid spherical retarding potential analyzers were used to measure thermal and nonthermal ions and electrons in the energy range 0 to 2 keV. The objective was to study the spatial and temporal variations in the concentration and energy distribution of low energy charged particles between 500 km (310 mi) and 4,000 km (2,500 mi).

=== VLF Receiver, 30 cps - 16 kc ===
This very low frequency (VLF) receiver was designed to study both electric and magnetic components (both phase and amplitude) of VLF signals. The direction of signal propagation could be determined and used to assist in identifying the origins of various VLF signals. The observations of antenna impedance for the electric antenna (ECA) were needed to study characteristics of such an antenna operating in a plasma. There were two antennas, one driving a magnetic-field component receiver (MCR), and the other driving two electric-field component receivers (ECR). The MCR operated from a 55.9 cm (22.0 in)-diameter loop antenna (MCA), and the ECRs operated from an antenna consisting of two 20.3 cm (8.0 in)-diameter aluminum spheres mounted 2.85 m (9 ft 4 in) apart on opposite sides of the spacecraft. Both the MCA and ECA were mounted on booms to reduce interference from the spacecraft. Within a few weeks after launch, the spacecraft was despun and magnetically stabilized so that nominally, the antenna axes and the magnetic field line through the spacecraft were orthogonal. In the northern hemisphere, the MCA supporting boom was inclined earthward. Both the MCR and ECR operated from 10 to 30.E3 Hz. Also operating from the ECA was a narrow-band step frequency receiver (ECR 2) which operated through filters with center frequencies at 7.5, 10.5, 22, 52.5, 70, and 105 (± 7.5 %) kHz. Supplementary to these three receivers and two antennas were (1) a special circuit that could measure phase and amplitude of the impedance on the ECA between 20 and 2.E3 Hz and (2) an electron gun used to bias the ECA. The MCR and ECR 1 observed and telemetered (on a 0.8-watts, 400-MHz channel) analog, broadband data in real time, when the spacecraft was in telemetry range of a ground station. When observing with the impedance circuit on, impedance measurements required 8 of each 30 s of wideband observing time. The signal strength values from the ECR 2, and separately from both the low (0.03 to 0.65 kHz) and high (0.3 to 10 kHz) ranges of the ECR 1 and MCR, were recorded on the spacecraft tape recorder and comprised the digital data for this experiment. In this experiment, the digital data were observed and recorded over a 30-seconds cycle within which the signal amplitudes from the two low-frequency steps of the ECR 2 were observed every 4-seconds (1-second duration) and the other frequencies observed every 8-seconds. When the impedance circuit was on, eight samples of the step receiver data were not observed during each 30-seconds cycle. Experiment performance was nominal. Failure of the spacecraft power regulator early in the mission limited operation to some extent, but nominal data were obtained until 29 May 1970. Principal telemetry sites for the data through May 1970 were in Iowa and Alaska.

== See also ==
- Injun satellites
- Explorer 25
- Explorer program
