= Flyeye =

Early-warning system for near-Earth objects

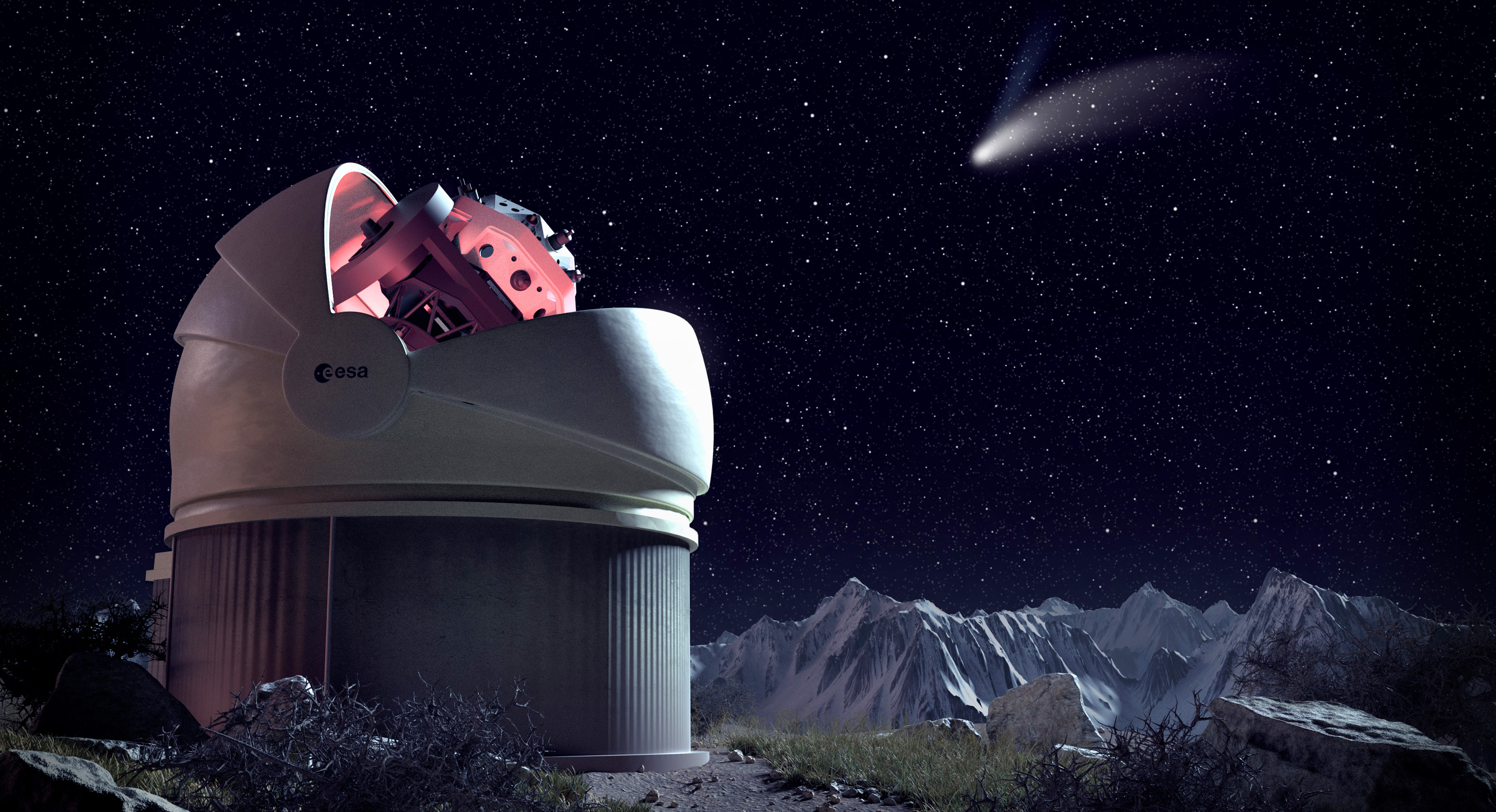
- Artist's impression of the Flyeye telescope
- Alternative names: NEOSTEL
- Organization: European Space Agency
- Observatory code: S16
- Related media on Commons

Flyeye, or the Near Earth Object Survey TELescope (NEOSTEL), is an astronomical survey and early-warning system for detecting near-Earth objects sized 40 metres (130 feet) and above a few weeks before they impact Earth. The project is part of the "Planetary Defence Cornerstone" of the European Space Agency (ESA)'s Space Safety Programme. Its first telescope, build by OHB, is located in Italy. If the initial prototype is successful, three more telescopes are planned, in complementary positions around the globe close to the equator. All potential new asteroid detections made by the telescopes will be verified by ESA's Near-Earth Object Coordination Centre (NEOCC) and then submitted to IAU's Minor Planet Center.

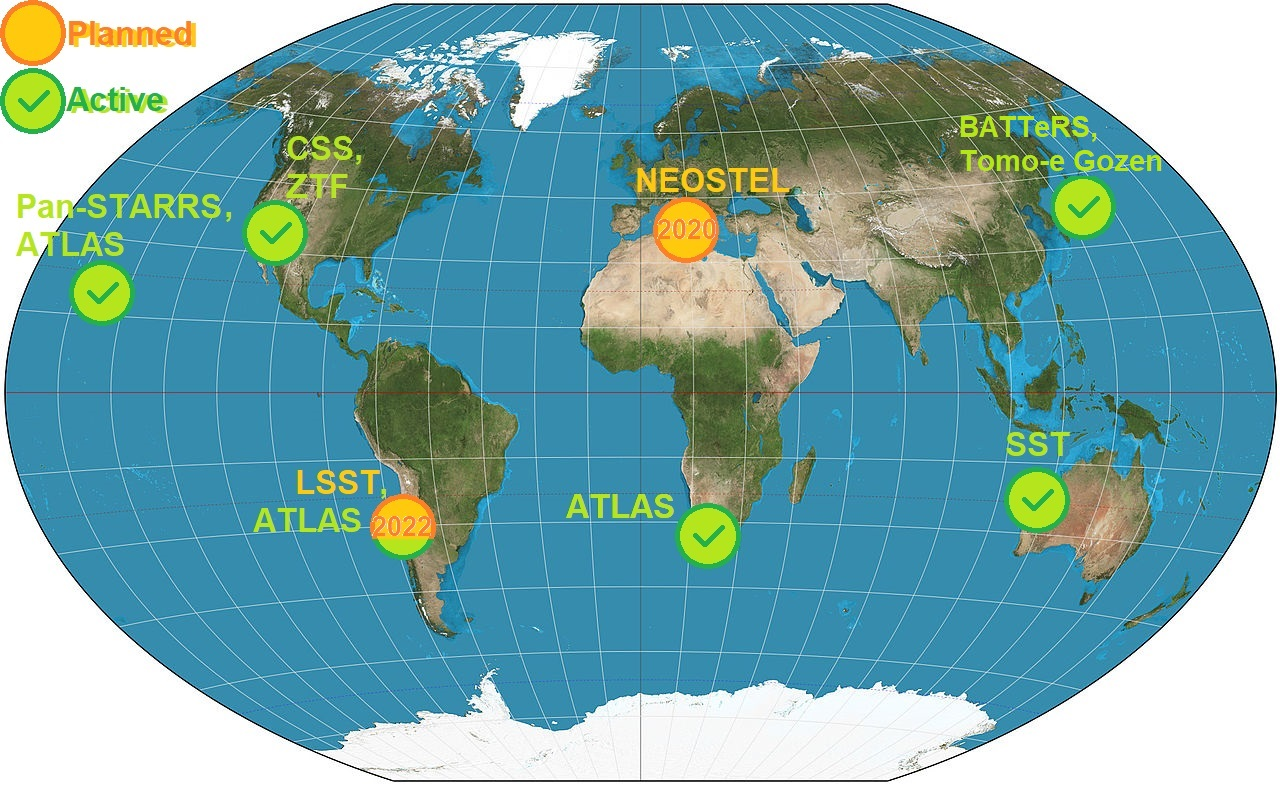
Sited around 120° (8 hours) east of existing surveys, the planned Flyeye (NEOSTEL) and ATLAS telescopes will improve global coverage dramatically

== History ==
The first telescope (Flyeye-1 or S16-ASI Matera Flyeye) was completed in 2024 and installation on Mount Mufara, Sicily was completed in 2025, having been agreed with the Italian Space Agency in October 2018. The first light of the telescope was on 20 May 2025.

Observations of asteroid (35107) 1991 VH made using ESA's Flyeye telescope. These images were acquired on 20 May 2025 during the telescope's first light campaign.

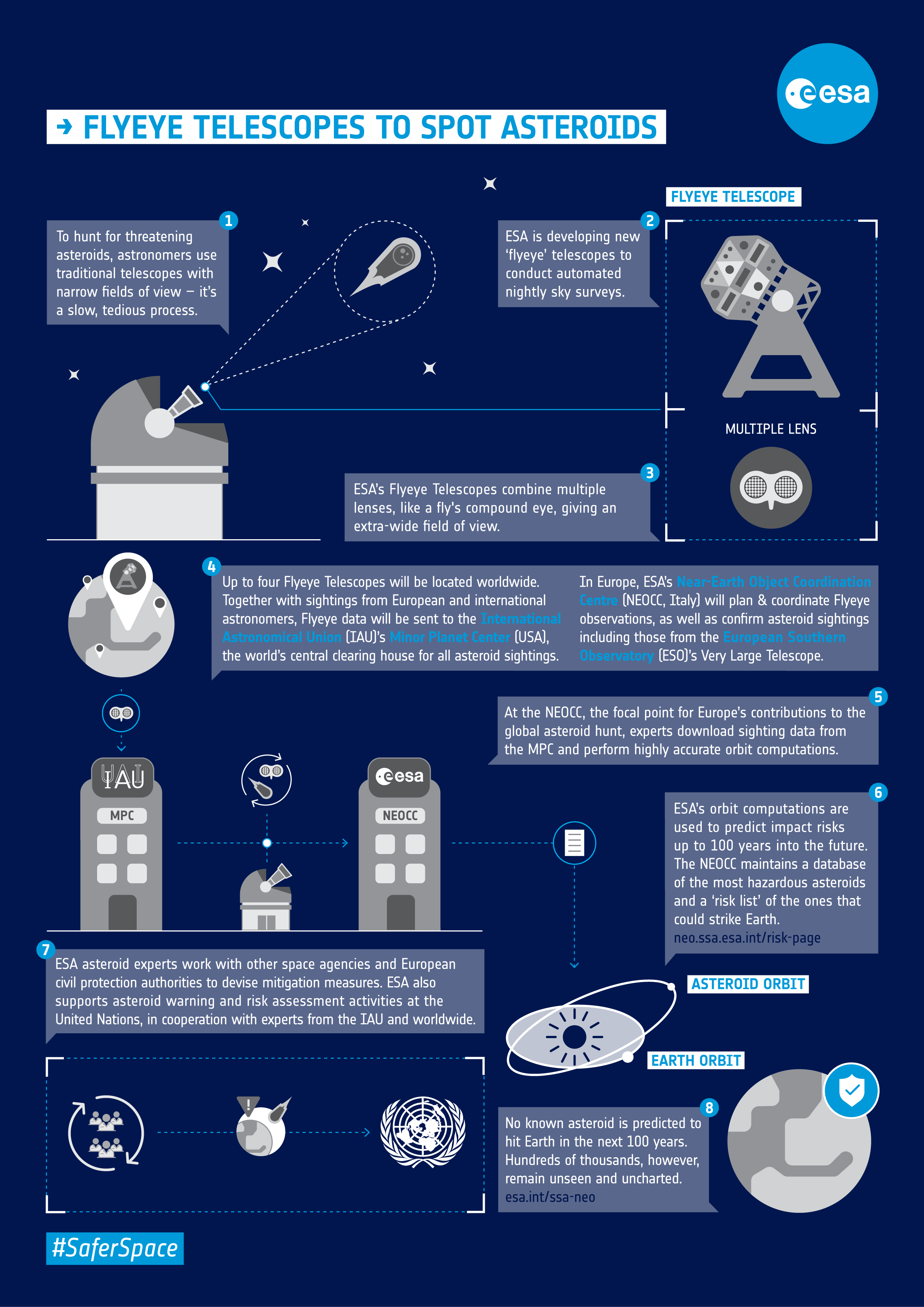
Flyeye telescopes infographic by ESA

== Design ==
The telescope is of a new "fly-eye" design inspired by the wide field of vision from a fly's eye. The design combines a single objective reflector with multiple sets of optics and CCDs, giving a very wide field of view (around 45 deg^{2}, or 220 times the area of the full moon). It has one of the widest fields of view of any telescope and be able to survey the majority of the visible sky in a single night. In terms of light gathering power, the size of the primary mirror is not directly comparable to more conventional telescopes because of the novel design, but is equivalent to a conventional 1-metre telescope and should have a limiting magnitude of around 21.

== Optics ==
The fly eye aspect of the telescope refers to the use of compound optics, as opposed to the single set of optics used in a conventional telescope. Classically, telescopes were designed around a single human observer looking through an eye piece. Astrographs were developed in the 19th century where a photographic plate, or later a CCD, records the image, which a human observer can then view. With the human eye no longer directly observing the image there is no longer a restriction on a single viewing point, and asteroid detection software has become fully automated, so a human observer need not view the majority of images at all.

Light enters the Flyeye telescope through the aperture and is reflected off the primary mirror onto a secondary, consisting of 16 mirrors arranged on a hexadecagonal pyramid. The split beam then passes into 16 separate aspheric lenses and on to 16 corresponding CCD image sensors. Flyeye uses the 16 CCD cameras to view 45 square degrees of light entering the telescope aperture. The pixel scale is 1.5 arc seconds per pixel across the whole field of view.

== Observatory ==
Flyeye's detection capabilities and the quality of service it requires (in particular, the use of a fast slewing equatorial mount) mean that a standard telescope dome and observatory design will not be sufficient. Work has been carried out on optimizing the design of the infrastructure layout to solve these problems, whilst minimising the impact of the infrastructure on the environment in Madonie Regional Natural Park, where Monte Mufara is situated.

== See also ==
- List of near-Earth object observation projects
- Asteroid Terrestrial-impact Last Alert System
- Asteroid impact prediction
- Space Safety Programme
- Near-Earth Object Coordination Centre
- List of ESA programmes and missions
