= 2017 QC36 =

Near-Earth object and potentially hazardous asteroid

2017 QC_{36}
Discovery
- Discovered by: WISE
- Discovery site: Low Earth orbit
- Discovery date: 18 August 2017 (first observation only)

Designations
- Minor planet category: NEO; PHA; Aten

Orbital characteristics
- Epoch 21 November 2025 (JD 2461000.5)
- Uncertainty parameter 0
- Observation arc: 5.19 yr (1897 days)
- Earliest precovery date: 13 June 2017
- Aphelion: 1.0359 AU
- Perihelion: 0.5625 AU
- Semi-major axis: 0.7994 AU
- Eccentricity: 0.29617
- Orbital period (sidereal): 0.71 yr (260.9 days)
- Mean anomaly: 49.040°
- Mean motion: 1° 22^{m} 46.474^{s} / day
- Inclination: 17.317°
- Longitude of ascending node: 136.660°
- Argument of perihelion: 356.577°
- Earth MOID: 0.0218 AU (8.5 LD)

Physical characteristics
- Mean diameter: 240 m (assumed albedo 0.14)
- Absolute magnitude (H): 20.70±0.32 (JPL); 20.7 (MPC)

2017 QC_{36} is a near-Earth object and a potentially hazardous asteroid of the Aten group, It measures approximately 200 meters (660 feet) in diameter and was briefly observed by the Wide-field Infrared Survey Explorer on 18 August 2017 before it became a lost asteroid on the following day. It was later recovered in 2021 from archival Pan-STARRS and Cerro Tololo observations made in 2017. The asteroid was observed again in 2022.

== Description ==
2017 QC_{36} is an Aten asteroid, meaning that it is an Earth-crossing asteroid that has an orbit smaller than the orbit of the Earth. The asteroid has an observation arc of nearly 5 years, corresponding to a well-defined orbit. This is indicated by an uncertainty parameter or condition code of 0 (orbit uncertainty estimate is 0−9, with 0 being good, and 9 being highly uncertain).

This asteroid was first observed by the Wide-field Infrared Survey Explorer (WISE) space telescope which was placed into Low Earth Orbit in 2009. The asteroid's observation by WISE occurred on 18 August 2017, when it was less than 1 AU from Earth and had a solar elongation of 92°. It remained a lost asteroid with a single-day observation arc until 9 May 2021, when it was linked with Pan-STARRS 1 observations from 3 and 20 August 2017. Additional precovery observations from Cerro Tololo/DECam on 26 July 2017 were later found and published by the Minor Planet Center on 8 July 2021.

The estimated diameter of the asteroid depends on its absolute magnitude and geometric albedo. Given an absolute magnitude of 20.8 and an assumed albedo range of 0.05 to 0.25 (for a body of carbonaceous and stony composition, respectively), the estimated mean diameter of the asteroid ranges 180 to 410 meters (590 to 1,300 feet). Using the general assumption of an albedo of 0.14, the mean diameter is around 240 meters (790 feet).

== Close encounters ==
As a near-Earth object and a potentially hazardous asteroid – meaning that it has an orbit that can make close approaches to the Earth and large enough to cause significant regional damage in the event of impact – it was previously in the European Space Agency's Risk List and the Jet Propulsion Laboratory's Sentry List. It was removed from both lists on 9 May 2021, after additional Pan-STARRS observations of the asteroid were linked.

The last close encounter within 0.10 AU (15 million km; 9.3 million mi) of Earth was on 16 August 2017, two days prior to its discovery by WISE. The next such encounters will occur on 15 August 2022, 15 August 2027, and 15 August 2032, and 17 August 2037. The nominal closest approach distances for these dates are 0.078 AU, 0.074 AU, 0.082 AU, and 0.100 AU, respectively.

== See also ==
- 2015 ME131
- 2016 NL56
- 2017 MZ8
- 2017 DB120
- 2017 SG33
