= Near-Earth Object Coordination Centre =

Centre within the European Space Agency's Planetary Defense Office

ESA logo

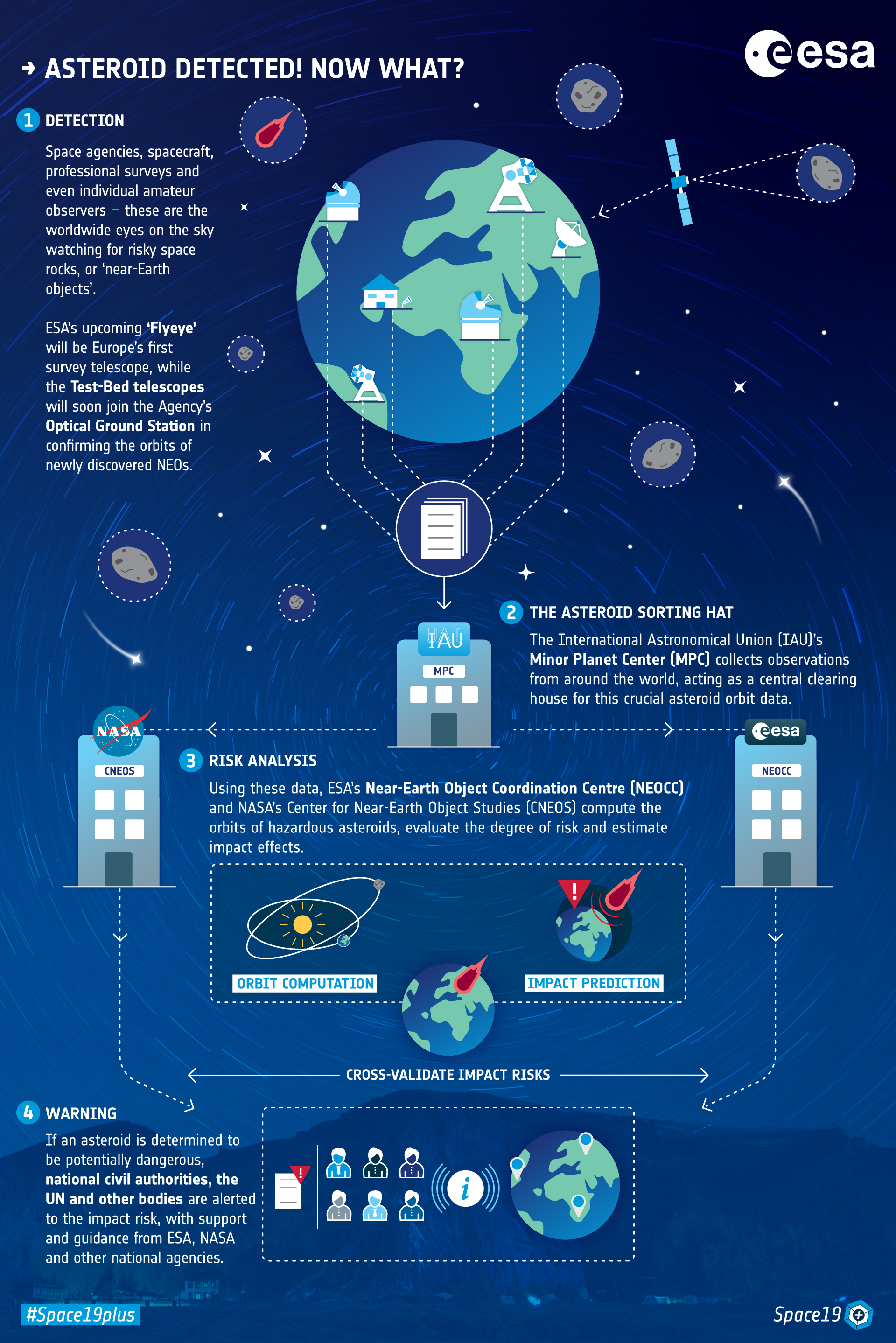
Using the data from the Minor Planet Center, ESA's NEOCC and NASA's CNEOS determine the orbits of hazardous asteroids and assess their risk

The Near-Earth Object Coordination Centre (NEOCC) is the main centre of the Planetary Defence Office of the European Space Agency (ESA). The NEOCC and the Planetary Defence Office are parts of the agency's Space Safety Programme (S2P). The NEOCC, which is based at ESRIN in Frascati, Italy, coordinates observations of small bodies such as asteroids and comets in the Solar System in order to evaluate and monitor the threat posed by those potentially hazardous. NEOCC also conducts studies with the purpose of improving near-Earth object warning services. These are necessary to give real-time alerts to different organizations, scientific bodies, and decision-makers.

== NEODyS ==
From 2012, the NEOCC web portal provided data calculated by the University of Pisa spin-off company NEODyS. From 2019 to 2020, NEOCC implemented its own computation capability, using software developed by NEODyS. The orbit calculation and impact risk data provided by NEOCC on its website is slightly different from similar data NEODyS provides on its own website due to software updates.

== See also ==
- Flyeye
- Space Safety Programme
- List of European Space Agency programmes and missions
