= ClearSpace-1 =

European mission to demonstrate space debris removal

- Mission type: Technology demonstration
- Operator: ESA

Spacecraft properties
- Manufacturer: OHB SE

Start of mission
- Launch date: 2030 (planned)
- Rocket: Vega C
- Launch site: Guiana Space Centre

Orbital parameters
- Reference system: Geocentric
- ESA insignia Space Safety Programme

The ClearSpace-1 (ClearSpace One) mission is an ESA Space debris removal mission designed by the Swiss company ClearSpace SA and led by OHB SE. The mission's objective is to remove the PROBA-1 satellite from orbit. The mission aims to demonstrate technologies for rendezvous, capture, and deorbit for end-of-life satellites and to build a path to space junk remediation. Destructive reentry will destroy both the captured satellite and itself. It is expected to launch in 2030.

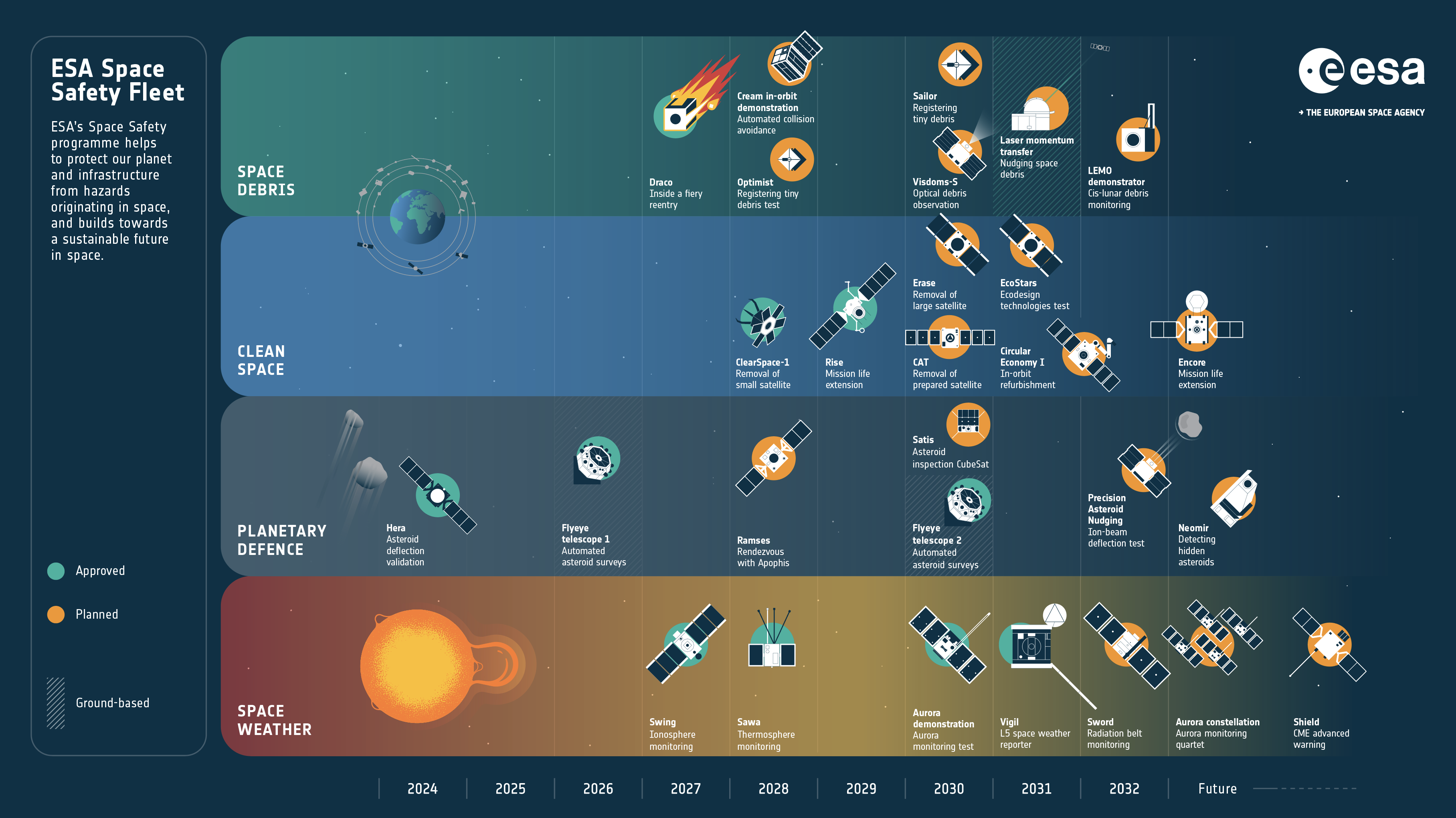
Proposed ESA Space Safety Fleet, 2025

== History ==
In 2019, ClearSpace SA won a tender for a ESA's Space Safety Programme contract in the Active Debris Removal/In-Orbit Servicing (ADRIOS) project. ClearSpace-1's original target was the VESPA payload adapter from the 2013 Vega flight VV02. In April 2024, the target was changed to the PROBA-1 satellite. The mission contract, worth 86 million euros, was signed in November 2020. As of May 2023, ClearSpace-1 was expected to be launched in the second half of 2026 on a Vega-C launch vehicle.

The VESPA adapter that ClearSpace-1 originally aimed to capture is the size of a washing machine and weighs about 112 kilograms. ClearSpace-1's device has been described as a four-armed "space claw" that would grip VESPA and steer it back into the Earth's atmosphere, where both would be destroyed via destructive reentry.

On 22 August 2023, the European Space Agency announced that the VESPA adapter had likely been hit by a small piece of space debris earlier in the month, resulting in the creation of several additional pieces of trackable debris. In April 2024, due to the possibility of a collision with debris, the agency opted to change ClearSpace-1's target to the PROBA-1 satellite. Also, OHB SE took over the project leadership. As of February 2026, ClearSpace-1 was expected to be launched in 2028. On 17 November 2026, OHB SE was awarded a €102 million contract by ESA to build the ClearSpace-1 spacecraft. At that time, the mission was expected to be launched in 2030.

== Similar attempts ==
The ClearSpace-1 mission was preceded by e.Deorbit, a space debris removal mission under planning by ESA in 2010s. In the end, the e.Deorbit mission was not implemented, the satellite was not built and the whole e.Deorbit mission was cancelled.

Tokyo-based Astroscale is a space debris removal company testing a removal device called End-of-Life Services (ELSA-d) that successfully demonstrated many of the key technologies required for space debris removal in 2021 and 2022, including magnetic docking with a client in 2021 and close approach RPO in 2022. As of 2023 ELSA-d was in its de-orbiting phase.

In 2022, the UK Space Agency awarded £4 million to ClearSpace and Astroscale to remove non-operational British satellites by 2026.

== See also ==
- List of European Space Agency programmes and missions
- PRELUDE
