= PRELUDE =

European technology demonstration satellites

- Mission type: Technology demonstration
- Operator: European Space Agency
- Website: clearspace.today/missions/prelude

Spacecraft properties
- Bus: 2× 16U CubeSat
- Manufacturer: (Switzerland) ClearSpace SA

Start of mission
- Launch date: 2027 (planned)

PRELUDE is a future space mission for technology demonstration of operations needed for on-orbit satellite servicing and active space debris removal. The mission, consisting of two identical 16U CubeSat-type small satellites flying in formation, is being developed by Switzerland-based company ClearSpace for the European Space Agency (ESA) and its Space Safety Programme (S2P). The two satellites will be launched together and, once in space, they will perform a series of complex manoeuvres representing both cooperative and uncooperative proximity operations. PRELUDE's launch is expected in 2027.

== See also ==
- List of European Space Agency programmes and missions
- ClearSpace-1
