= Aurora (satellites) =

European space weather monitoring satellites

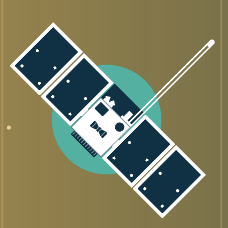
- Operator: European Space Agency
- Applications: Space weather

Production
- Planned: 5 to 7
- Launched: 0
- Maiden launch: 2030 (planned)

Aurora-D and Aurora-C are future space weather missions under development by the European Space Agency's Space Safety Programme (S2P). Aurora-D (Demonstration) is a single spacecraft intended to demonstrate technologies needed for Aurora-C (Constellation), a full operational constellation of four to six small satellites in medium Earth orbit (MEO) enabling a continuous auroral oval monitoring for improved understanding of geomagnetic storms and other space weather effects. Aurora will be the third part of ESA's Distributed Space Weather Sensor System (D3S). The Aurora-D mission has been approved by ESA and its launch is expected in 2030.

== Instruments ==
The primary instrument of the satellites will be the Wide Field of View Auroral Imager (WFAI) consisting of two components, the Auroral Optical Spectral Imager (AOSI) and the Auroral UV Imager (AUI). The satellites will be also equipped with in-situ measurement instruments, possibly a magnetometer, plasma monitor and/or neutral atom particle spectrometer.

== See also ==
- List of European Space Agency programmes and missions
- Swarm – ESA's space program to study Earth's magnetic field
- FrontierSat – Canadian satellite focused on atmospheric science
