= E.Deorbit =

Cancelled mission to remove space debris

e.Deorbit
- Mission type: Active debris removal
- Operator: ESA

Spacecraft properties
- Launch mass: 1,600 kilograms (3,500 lb)

Start of mission
- Launch date: 2025 (planned)
- Rocket: Vega
- Launch site: ELA-1, Guiana Space Centre
- Contractor: Arianespace

End of mission
- Disposal: Deorbit (planned)

Capture of derelict satellite

e.Deorbit was a planned European Space Agency active space debris removal mission developed as a part of their Clean Space initiative. The launch was planned for 2025 on board a Vega launch vehicle. Funding of the mission was stopped in 2018 in favor of the ClearSpace-1 mission, which is now under development.

== Overview ==
A 1,600-kilogram (3,500 lb) spacecraft was to be launched on board a Vega rocket into a polar orbit at an altitude of 800–1,000 kilometres (500–620 mi). Once on orbit, the spacecraft would rendezvous with the derelict satellite Envisat which is in an unknown condition, inoperative, and probably tumbling.

Capture would be conducted in one of two ways: either by using mechanical tentacles or nets. The tentacles option included equipping the spacecraft with robotic arms, one of which will first capture a holding point, before the remaining arms embrace the derelict and secure it with a clamping mechanism. The net option included equipping the spacecraft with a deployable net on a tether, that will envelop the target derelict before the spacecraft will begin changing orbit. The net option has the advantage of being able to capture objects with a wide range of sizes and spins.

After successfully capturing the targeted derelict, the spacecraft would deorbit itself, performing a controlled atmospheric reentry.

== History ==
The mission was developed at ESA's Concurrent Design Facility, with studies for the Clean Space programme on de-orbiting techniques being carried out in 2009. The first symposium about the mission took place in May 2014. Early testing included successful attempts at capturing scale model satellites by shooting nets from compressed air ejectors. The first design stage was completed in June 2015, with a systems requirements review being conducted in May–June 2016 and a final mission approval taking place in December 2016.

== See also ==
- RemoveDEBRIS, a similar concept that combined four experiments for future Active Debris Removal technology: a net, a harpoon, a Vision-Based Navigation (VBN) system and a dragsail.
- ClearSpace-1, the follow-up of e.Deorbit: a mission that will use e.Deorbit's tentacles option to capture the PROBA-1 satellite.
