= FrontierSat =

Canadian satellite focused on atmospheric science

- Names: CTS-SAT 1
- Operator: (Canada) University of Calgary
- COSPAR ID: 2026-100D
- SATCAT no.: 69015
- Website: www.calgarytospace.ca/cts-sat-1

Spacecraft properties
- Spacecraft type: 3U CubeSat

Start of mission
- Launch date: 3 May 2026, 7:00 UTC
- Rocket: Falcon 9 CAS500-2 rideshare mission

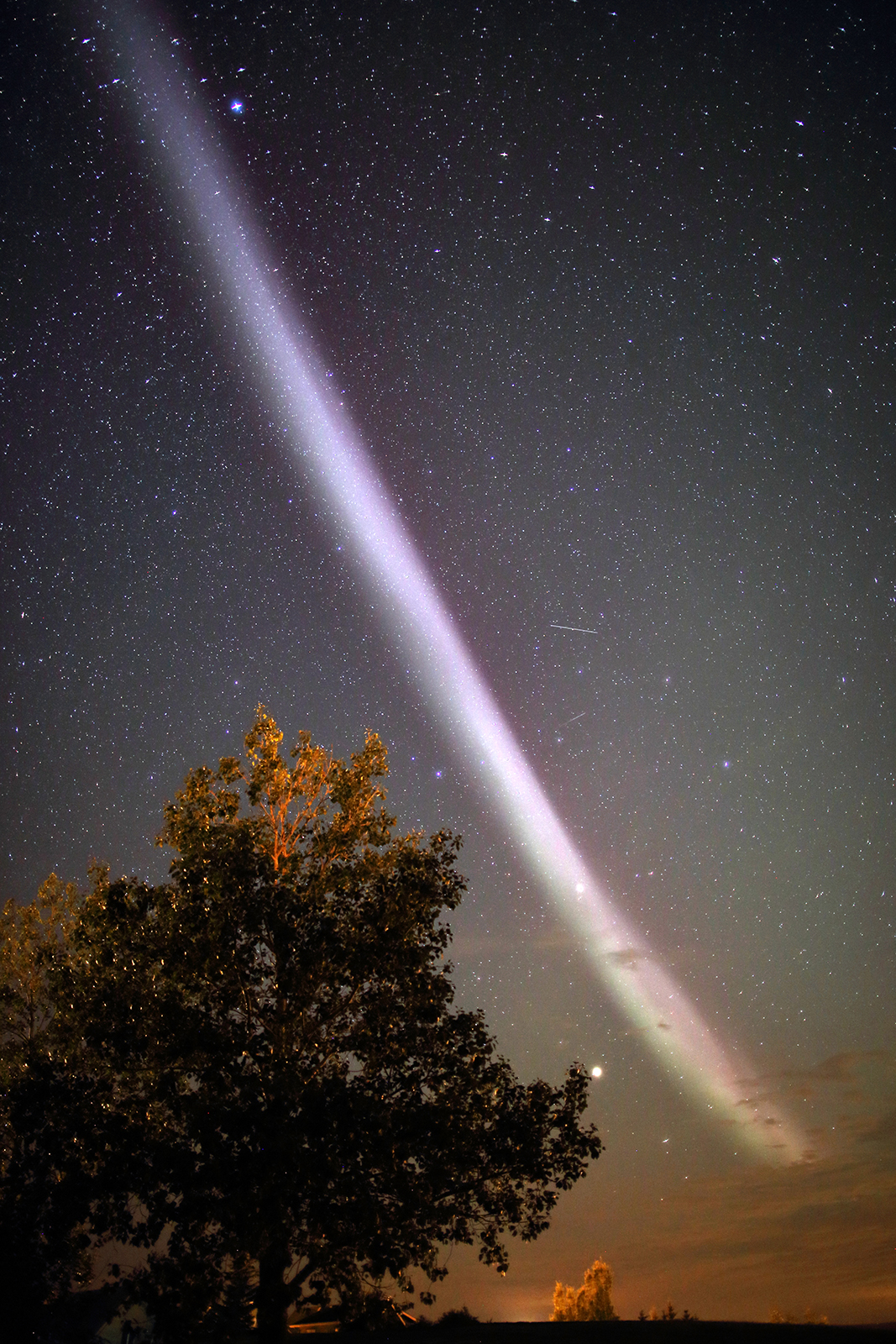
STEVE over Alberta, August 2015

FrontierSat is an atmospheric science and technology demonstration space mission in the form of a 3U CubeSat-type small satellite. The spacecraft was developed by "CalgaryToSpace", a team of University of Calgary students. Its development was supported by University of Calgary, the Canadian Space Agency, and the European Space Agency's Fly Your Satellite! program. The satellite was launched on May 3, 2026 on the Falcon 9's CAS500-2 rideshare mission. Once in orbit, it successfully started transmitting beacon data.

== Payload ==
FrontierSat carries two payloads. The Mini Plasma Imager (MPI), based on the Thermal Ion Imager (TII) instruments of ESA's Swarm mission, is designed to study the aurora-like STEVE phenomenon. The camera-monitored Deployable Composite Lattice Boom (DCLB) will test boom deployment technology.

=== Mini Plasma Imager ===
The Mini Plasma Imager (MPI) flown on FrontierSat was developed at the University of Calgary. It is a charged-particle anemometer. Within the instrument, an electrostatic analyzer sorts incoming ions by their kinetic energy per unit charge. An IonCCD, a form of charge-coupled device, detects the ions. The instrument outputs 32 frames per second, generating a raw telemetry stream of approximately 5100 bytes per second.

== See also ==
- Aurora-D and Aurora-C – European space weather monitoring satellites
