= TIRA =

Radar facility in Germany

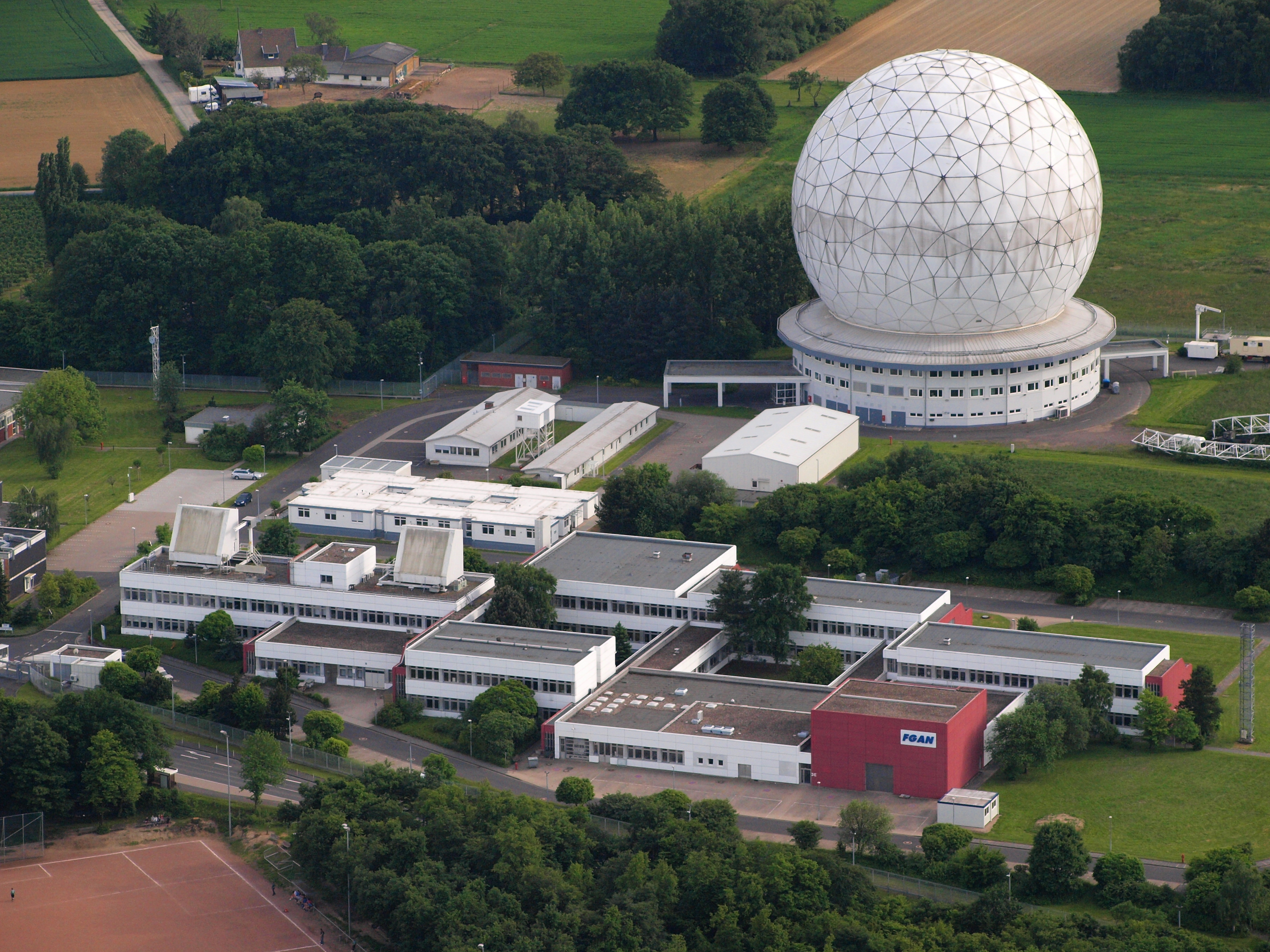
- Alternative names: Tracking & Imaging Radar
- Location: Wachtberg, Rhein-Sieg-Kreis, Cologne, North Rhine-Westphalia, Germany
- Coordinates: 50°37′N 7°08′E
- Location within Germany
- Related media on Commons

The Tracking & Imaging Radar (TIRA) system serves as the central experimental facility for the development and investigation of radar techniques for the detection and reconnaissance of objects in space, and (to a certain degree) of air targets.

TIRA is located at the FGAN site, in Wachtberg near Bonn, Germany. It is run by the Fraunhofer-Gesellschaft-FHR – the Fraunhofer-Institut für Hochfrequenzphysik und Radartechnik (High Frequency Physics and Radar Techniques), part of the German Fraunhofer Society.

TIRA has a 34-metre parabolic dish antenna which is a monopulse radar operating at 1.333 GHz or 22.5 cm (L band) and 16.7 GHz or 1.8 cm (Ku band) wavelengths. The L-band is usually used for tracking debris with a 0.45° beam width, at 1 MW peak power. The system is capable of determining orbits from direction angles, range and Doppler shift for single targets. The detection size threshold is about 2 cm at 1000 km range. The radar conducts regular ‘beam park’ experiments, where the radar beam is pointed in a fixed direction on the celestial sphere for 24 hours, scanning 360° in a narrow strip a complete Earth rotation. The tracking sensitive can be enhanced when the TIRA system is used as a transmitter, part of a bistatic radar system. In conjunction with the Effelsberg Radio Telescope, functioning as a receiver, the combined system has a detection size threshold of 1 cm. The Ku-band is used for imaging in Inverse Synthetic Aperture Radar (ISAR) mode, with 13 kW peak power, the radar is capable of producing images with range resolutions better than 7 cm. The dish can be turned full 360° in azimuth with speed of 24° per second and 90° in elevation. The radar is protected by a radome with 47 meters diameter – one of the largest in the world.

Due to its capabilities, the system is used as a radar tracking system for space debris and other in-orbit object in the ESA's Space Situational Awareness Programme (SSA).

Technical data of the antenna
Reflector Diameter	34m
Shape Accuracy of Surface	< 0.5 mm
Azimuth Range	360°
Maximum Rotation Speed	24°/sec.
Elevation Range	from 0° to 90°
Total Weight	240 t

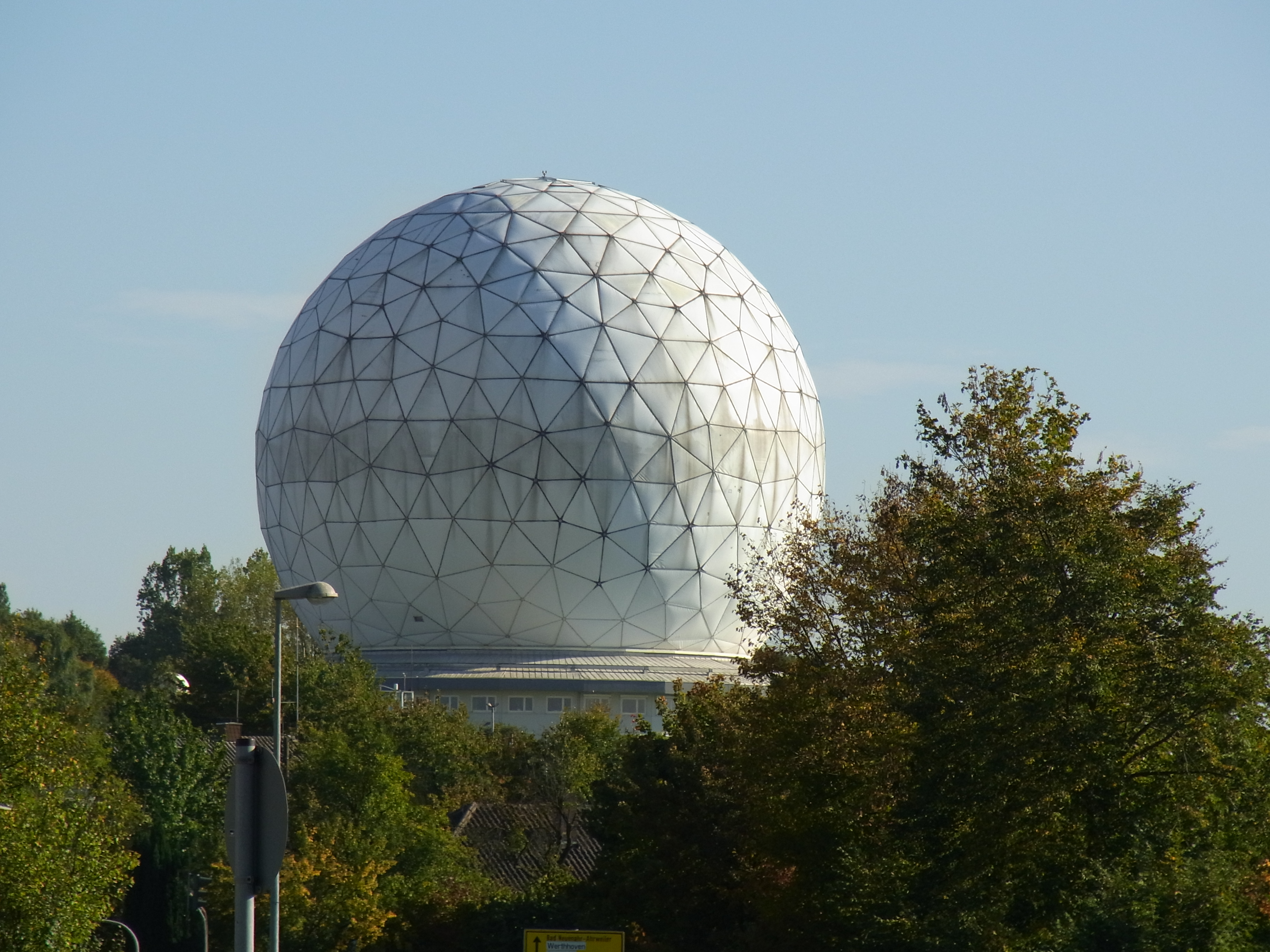
2010.
