= Electrostatic analyzer =

Type of spectrometer component that only allows electrons of certain frequencies in

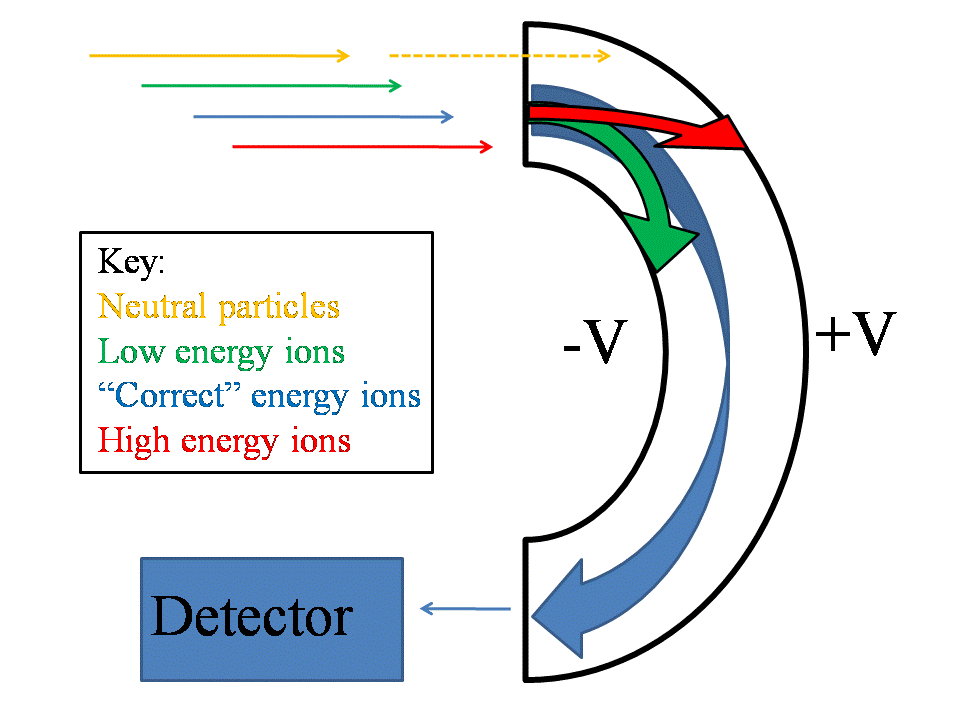
A simplified diagram of an electrostatic analyzer deflecting the trajectories of ions that pass through.

An electrostatic analyzer or ESA is an instrument used in ion optics that employs an electric field to allow the passage of only those ions or electrons that have a given specific energy. It usually also focuses these particles (concentrates them) into a smaller area. ESAs are typically used as components of space instrumentation, to limit the scanning (sensing) energy range and, thereby also, the range of particles targeted for detection and scientific measurement. The closest analogue in photon optics is a filter.

== Radial cylindrical analyzer ==
Electrostatic analyzers are designed in different configurations. A simple version is a radial cylindrical analyzer, which consists of two curved parallel plates at different potentials. Ions or electrons enter the analyzer at one end and either pass through the other end or collide with the walls of the analyzer, depending on their initial energy. In these types of analyzers, only the radial component of the velocity of a charged particle is changed by an ESA since the potential on the plates only varies in the radial direction if one considers the geometry in cylindrical coordinates. Poisson's Equation can be then used to calculate the magnitude of the electric field pointing radially inwards. The resultant inward-pointing force generated by this electric field will cause the particles' trajectories to curve in a uniform circular motion. Depending on initial energy (velocity), only certain particles will therefore have the "correct" motion to exit the analyzer by tracing its physical structure, while others will collide into the walls of the instrument. In addition to the energy, the angle of entry will also affect the particles' time-of-flight through the analyzer as well as exit angle. In practice, the plates are usually oppositely charged and at very high potentials. Also, the inner surface of the analyzer, usually made of aluminum for space missions, is sometimes plated with black chrome or even Ebonol C to absorb stray light, instead of allowing it to bounce its way through.

== Face-field cylindrical and conical electrostatic energy analyzers ==
The well-known class of cylindrical face-field energy analyzers, and a more recently developed type of face-field conical electrostatic energy analyzers, are instruments with a very wide area of application. These instruments can achieve very high energy resolution combined with large acceptance aperture, which is very important for measurements of in-space plasma flows. This new class of analyzers can be used in a variety of applications for studying objects with different forms and sizes, and for analysis of remote objects in the exploration of nanomaterials within a set of different methods.

ESAs are usually designed and analyzed using an off-the-shelf ion-optics simulation-software package which includes the capability of performing Monte Carlo simulations on known test particles, thus providing the designer a better understanding of the response characteristics of the analyzer itself.

== Use in space instrumentation ==
Examples of space instruments or missions using Electrostatic Analyzers:

- The CAPS (Cassini Plasma Spectrometer) instrument on the Cassini-Huygens spacecraft
- IBEX-Hi and IBEX-Lo instruments on the Interstellar Boundary Explorer spacecraft
- Mariner 10
- The SWAP (Solar Wind Analyser around Pluto) instrument on the New Horizons spacecraft
- Pioneer 6, 7, and 8 missions
- Ranger 1
- THEMIS mission
- The ASPERA-3 and ASPERA-4 IMA instruments onboard Mars Express and Venus Express
- The ICA and IES ion and electron instruments on board the ESA/Rosetta mission
- The SWIA, SWEA and STATIC instruments on MAVEN. STATIC includes a time-of-flight measurement to obtain the mass/charge ratio in addition to its electrostatic analyzer.
- Jovian Auroral Distributions Experiment (JADE) on the Juno (spacecraft) Jupiter orbiter
- Solar Probe ANalyzer (SPAN) on board the Parker Solar Probe mission
- Solar Wind and Pickup Ions (SWAPI) instrument aboard the Interstellar Mapping & Acceleration Probe (IMAP).
- The Mini Plasma Imager (MPI) instrument aboard the FrontierSat 3U CubeSat mission

== See also ==
- Ion Optics
