= Wars and Sawa =

Legendary eponyms of Warsaw, Poland

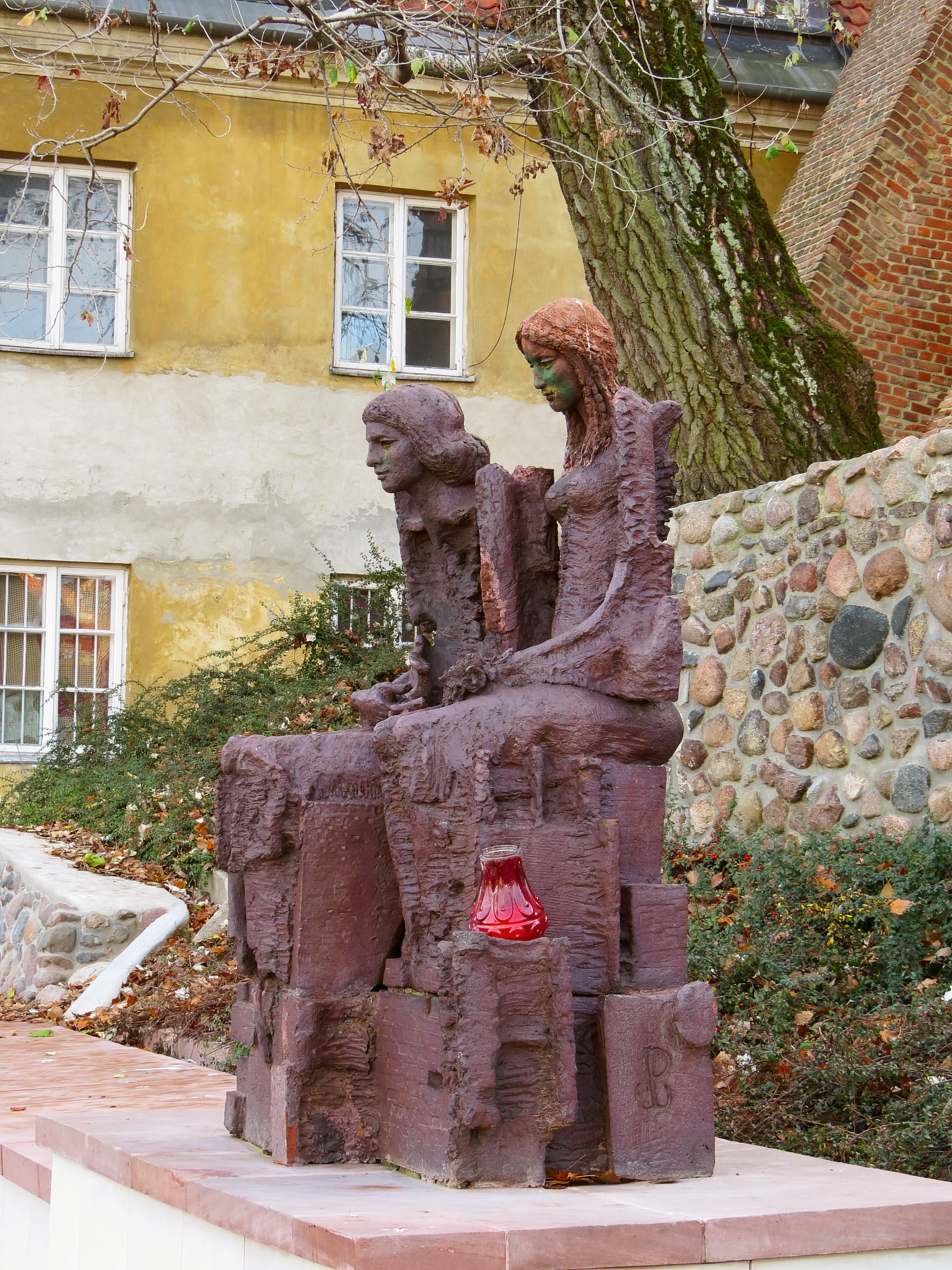
Statue of Wars and Sawa in the Warsaw Old Town (Brzozowa Street).

Wars (Polish: [ˈvars], also known as War, Polish: [ˈvar], and Warsz, Polish: [ˈvarʂ]) and Sawa (Polish: [ˈsa.va]) are legendary characters from the origin myth of the founding and etymology of the city of Warsaw, capital of Poland. There are several versions of the legend with their appearance.

== In legend ==
According to one version of the legend, the duke or king called Kazimierz (Casimir), sometimes also identified as duke Siemowit I of Masovia, got lost in the forest, where Warsaw Old Town is currently located, while hunting. He came across a small adobe hut, inhabited by a woman who had recently given birth to twins. The woman hosted him very generously. He named her two children Wars and Sawa and gave the woman money to build a bigger house. Later, other people moved near the house, forming a settlement, which was named after the twins, Warsawa, which later evolved to Warszawa, the name of the city of Warsaw in the Polish language. According to a different version of the legend, Wars and Sawa were a married couple who lived in that house, and who hosted the duke.

According to another version of the legend, Sawa was a mermaid living in the Vistula river with whom a fisherman named Wars fell in love.

In yet another version of the legend, Wars and Sawa were brothers, who were fishermen living near modern Warsaw Old Town.

== Citations ==
=== Bibliography ===
- Anna Marta Zdanowska, Julia Odnous: Legendy warszawskie. Antologia. Warsaw: Museum of Warsaw, 2016, ISBN 978-83-62189-80-9.
- Encyklopedia Warszawy. Warsaw: Wydawnictwo Naukowe PWN, 1994, ISBN 83-01-08836-2.
- Franciszek Galiński: Gawędy o Warszawie. Warsaw: Instytut Wydawniczy Biblioteka Polska, 1939.
- Encyklopedia Warszawy. Warsaw, Państwowy Instytut Wydawniczy, 1975.
- Anna Wilczyńska: Wielka księga legend Warszawy. Warsaw: Skarpa Warszawska, 2017. ISBN 978-83-63842-42-0.
