= PROBA-1 =

European Space Agency satellite

- Names: PROBA, PROBA-1
- Mission type: Experimental, Earth Observation
- Operator: ESA
- COSPAR ID: 2001-049B
- SATCAT no.: 26958
- Website: Proba-1 applications
- Mission duration: Elapsed: 25 years, 5 days

Spacecraft properties
- Bus: PROBA
- Manufacturer: Verhaert Space
- Launch mass: 94 kg (207 lb)
- Dry mass: 94 kg (207 lb)
- Dimensions: 0.6 m × 0.6 m × 0.8 m (2 ft 0 in × 2 ft 0 in × 2 ft 7 in)
- Power: 90 W

Start of mission
- Launch date: 04:53, 22 October 2001 (UTC)
- Rocket: PSLV C3
- Launch site: Sriharikota FLP
- Contractor: ISRO

Orbital parameters
- Reference system: Geocentric
- Regime: Sun-synchronous
- Eccentricity: 0.008866
- Perigee altitude: 553 km (344 mi)
- Apogee altitude: 677 km (421 mi)
- Inclination: 97.9 degrees
- Period: 97 minutes
- Epoch: 22 October 2001 00:53:00 UTC

PROBA-1 (Project for On-Board Autonomy), originally PROBA, is a Belgian satellite technology demonstration mission launched atop an Indian Polar Satellite Launch Vehicle by ISRO on 22 October 2001.

== History ==
The satellite was funded through the ESA's MicroSat and General Study Program with the objective of addressing issues regarding on-board operational autonomy of a generic satellite platform. This small (60×60×80 cm; 95 kg) boxlike system, with solar panel collectors on its surface, hosts two Earth Observation instruments dubbed CHRIS and HRC. CHRIS is a hyperspectral system (200 narrow bands) that images at 17 m resolution, while HRC is a monochromatic camera that images visible light at 5 m resolution.

With an initial lifetime of one to two years, the satellite celebrated its 20th year of operations in 2021. On 9 March 2018, it surpassed ERS-2 as ESA's longest operated Earth observation mission of all time. ESA aims to deorbit the satellite through the ClearSpace-1 mission in 2026.

"PROBA" also refers to the PROBA series of satellites starting with PROBA-1. The name is also used to refer to the bus of the satellites.

== See also ==
- Miniaturized satellite
- List of European Space Agency programs and missions
