= NEOMIR =

Proposed European infrared space telescope for detecting asteroids

- Mission type: Space telescope for planetary defense
- Operator: ESA

Start of mission
- Launch date: 2030s (planned)
- Rocket: Ariane 62

Main telescope
- Diameter: 55 centimetres (22 in)
- ESA insignia Space Safety Programme

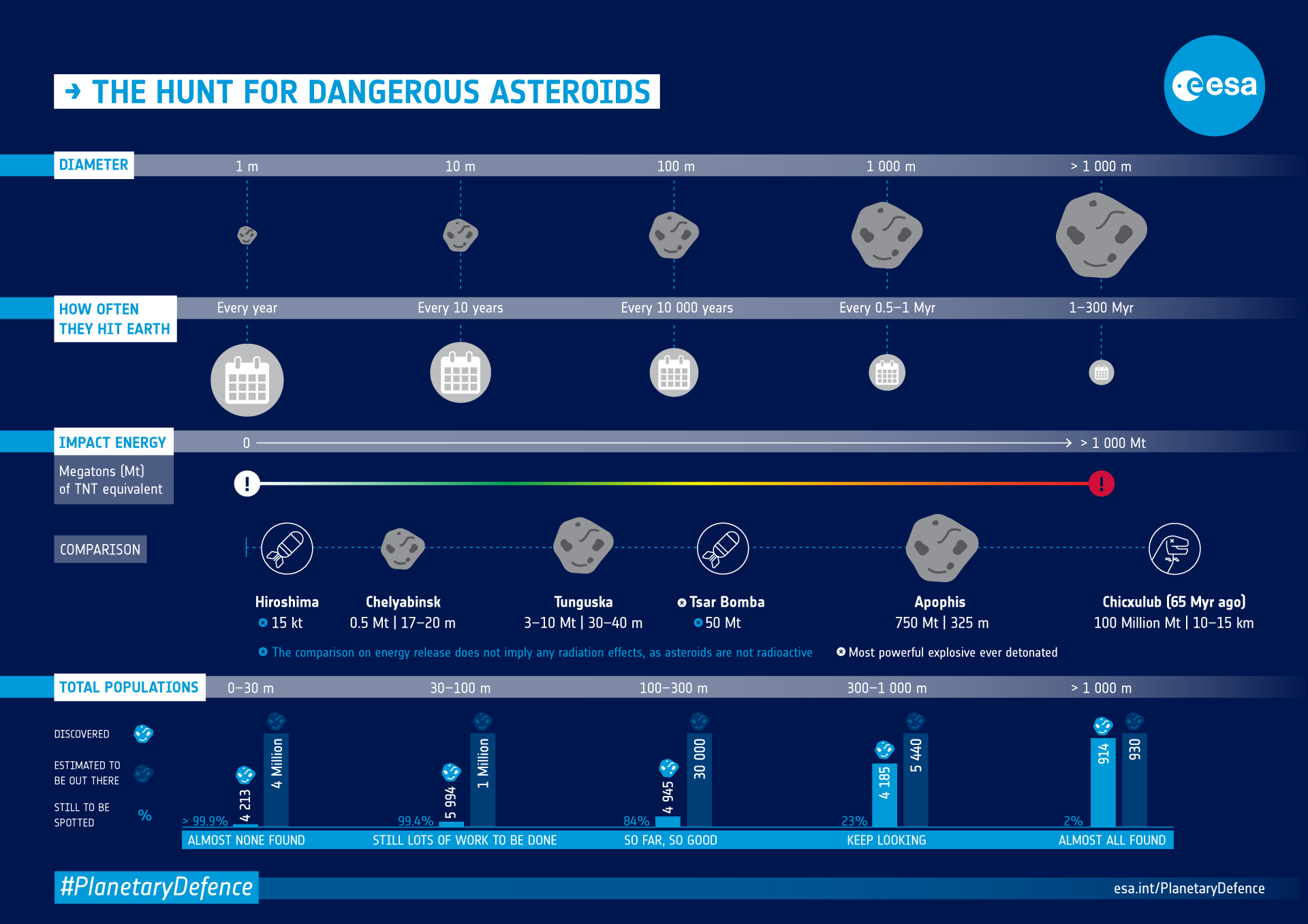
Assessing the threat posed by asteroids

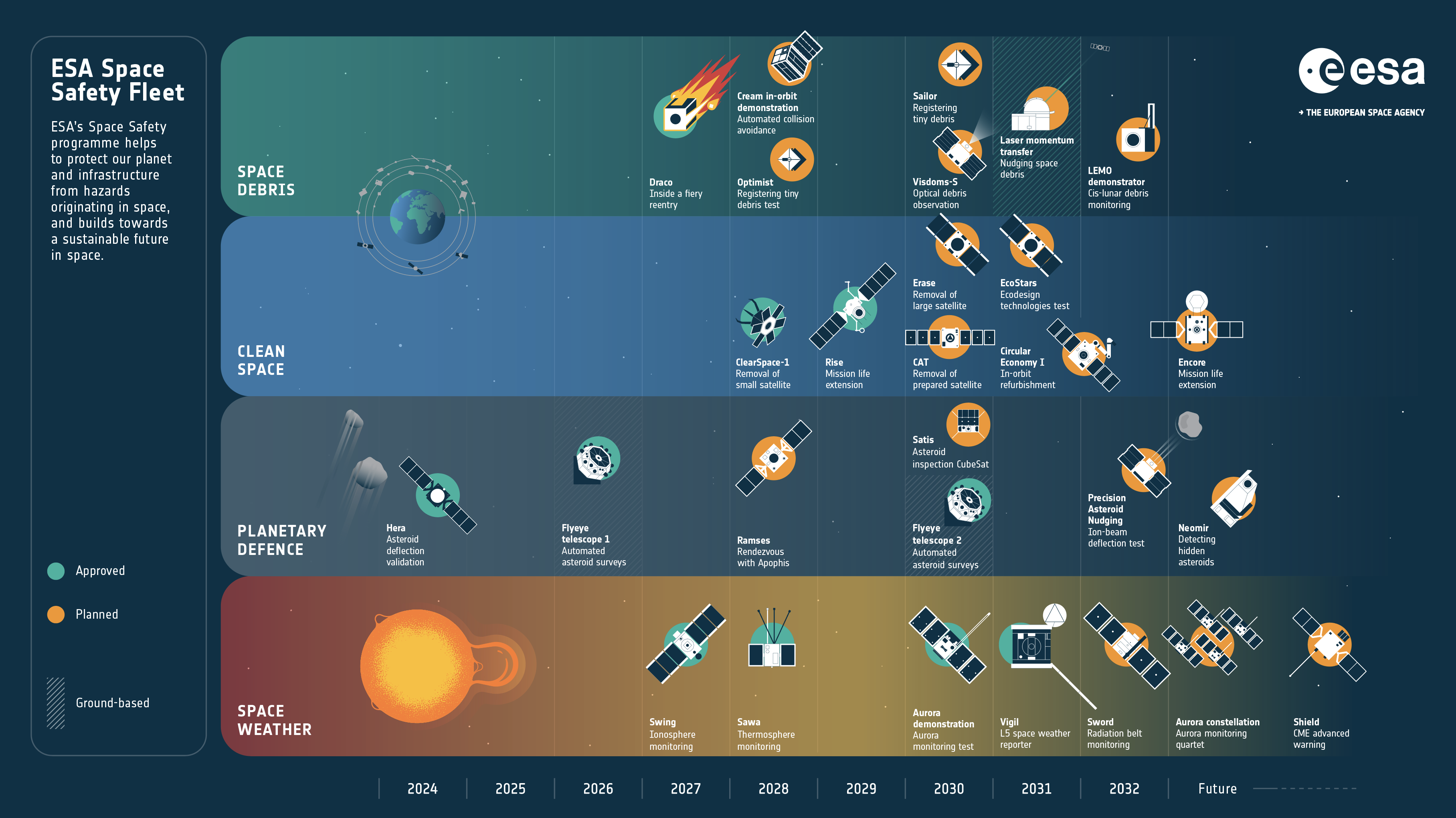
Proposed ESA Space Safety Fleet

NEOMIR (Near-Earth Object Mission in the Infrared) is a proposed planetary defense space telescope under development by the European Space Agency (ESA). If approved, NEOMIR will be placed into the Sun–Earth Lagrange point L_{1} in order to have a constant view of Near-Earth Asteroids coming toward Earth from the direction of the Sun. By observing in the infrared, NEOMIR will detect the heat emitted by asteroids that isn't drowned out by sunlight. This mode of observation will fill a gap in current asteroid-detection capabilities. Its launch is planned for early 2030s on Ariane 62 rocket.

== Objectives ==
The mission will look closer to the sun compared to NASA's NEO Surveyor. NEOMIR will have shorter exposure times and higher cadence of revisit, this will ensure that faster NEOs are not missed. NEOMIR will be able to detect NEOs as small as 20-25 m at 0.1 AU, or at least 3-4 weeks before impact.

== Telescope ==
NEOMIR will be equipped with a cryogenically cooled three-mirror anastigmat telescope, with a mirror size of 55 cm. It will observe the sky in two infrared bands. One at 4-6 μm and the other at 6-10 μm. The shorter wavelength band is used for better astrometry and the longer wavelength band is optimised for a thermal emission of a blackbody with a temperature of 300 K (27 °C; 80 °F).

== See also ==
- List of European Space Agency programmes and missions
- List of objects at Lagrange points
