= SWING (satellite) =

European space weather-monitoring satellite

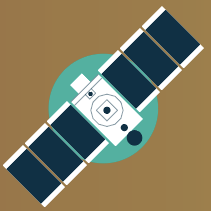
- Mission type: Space weather
- Operator: European Space Agency

Spacecraft properties
- Bus: HP-IOT
- Manufacturer: (France) Hemeria

Start of mission
- Launch date: 2027 (planned)

Orbital parameters
- Reference system: Geocentric
- Regime: Sun-synchronous
- Altitude: Between 500 and 600 km

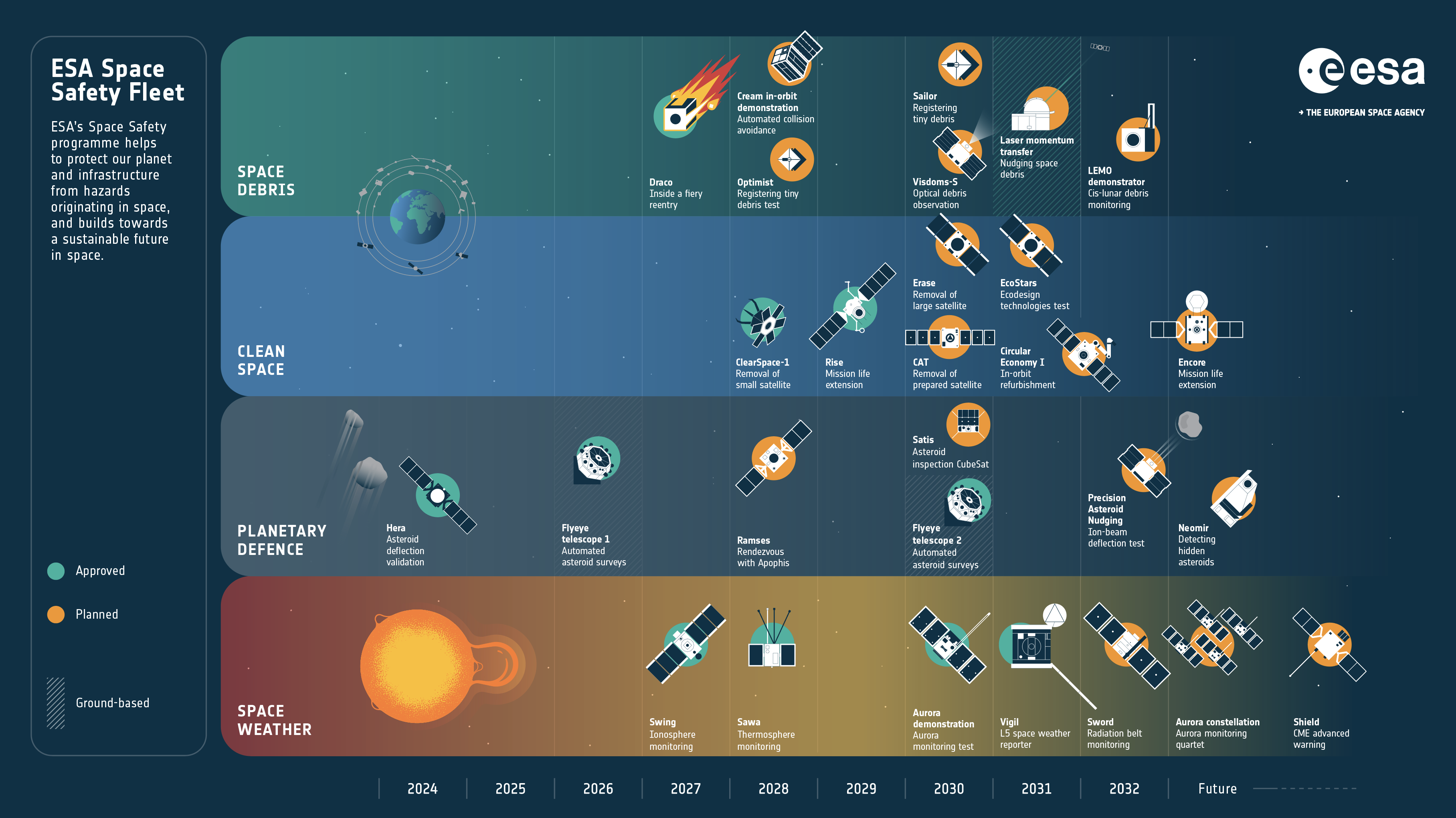
ESA's Space Safety Fleet

SWING (Space Weather Ionosphere Nanosat Generation) is a future space weather mission for monitoring Earth's ionosphere, under development by the European Space Agency's Space Safety Programme (S2P). SWING will be the agency's first space weather nanosatellite and the first part of its Distributed Space Weather Sensor System (D3S). It is expected to launch in 2027.

== Background ==
The prime contractor of the mission is the French company Hemeria, while Syntony GNSS (France) will provide the satellite's GNSS receiver and Planetek (Italy) will develop the mission operations center. The satellite's design is based on Hemeria's HP-IOT nanosatellite platform.

== Instruments ==
The satellites's payload consists of four instruments:

- DREAM, radiation monitor by CNES and Steel Electronique, France
- XFM-NS, X-ray monitor by Isaware, Finland
- m-NLP, Langmuir Probe by EIDEL, Norway
- Aquila, GNSS instrument by Syntony, France
