= Space Safety Programme =

European Space Agency program

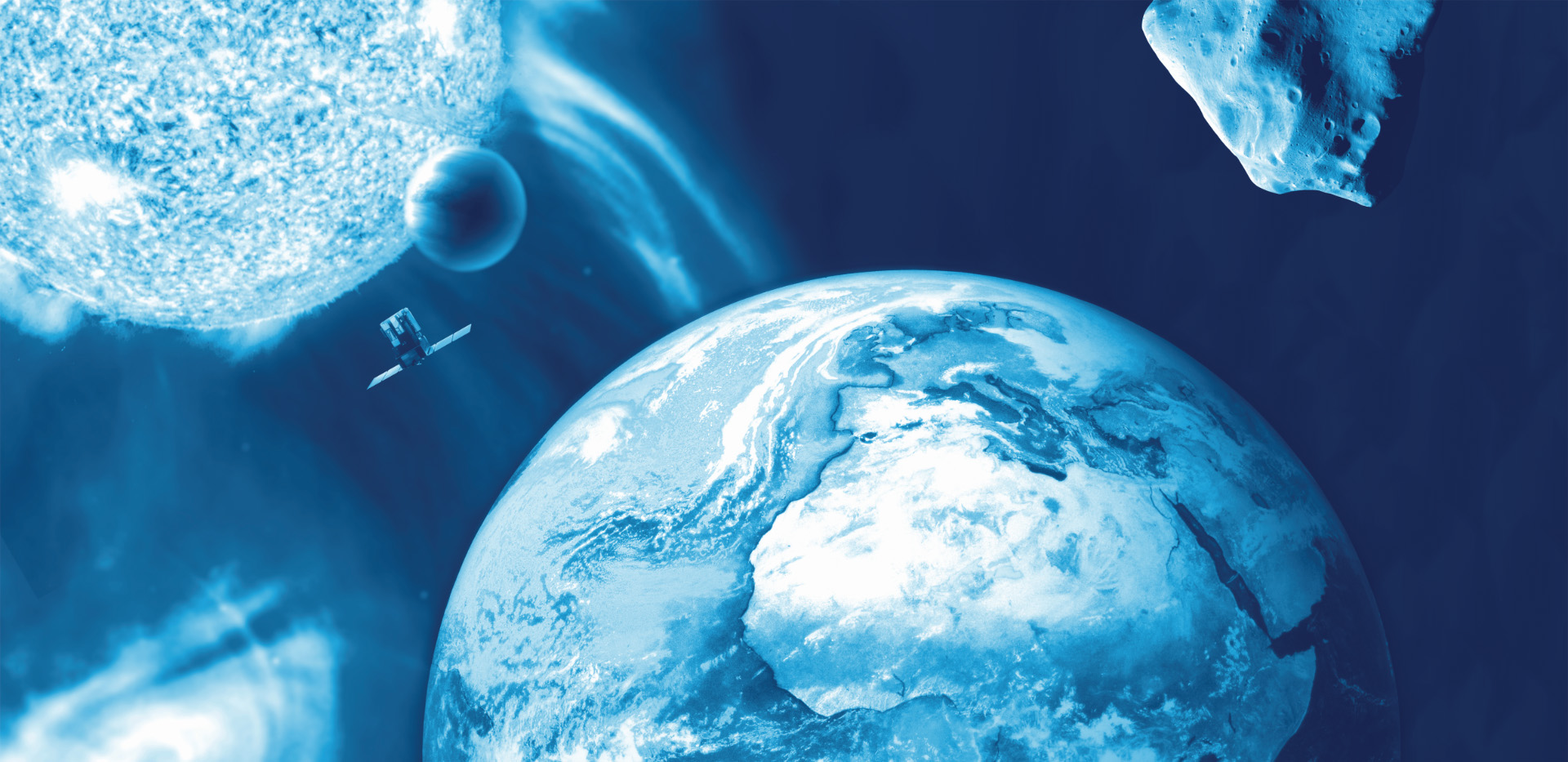
Detecting space hazards: ESA's graphic for the Space Situational Awareness programme

The Space Safety Programme (S2P), formerly the Space Situational Awareness (SSA) programme, is an initiative by the European Space Agency (ESA) to monitor hazards from space, determine their risk, make this data available to the appropriate authorities, and where possible, mitigate the threat. The programme focuses on 3 areas: space weather forecasting and nowcasting, asteroid impact prediction and prevention, and space debris mitigation. S2P is being implemented as an optional ESA programme with financial participation from 14 Member States.

== History ==
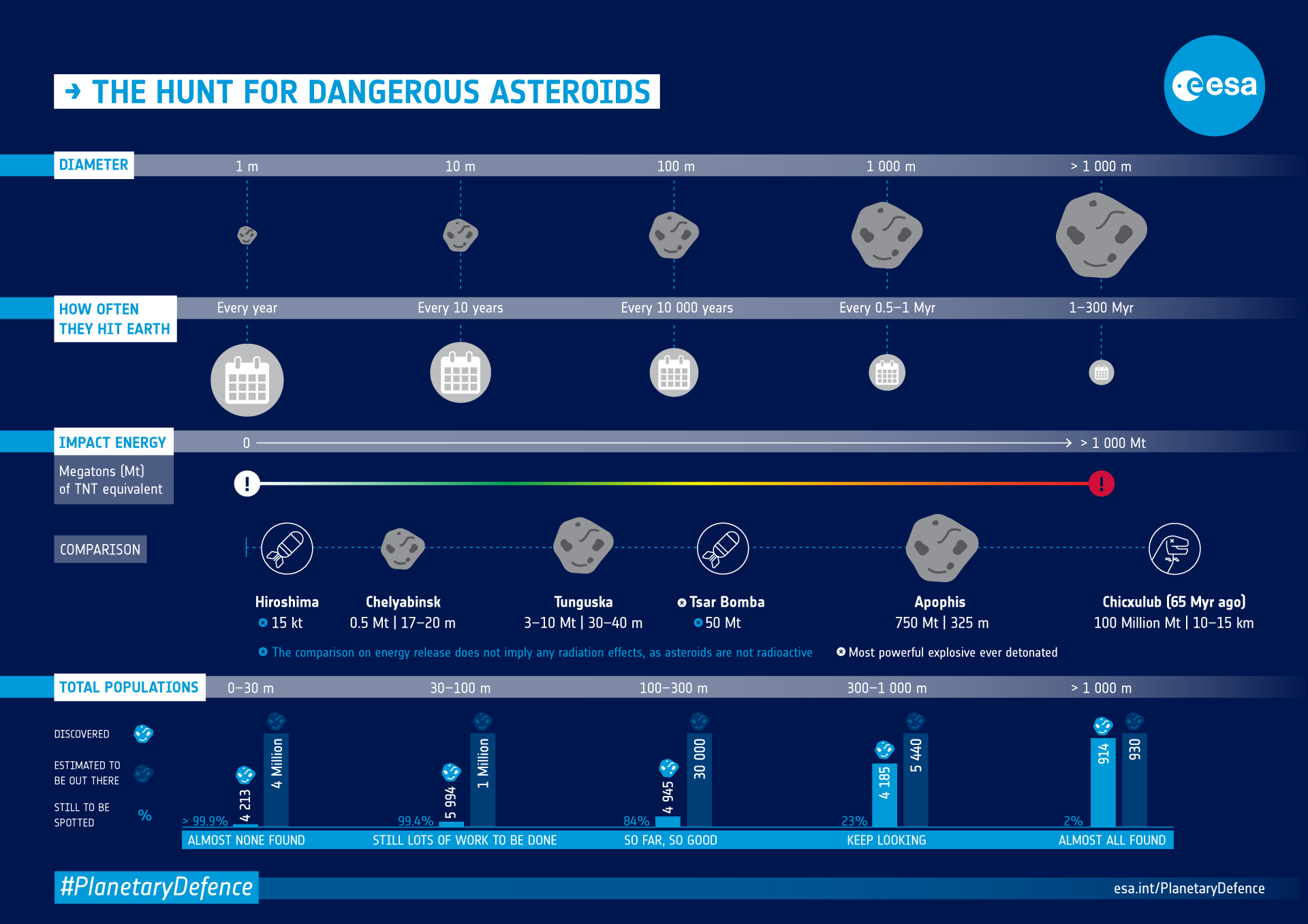
Asteroid danger explained

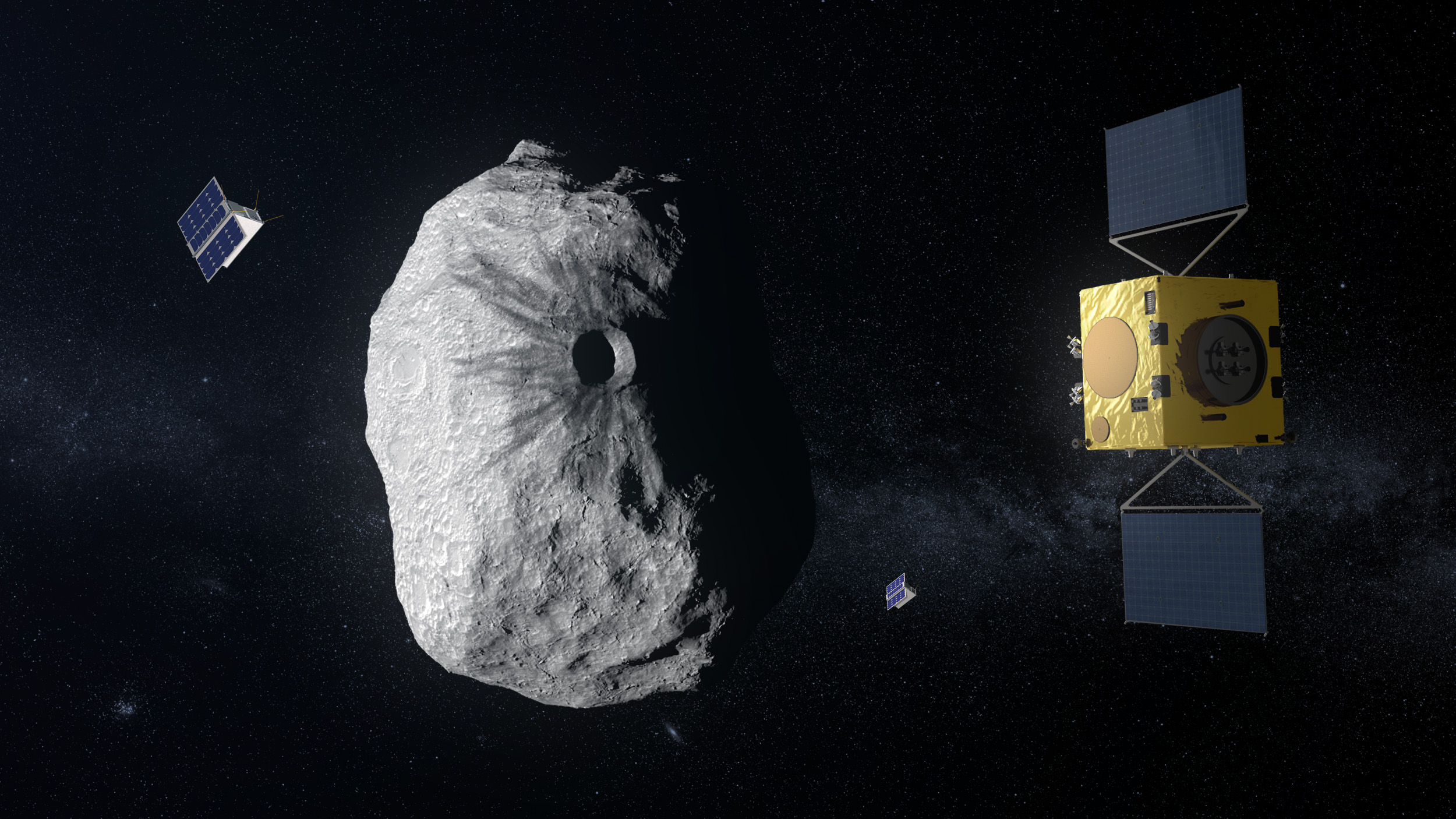
Artist's impression of Hera in orbit around Didymos

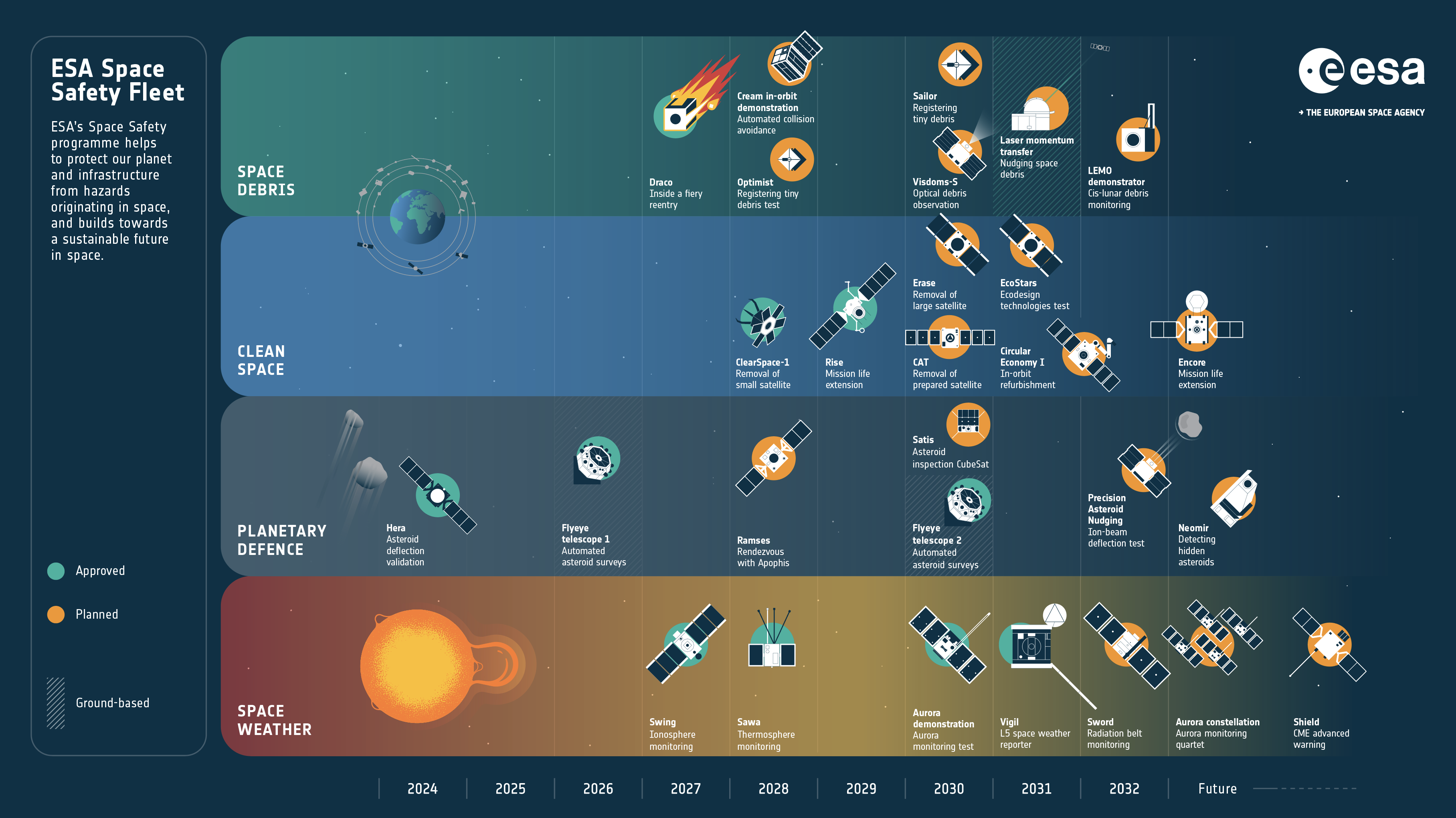
ESA Space Safety Fleet proposed and approved at 2025 Ministerial Council

The programme started in 2009 and its mandate was extended until 2019. The second phase of the programme received €46.5 million for the 2013–2016 period. The original SSA Programme was designed to support Europe's independent space access and utilization through the timely and accurate information delivery regarding the space environment, particularly hazards to both in-orbit and ground infrastructure. In 2019 it evolved into the present Space Safety Programme (S2P) with an expanded focus, also including missions and activities to mitigate and prevent dangers from space.

At the ESA ministerial council in 2025, member states committed to a budget of €955 million for S2P over the following three years, increasing the budget by 30%. These funds were even higher than what the programme requested and covered all plans outlined in the proposal published before the council. In 2025, IAU approved the naming of 10 asteroids after people and places connected with ESA's planetary defense projects.

== Structure ==
The programme is split into three "Cornerstones" managing major missions and six "COSMIC" areas managing small missions and other aspects of the programme:

=== Space Weather Cornerstone ===
S2P's space weather projects are monitoring the activity of the Sun, the solar wind, and Earth's magnetosphere, ionosphere, and thermosphere, that can affect spaceborne and ground-based infrastructure or endanger human life or health. This data is processed and made available freely via the Space Weather Service Network. The upcoming deep-space mission Vigil, designed to observe the Sun from the Sun-Earth Lagrange point L_{5}, will contribute to this monitoring system, allowing for timely warnings.

=== Planetary Defence Cornerstone ===
Planetary Defence at ESA focuses on detecting natural objects, such as asteroids and comets, which can potentially impact Earth, gathering observations from telescopes around the world and plotting their path through the sky to calculate the impact risk. Another area of the Cornerstone's activity is coordinating the response to a possible impactor with the international community through groups such as the International Asteroid Warning Network (IAWN) and the Space Mission Planning Advisory Group (SMPAG). The European asteroid observation network is coordinated by the S2P's Near-Earth Object Coordination Centre (NEOCC).

In October 2024, ESA launched the Hera mission, a follow-up to NASA's DART mission which performed the first kinetic impact test of Planetary Defence on 26 September 2022. Hera will rendezvous with the impacted Didymos binary asteroid system in 2026 to study the crater formed, the dust plume released, and more. S2P is working on another asteroid exploration mission, the Hera-derived Ramses and developing the asteroid-detecting space telescope named NEOMIR that will be placed in the Sun–Earth Lagrange point L_{1}.

=== ADRIOS Cornerstone ===
The Active Debris Removal & In-Orbit Servicing (ADRIOS) Cornerstone supports development of technologies for space debris removal and on-orbit servicing of satellites for sustainable use of space. The ADRIOS Cornerstone is developing the CApTure Payload Bay (CAT) and RISE missions.

Space debris projects at ESA are tracking active and inactive satellites and space debris to better understand the debris environment, providing data, analysis, and advice to spacecraft engineers to perform collision avoidance manoeuvres, as well as developing a system of automated collision avoidance. The space debris office also works with the international community on norms and standards for the sustainable future of space.

Clean Space projects aim for systematically considering the entire life-cycle of space activities, from the early stages of conceptual design to the mission's end of life and beyond, to removal of space debris. ESA Clean Space includes EcoDesign (embedding environmental sustainability within space mission design), management of end-of-life, developing technologies to prevent the creation of future debris, in-orbit servicing/active debris removal, removing spacecraft from orbit, and demonstrating in-orbit servicing of spacecraft.

=== COSMIC areas ===
The "COSMIC" areas aim to develop and support:

- Space weather services
- Space weather sensors
- Asteroid impact prediction
- Technologies for increased space traffic
- Clean and zero space debris future
- Competitiveness

Earth-orbiting space weather missions like SWING, SAWA, Aurora, and SWORD will form the Distributed Space Weather Sensor System (D3S) complementing the deep-space observations by Vigil. ESA is also supporting development of new terrestrial solar monitoring stations, e.g. the Radio Observations of the Solar Indicative Emissions (ROSIE) station in Białków, Poland.

ESA is building the Flyeye network of automated ground-based telescopes to scan the sky every night for Near Earth Object (NEO) detection. The first telescope, built on Sicily, had its first light in 2025.

The Draco mission will study the process of satellite breakup during uncontrolled atmospheric reentry. The first mission to remove a piece of space debris from orbit will be the ESA-commissioned ClearSpace-1.

ESA is also testing laser-based technologies for precise tracking, and possibly also remote deflection, of space debris at Izaña-1 and Izaña-2 laser-ranging stations at Teide Observatory on Tenerife. The laser deflection system, named OMLET (Orbit Maintenance via Laser MomEntum Transfer), is expected to become operational in 2031.

== Space missions ==
=== 2020s ===
- Hera, launched October 2024 – European asteroid probe aimed at studying the effects of a NEO's impact created by NASA's DART mission using 65803 Didymos's moon (Dimorphos) as a target
- Draco, launching in 2027 – small space capsule monitoring the breakup and demise processes of a re-entering satellite
- SWING, launching in 2027 – ionosphere monitoring mission
- PRELUDE, launching in 2027 – in-orbit demonstration of space manoeuvres and relative navigation technologies for active debris removal
- Ramses, launching in April 2028 – mission to the near-Earth asteroid Apophis
- SAWA, launching in 2028 – thermosphere monitoring mission
- CREAM in-orbit demonstration, launching in 2028 – automated collision avoidance demonstration mission
- Optimist, launching in 2028 – registering tiny space debris test
- RISE, launching in 2029 – in-orbit servicing demonstration mission

=== 2030s ===
- Aurora-D & Aurora-C, first launch planned for 2030 – a demonstrator satellite and a satellite constellation for Auroral oval monitoring
- ClearSpace-1, launching in 2030 – space debris removal demonstration mission, superseded the cancelled e.Deorbit
- SAILOR, launch planned for 2030 – space debris monitoring satellites using solar sail-like foils as impact detectors
- Visdoms-S, launch planned for 2030 – optical observation of space debris
- Satis, launch planned for 2030 – cubesat mission to an asteroid
- CAT (CApTure Payload Bay), launch planned for 2030 – joint ESA-AEE mission to test a standardised docking interface for satellite removal
- Erase, launch planned for 2030 – removal of a large satellite
- Vigil, launch planned for 2031 – space weather mission to the Sun-Earth Lagrange point L_{5}
- Ecostars, launch planned for 2031 – Ecodesign technologies test
- Circular Economy I, launch planned for 2031 – in-orbit refurbishment mission
- LEMO demonstrator, launch planned for 2032 – cis-lunar debris monitoring mission
- Precision Asteroid Nudging, launch planned for 2032 – ion-beam asteroid deflection test
- Sword, launch planned for 2032 – two satellites in GTO-like orbit monitoring Earth's radiation belts
- NEOMIR, launch planned for 2030s – asteroid-detecting space telescope in the Sun-Earth Lagrange point L_{1}
- Shield, launch planned for 2030s – CME advanced warning mission
- Encore, launch planned for 2030s – mission life extension

== Former SSA programme (2009–2019) ==
=== Space weather segment ===
The main objective of the space weather segment (SWE) was to detect and forecast of space weather events, avoid adverse effect on European space assets and ground-based infrastructure. To achieve that, the segment focused on delivery of real-time space weather information, forecasts and warnings, supported by a data archive, applications and services. Assets available for the segment consisted of multiple ground-based and spaceborne sensors monitoring the Sun, solar wind and Earth's magnetosphere, ionosphere and thermosphere. These included the PROBA2 satellite and the Kanzelhoehe Solar Observatory. The segment was jointly coordinated by the SWE Data Centre located at the ESTRACK Redu Station and the SSA Space Weather Coordination Centre (SSCC), both in Belgium.

=== Near-Earth object segment ===
The near-Earth object segment aimed to deliver monitoring and warning of potential Earth impactors and tracking of newly discovered objects. The segment's assets consisted of a mixture of professional and amateur telescopes, including the OGS Telescope, that were supported by tracking databases. The plans were to create a fully integrated system supporting alerts for civil authorities, including the Flyeye (NEOSTEL) telescope planned for completion in 2020. The segment was operated by the SSA NEO Coordination Centre located at the ESA Centre for Earth Observation, Italy.

=== Space surveillance and tracking segment ===
The SST segment's primary goal was the detection, cataloguing and orbit prediction of objects orbiting the Earth. It was part of an effort to avoid collisions between orbiting satellites and debris, provide safe reentries, detect on-orbit explosions, assist missions at launch, deployment and end-of-life and overall reduce cost of space access. The segment relied on existing European radar and optical systems. Some of its assets were existing radio and optical telescopes, serving a secondary role for tracking space debris.

The radar-based SST assets were split into two categories: surveillance and tracking systems. SSA SST radar systems included:

- Surveillance
  - Northern Cross transient radio telescope located at the Medicina Radio Observatory, serving as a receiver in bistatic radar system
  - RAF Fylingdales's three face AN/FPS-132 Upgraded Early Warning phased array radar, serving as a monostatic system
  - French Air Force bistatic radar-based space surveillance system GRAVES
- Tracking
  - CAMRa 25-meter steerable parabolic dish S-band radar located at the Chilbolton Observatory
  - EISCAT scatter radar capable of 3D monitoring of the atmosphere and ionosphere
  - TIRA 34-meter parabolic dish with an L-band tracking radar and a Ku-band imaging radar

SSA SST optical surveillance and tracking assets included:

- Surveillance
  - OLS telescope at the Observatorio Astronómico de Mallorca
  - Starbrook and Starbrook north located at Troodos Station
  - Fabra-ROA telescope (TFRM) at Serra del Montsec
  - ZimSMART robotic telescope
- Tracking
  - Satellite laser ranging station Graz at Lustbühel Observatory
  - Matera Laser Ranging Observatory (MLRO) in Italy
  - OGS Telescope at the Teide Observatory
  - TAROT and TAROT-South robotic telescope at the La Silla Observatory
  - ZIMLAT telescope at the Zimmerwald Observatory
  - ESA Flyeye Telescope at Sicily, Italy

As part of the SSA Programme new, dedicated surveillance radar supported by optical sensors systems were planned to be developed. The segment was coordinated by the Space Surveillance Test & Validation (SSTC) Centre located at the ESAC in Spain. Close approaches of Near-Earth objects and near earth asteroids were reported by ESA through the space situational awareness center.

== See also ==
- Kessler syndrome
- United States Space Surveillance Network
- List of European Space Agency programmes and missions

== Links ==
- esa.int/Space_Safety
- ESA Space Safety Fleet
