= Kanzelhoehe Solar Observatory =

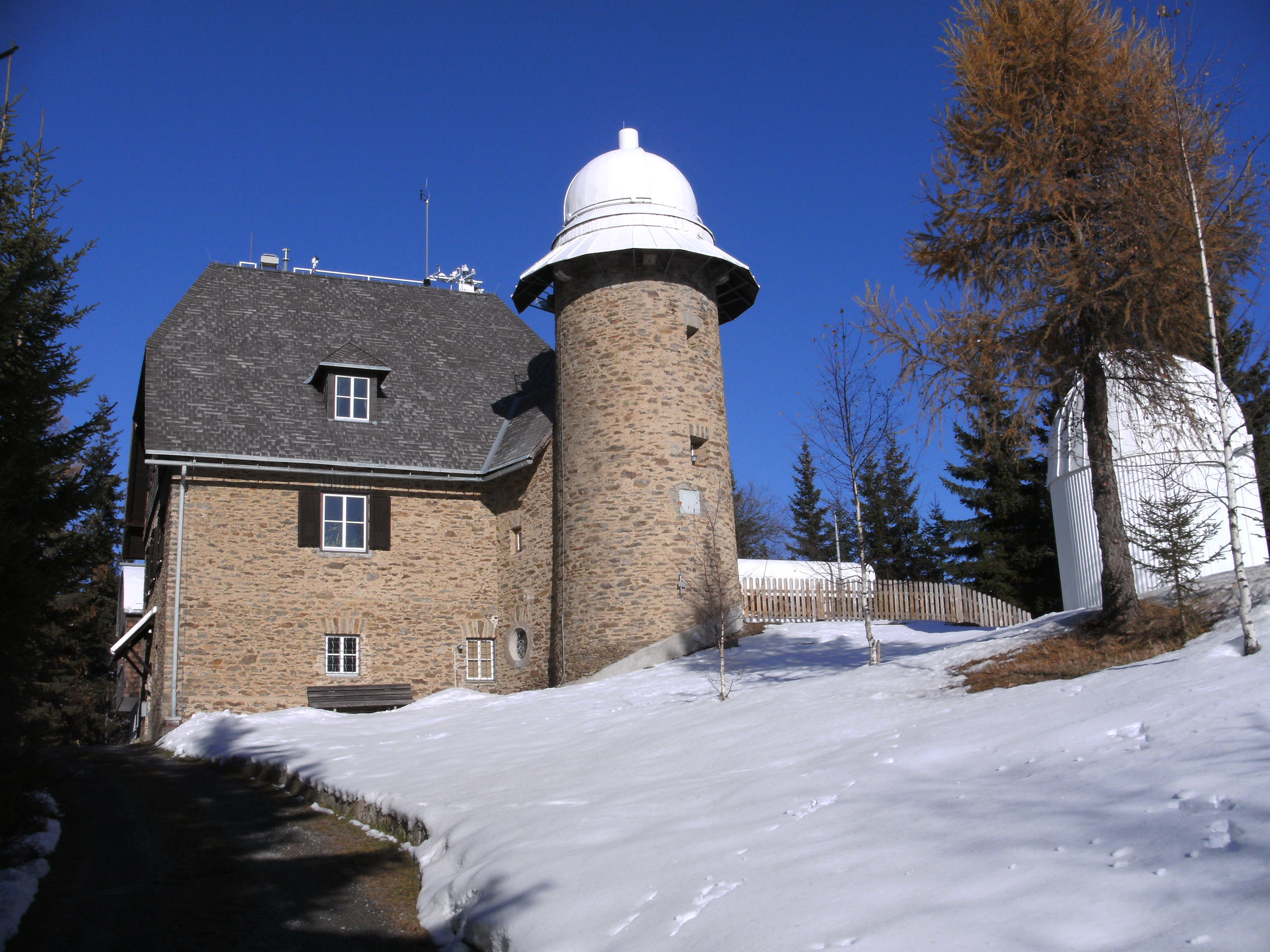
- Alternative names: Kanzelhoehe_Solar_Observatory
- Organization: Karl-Franzens-University
- Location: Villach, Austria
- Coordinates: 46°40.7′0″N 13°54.4′0″E
- Altitude: 1,526 m (5,007 ft)
- Website: www.kso.ac.at
- Related media on Commons

The Kanzelhoehe Solar Observatory or KSO is an astronomical observatory affiliated with the Institute of Geophysics, Astrophysics and Meteorology out of the University of Graz. It is located near Villach on the southern border of Austria.

Its Web page usually posts current images of the sun, especially in the hydrogen-alpha line that is the strongest visible-light line of hydrogen and that reveals the solar chromosphere.

== History ==
Founded in 1941 by the German Luftwaffe to research the effects of the Sun on the Earth's ionosphere, the KSO focuses on multispectral synoptic observations of the sun using several telescope on the same mount.

== Climate ==
Climate data for Kanzelhoehe: 1520m (1991−2020 normals, 1981−2010 snowfall)
Month	Jan	Feb	Mar	Apr	May	Jun	Jul	Aug	Sep	Oct	Nov	Dec	Year
Record high °C (°F)	15.7 (60.3)	14.0 (57.2)	15.6 (60.1)	21.2 (70.2)	26.1 (79.0)	29.4 (84.9)	30.7 (87.3)	31.3 (88.3)	25.4 (77.7)	20.6 (69.1)	17.0 (62.6)	13.6 (56.5)	31.3 (88.3)
Mean daily maximum °C (°F)	0.4 (32.7)	1.0 (33.8)	4.2 (39.6)	8.6 (47.5)	13.4 (56.1)	17.8 (64.0)	19.0 (66.2)	18.7 (65.7)	14.1 (57.4)	8.8 (47.8)	4.3 (39.7)	0.8 (33.4)	9.3 (48.7)
Daily mean °C (°F)	−2.6 (27.3)	−2.3 (27.9)	0.7 (33.3)	4.5 (40.1)	9.2 (48.6)	13.0 (55.4)	14.8 (58.6)	14.7 (58.5)	10.1 (50.2)	6.1 (43.0)	1.6 (34.9)	−1.9 (28.6)	5.7 (42.2)
Mean daily minimum °C (°F)	−5.4 (22.3)	−5.9 (21.4)	−2.8 (27.0)	0.7 (33.3)	4.7 (40.5)	8.5 (47.3)	9.9 (49.8)	10.0 (50.0)	6.3 (43.3)	2.6 (36.7)	−1.0 (30.2)	−4.4 (24.1)	1.9 (35.5)
Record low °C (°F)	−18.9 (−2.0)	−22.6 (−8.7)	−19.8 (−3.6)	−12.3 (9.9)	−4.6 (23.7)	−1.6 (29.1)	1.2 (34.2)	1.0 (33.8)	−3.2 (26.2)	−11.8 (10.8)	−15.4 (4.3)	−21.2 (−6.2)	−22.6 (−8.7)
Average precipitation mm (inches)	36.1 (1.42)	48.8 (1.92)	56.2 (2.21)	82.8 (3.26)	109.4 (4.31)	131.4 (5.17)	149.7 (5.89)	161.7 (6.37)	131.1 (5.16)	112.6 (4.43)	99.2 (3.91)	64.1 (2.52)	1,183.1 (46.57)
Average snowfall cm (inches)	37 (15)	48 (19)	58 (23)	39 (15)	8 (3.1)	1 (0.4)	0 (0)	0 (0)	1 (0.4)	14 (5.5)	44 (17)	60 (24)	310 (122.4)
Source: Central Institute for Meteorology and Geodynamics

== See also ==
- List of astronomical observatories
