= Posidonia (disambiguation) =

Posidonia is a genus of seagrasses.

"Posidonia" may also refer to:

- Posidonia (band), an Italian band, formed in Turin
- Paestum, a Greek city in Italy, sometimes called "Posidonia" or "Poseidonia"
- Poseidonia or Posidonia, a village on the island of Syros (Greece)
- Posidonia Shale, a geological formation from the Lower Jurassic
- Posidonia an extinct genus of ostreoidean bivalve from the Paleozoic and Mesozoic
- Posidònia (satellite), a Spanish Earth observation satellite

== See also ==
- Poseidonia (disambiguation)
- Poseidon (disambiguation)
- Posidon
