= School of Physics and Astronomy, University of Leicester =

University department

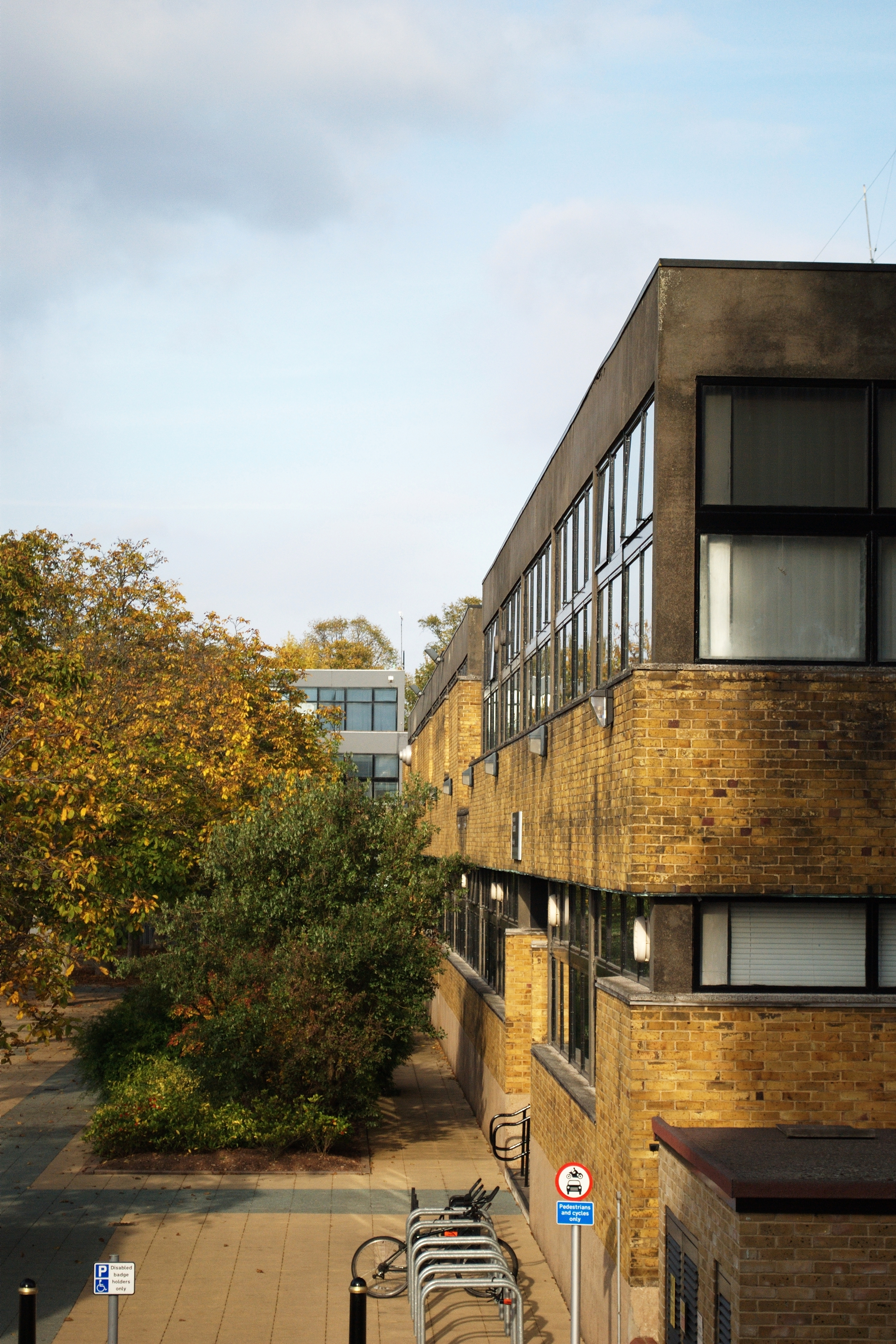
- Established: 1924
- Location: Leicester, United Kingdom
- Website: le.ac.uk/physics

The School of Physics and Astronomy is an academic department of the University of Leicester, England, specialising in research and teaching in physics, astrophysics, and space science. It is based at the University's main campus in Leicester, with additional facilities at Space Park Leicester.

== History ==
The study of physics at the University of Leicester began in the 1920s, when the institution admitted its first small cohort of students under a single lecturer. A separate Department of Astronomy was established in 1965, and in 1973 the two departments jointly introduced one of the United Kingdom's first combined honours degrees in Physics with Astrophysics.

The University's involvement in space science started in 1961 with the launch of its first instrument on a Skylark rocket. Notable alumni from the early decades of the School include author C. P. Snow and optics pioneer Harold Hopkins. From 1967 onwards, at least one piece of Leicester-built hardware has been operating in space in any given year. In 2025 the School marked its centenary, by which time it had expanded to more than 650 students, around 45 academic staff, and over 100 research, technical, and administrative staff. Former and present staff include three former presidents of the Royal Astronomical Society.

In 1994, the University of Leicester celebrated winning the Queen's Anniversary Prize for its work in Physics & Astronomy. The prize citation reads: "World-class teaching, research and consultancy programme in astronomy and space and planetary science fields. Practical results from advanced thinking".

The School of Physics and Astronomy played a central role in the creation of the National Space Centre in Leicester, which opened in 2001. The idea for a public space science facility was developed during the 1990s in collaboration between the University, Leicester City Council, and local industry. Staff from the School contributed scientific expertise, educational input, and exhibit development, helping to establish the Centre as a national hub for space science outreach and engagement.

In 2012, the university was selected as one of four sites for national high performance computing facilities for theoretical astrophysics and particle physics. An investment of £12.32 million, from the Government's Large Facilities Capital Fund, together with investment from the Science and Technology Facilities Council and from universities contribute to a national supercomputer. The university currently hosts the Data Intensive At Leicester super computer as part of the DiRAC UK super computing facility.

== Research ==
The school includes four research groups:

- Astrophysics—Focuses on both observational and theoretical studies across the electromagnetic spectrum. Research includes transient phenomena, galaxy formation and evolution, variable stars, supernovae, and exoplanet detection. The group contributes to international projects such as the Neil Gehrels Swift Observatory, NGTS, GOTO, JWST, CTA, XMM-Newton, SVOM, and ESA's NewAthena. Theoretical work emphasizes accretion physics, stellar dynamics, and cosmic evolution, supported by high-performance computing via the UK's DiRAC facility.
- Planetary Science—Investigates the environments of planets, including atmospheres, magnetospheres, ionospheres, surface conditions, and planetary materials. The group combines instrumentation development for planetary missions, ground-based planetary astronomy, and theoretical modelling across the Solar System. The group's contributions include designing and building the Raman Laser Spectrometer for ESA's Rosalind Franklin rover; leading the development of the Mercury Imaging X-ray Spectrometer aboard the ESA–JAXA BepiColombo mission to Mercury; serving as the UK's only formal co-investigator on NASA's Juno mission to Jupiter; and participating in ESA's JUICE mission to Jupiter's icy moons.
- Space Projects and Instrumentation—Specialises in developing instruments for space science missions. The group is based at Space Park Leicester and includes academic, engineering, technical, and support staff. It has maintained an unbroken record of delivering operational instruments to space for over 60 years. Recent projects include the building of an X-ray telescope for the SMILE space mission.
- Earth Observation Science—Studies the natural environment to address environmental challenges such as climate change, air pollution, and land-surface changes. The group combines modelling and remote-sensing technologies across satellites, airborne campaigns, and ground-based observations, hosting a high-resolution spectroscopy facility and a sun-photometer site. Earth Observation Science leads several international projects, such as the European Space Agency's Land Surface Temperature project. Staff work alongside the National Centre for Earth Observation, which is hosted at Space Park Leicester.

== Teaching ==
Each year the school admits approximately 100-120 undergraduates for courses in Physics, or one of four specialist pathways (Astrophysics, Space Science, Climate Science, Data Science). As is standard in England and Wales, three-year BSc and four-year MPhys degrees are available. The School also runs a STEM Foundation Year.

The school teaches a 1-year MSc postgraduate degree in space exploration systems, and admits around 10 funded PhD students per year to work within its four research groups.
