= CCSDS MO Services =

The Spacecraft Monitoring & Control (SM&C) Working Group of the Consultative Committee for Space Data Systems (CCSDS), which sees the active participation of 10 space agencies and of the Space Domain Task Force of the Object Management Group (OMG), is defining a service oriented architecture consisting of a set of standard end-to-end services between functions resident on board a spacecraft or based on the ground, that are responsible for mission operations.

The CCSDS Mission Operations (MO) Services provides a set of standard operations services for the day-to-day operation of space assets and are outlined in the CCSDS Mission Operations Services Concept.

== Service Definition ==
Each service is defined in terms of an information model that defines a set of object types that are shared by providers and consumers of the service. Examples of such object types are status parameters, control actions and notification alerts, orbit vectors, schedules, planning requests and software images.

In addition to definition of the static information model, the service defines the interactions (through extension of the patterns defined in the Message Abstraction Layer) required between service provider and consumer to allow:

- the service consumer to observe the status of objects through a flow of update messages;
- the service consumer to invoke operations upon the objects.

The specification of an MO service defines the structure of the objects, however, each deployment (or instantiation) of a service will also require service configuration data that defines the actual instances of those object types that exist for that service instance. For example, the M&C service may define what parameters, actions and alerts are, but it is the associated service configuration data that specifies the set of parameters, actions and alerts that exist for a particular spacecraft.

== Identified Mission Operations Services ==
The following table lists the application-level Mission Operations services that have currently been identified by the working group. It is to be stressed, however, that the service framework is designed to be extensible and additional services may be identified in the future to address additional requirements for end-to-end interaction in mission operations.

Name	Service Objects and Operations
Monitoring & Control	Parameters: monitor status Actions [Commands]: monitor status; precheck; invoke Alerts [Events]: raise; request state; monitor occurrence
Time	Time: report; set; correlate; notify
Software Management	On-board Software: load; dump
Automation	Procedure/Function: control; progress reporting
Scheduling	Schedule: distribute; edit; control; progress reporting
Planning Request	Planning Request/Goal: request; response
Data Product Management	Data Product [Payload Data File]: directory; transfer
Navigation	Position: tracking, ranging, onboard positioning Orbit/Attitude/Predicted Events: determination, propagation, manoeuvre preparation
Remote Buffer Management	Buffer: catalogue; retrieve; clear

NOTE – Services are listed together with a summary of the associated Service Objects and Operations.

== See also ==
- NanoSat MO Framework
