= Poseidonia (disambiguation) =

Poseidonia is a village and a former municipality on the island of Syros, Cyclades, Greece.

Poseidonia may also refer to:

== Places ==
- Poseidonia, Isthmus of Corinth, Greece, a harbour on the western end of the Corinth Canal
- Poseidonia (Magna Graecia), a ruined Ancient Greek and Roman city in southern Italy
- Basaidu, a village in Hormozgan, Iran
- Poseidonia, a mythical name for Athens from the Ancient Greek myth The Gift of Athena, the myth of the founding of Athens

== Other uses ==
- An Ancient Greek festival celebrating the sea god Poseidon
- The realm of the Ancient Greek sea god Poseidon
- Posidonia, a sea grass genus, also called Poseidonia
- Thambemyia poseidonia, species of fly, also called Conchopus poseidonius
- Innisfallen (ship) (1948), a ship named Poseidonia from 1967 to 1985
- MV Ulster Queen (1967), a ship named Poseidonia from 1988 to 2005

== See also ==
- Posidonia (disambiguation)
- Poseidon (disambiguation)
