= NCEO =

NCEO may refer to:

- National Center for Employee Ownership, American organization promoting employee ownership of businesses
- National Centre for Earth Observation, part of the Natural Environment Research Council
- National Confederation of Employers' Organisations, former name of the British Employers' Confederation
