= AGSA Lab =

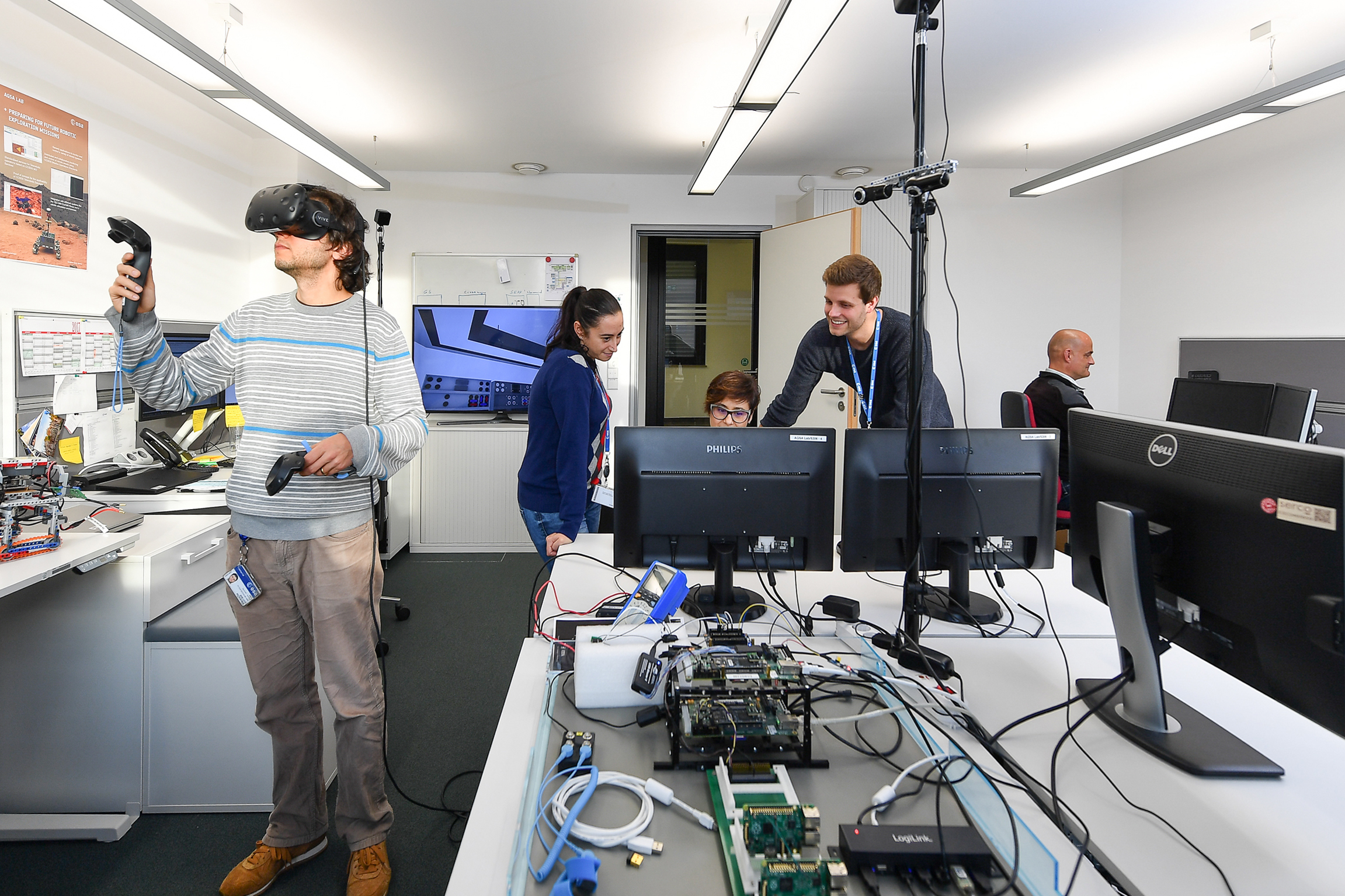
- AGSA Lab
- Established: 2014; 12 years ago
- Field of research: Space Technology, Software, Space Ground Systems
- Location: Darmstadt, Germany
- Website: AGSA Lab

The Advanced Ground Software Applications Laboratory (AGSA Lab) at the European Space Agency has the objective of investigating and prototyping advanced software concepts and technologies that enable the evolution of mission data systems for future space missions.

The AGSA Lab is part of the Mission Operations Data Systems Division at the European Space Operations Centre which has experts who design, develop, test, and maintain data systems dedicated to space missions such as Mission Control Systems, Mission Planning and Simulator systems. The focus of the AGSA Lab is on CubeSats, robotic exploration missions, human exploration, and new space standards for mission operations.

These new software technologies that are being developed at the AGSA Lab can be used for Science, Earth Observation and Navigation missions.

== Lab capabilities ==
The AGSA Lab currently provides facilities such as:

- CubeSat engineering facilities - A generic flatsat flight engineering model for simulation, integration and validation
- Robotic engineering facilities - For testing and validation of Robotic Data Systems
- Augmented and Virtual Reality Simulation environment - For human exploration scenarios
- Private cloud environment - For automatic application deployment

== Ground software applications ==
The AGSA Lab currently maintains the following software:

- NanoSat MO Framework
- EUD4MO
- Data Systems for the METERON project
- Applications for AR/VR
