= Phi-Sat-2 =

Earth observation satellite mission

ɸ-Sat-2
- Names: ɸ-Sat-2, Phi-Sat-2
- Mission type: Technological Demonstrator / Earth Observation
- Operator: ESA
- Website: Phsat-2

Spacecraft properties
- Bus: 6U CubeSat
- Manufacturer: Open Cosmos, CGI, Ubotica, Simera CH Innovative, CEiiA, GEO-K and KP Labs
- Dimensions: approx. 100 mm × 200 mm × 300 mm (3.9 in × 7.9 in × 11.8 in)

Start of mission
- Launch date: August 16, 2024
- Rocket: Falcon 9
- Launch site: Vandenberg, California, US
- Contractor: SpaceX

Orbital parameters
- Regime: Low Earth
- Inclination: Sun-synchronous orbit (SSO)

Phi-Sat-2 (also known as ɸ-Sat-2) is an Earth observation CubeSat mission from the European Space Agency (ESA) capable of running AI apps directly on board. What makes Phi-Sat-2 particularly noteworthy is its utilization of the NanoSat MO Framework, a modular and open-source platform designed for small satellite missions.

The NanoSat MO Framework enhances the satellite's flexibility and adaptability, allowing for efficient integration of AI technologies into its operational workflow through Apps that can be installed on board. The AI Apps will be able to do different activities such as transforming a satellite image to a street map, detecting clouds, detect and classify maritime vessels, and to perform image compression using AI.

== Mission Consortium ==
The ɸ-Sat-2 mission consortium is composed of the following companies:

- Open Cosmos
- CGI
- Ubotica
- Simera CH Innovative
- CEiiA
- GEO-K
- KP Labs

== Spacecraft Payload ==
The mission includes the following payload devices:

- On-board Computer from Open Cosmos
- Multi-spectral Optical Camera from Simera CH Innovative (expected 4.75 m ground resolution)
- AI processor: Intel Movidius Myriad 2 from Ubotica

The AI technology used in the mission is based on the Intel Movidius Myriad 2 vision processing unit, which is designed to provide high-performance, low-power processing for computer vision applications. The Myriad 2 is integrated into the spacecraft and is used to process and analyze the images captured by the hyperspectral camera in near real-time. The AI processor was already adopted on the previous Phi-Sat-1 mission.

== See also ==
- Phi-Sat-1
- OPS-SAT
- Phi Lab
- List of CubeSats
