= NanoMagSat =

European satellite mission

- Names: Scout 3
- Mission type: Earth observation satellite
- Operator: European Space Agency
- Website: nanomagsat.fr
- Mission duration: 3 years (planned)

Spacecraft properties
- Bus: 3x 16U CubeSat
- Manufacturer: (United Kingdom) Open Cosmos

Start of mission
- Launch date: 2027 (planned)

Orbital parameters
- Reference system: Geocentric
- Altitude: 545 km
- ESA insingia FutureEO FutureEO: Scout missions

NanoMagSat (Scout 3) is a future satellite constellation under development by the European Space Agency (ESA) for the study of Earth's magnetic field and ionosphere.

== Overview ==
The mission will consist of three 16U CubeSats named Alpha, Bravo, and Charlie (A, B, and C) in low-Earth orbit at an altitude of 545 km, two at an inclination of 60° and one in polar orbit. Each satellite will be equipped with a long deployable boom carrying an absolute magnetometer at its end and a high-frequency magnetometer positioned midway along the boom. The body of each satellite will carry a multi-needle Langmuir Probe and two GNSS receivers. The satellites are being built by the UK-based company Open Cosmos and their first launch is expected in late 2027.

== See also ==
- List of European Space Agency programmes and missions
