= MANTIS (satellite) =

European Earth observation CubeSat

- Operator: (United Kingdom) Open Cosmos (United Kingdom) UK Space Agency; European Space Agency
- COSPAR ID: 2023-174B
- SATCAT no.: 58257

Spacecraft properties
- Spacecraft type: 12U CubeSat
- Manufacturer: Open Cosmos, Terrabotics, IngeniArs, Satlantis,

Start of mission
- Launch date: 11 November 2023, 18:49 UTC
- Rocket: Falcon 9 Transporter-9
- Launch site: Vandenberg Space Force Base

End of mission
- Decay date: 15 October 2025

Orbital parameters
- Reference system: Geocentric
- Regime: Sun-synchronous
- Altitude: 500 km

MANTIS was an Earth observation satellite developed by the UK-based company Open Cosmos with support of the European Space Agency (ESA) and the UK Space Agency (UKSA). The 12U CubeSat successfully demonstrated the integrated Standard Imager for Microsatellites (iSIM), a high-resolution multispectral imager designed for small satellites, as well as in-orbit data processing. MANTIS was the first space mission supported by ESA's InCubed programme managed by the agency's ɸ-lab. The satellite was launched on a Falcon 9 rocket on 11 November 2023, delivered its first Earth images on 20 November 2023, and completed its mission by safely deorbiting in October 2025. MANTIS was used in de-risking technologies for Atlantic Constellation Pathfinder, UKSA's contribution to the international Atlantic Constellation.

== See also ==
- List of European Space Agency programmes and missions
