= Phi-Sat-1 =

ESA satellite

ɸ-Sat-1
- Names: ɸ-Sat-1, Phi-Sat-1, PhiSat-1, ɸ-Sat, PhiSat, FSSCat
- Mission type: Technological demonstrator
- Operator: ESA
- COSPAR ID: 2020-061W
- SATCAT no.: 46292
- Website: ESA ɸ-Sat-1

Spacecraft properties
- Bus: 6U CubeSat
- Manufacturer: Universitat Politècnica de Catalunya, Spain
- Launch mass: ? kg
- Dimensions: approx. 100 mm × 200 mm × 300 mm (3.9 in × 7.9 in × 11.8 in)

Start of mission
- Launch date: 3 September 2020, 01:51:10 UTC
- Rocket: Vega rocket using the Small Spacecraft Mission Service (SSMS) dispenser
- Launch site: Centre Spatial Guyanais
- Contractor: Arianespace

Orbital parameters
- Regime: LEO
- Eccentricity: ~0
- Inclination: Sun-synchronous orbit (SSO)

Phi-Sat-1 (also known as ɸ-Sat-1) is a CubeSat mission from the European Space Agency (ESA) that uses Artificial Intelligence (AI) for Earth observation. The mission will collect a large number images from space in the visible, near-infrared and thermal-infrared parts of the electromagnetic spectrum, and then filter out the images which are covered with clouds using AI algorithms. This reduces the number of images to be downlinked from space and therefore improve efficiency. The Phi-Sat-1 mission has two main objectives:

- To acquire images in the visible, the near-infrared and thermal infrared regions
- Demonstration of AI inference engine for cloud detection demonstrating the capabilities of the Myriad chip

The mission was proposed by Spain's Universitat Politècnica de Catalunya and developed by a consortium of European companies and institutes. The idea was originally presented at the 2017 Copernicus Masters and was the overall winner.

== Payload and communications ==
The Phi-Sat-1 payload devices on-board of the satellite are:

- Hyperspectral/TIR optical payload - HyperScout®-2
- AI chip - Intel Movidius board with a Myriad II chip (VPU)

== AI Cloud Detection Experiment ==
The Phi-Sat-1 represents one of Europe's first artificial intelligence in space. The main task of the AI chip is to comb through huge sets of images (which will be used for the monitoring of vegetation changes and water quality) and filter out the ones of low quality due to cloud coverage. The AI chip will process large amounts of data which otherwise would be sent for processing on Earth. The main advantage is that the on-board processing makes the delivery more efficient as the "cloudy" images have already been removed.

The AI cloud detection experiment is aimed at validating the performance of the on-board inference engine based on a machine learning algorithm for cloud detection. The inference engine runs on a VPU embedded in the hyperspectral instrument and it will reduce the content of the downloaded data. One of the key issues for hyperspectral instruments in small satellite missions is to simultaneously lower costs while respecting on-board resources (power, mass, etc.) and at the same time to maximize the relevant information to be downlinked by the Ground Segment. Hyperspectral missions typically produced big amounts of information from the observed scenes, such as land, water and ice observations, but sometimes the data cannot be exploited due to the presence of clouds. For instance, more than 30% of the images in Sentinel-2 are cloudy.

== Launch ==
The satellite was scheduled to be launched on 17 August 2020. Launch of the Vega rocket occurred on 3 September 2020 from Europe's Spaceport in French Guiana carrying Phi-Sat-1 among 53 satellites on its new dispenser called the Small Spacecraft Mission Service (SSMS). This launch is a proof-of-concept flight to demonstrate and validate the SSMS, a new rideshare launch service for small satellites. The SSMS dispenser is lightweight and can be configured to meet the requirements of the missions. The SSMS can carry CubeSats with masses between 1 kg up to 500 kg.

== Follow-up Mission: ɸ-Sat-2 ==
At the opening of the ɸ-week in 2019, it was announced that a new Mission Challenge to develop ɸ-Sat-2 will be released. The ɸ-Sat-2 Mission Challenge was released in November 2019.

== See also ==
- List of CubeSats
- Phi Lab
