= Open Cosmos =

UK-based satellite mission provider

Open Cosmos Ltd
- Type: Private
- Industry: Aerospace engineering
- Founder: Rafal Jorda Siquier
- Headquarters: Harwell Science and Innovation Campus, United Kingdom
- Area served: Worldwide
- Number of employees: 300+ (June 2026)
- Website: www.open-cosmos.com

Open Cosmos is a satellite mission provider and microsatellite manufacturer, focusing on Earth Observation and satellite communication missions.

== History ==
Open Cosmos was founded by Rafal Jorda Siquier in 2015 with the stated aim of reducing the cost of access to space, and now operates bases in the UK, Spain, Portugal and Greece.

Open Cosmos has joined forces with Space Park Leicester to support in the development of the Elfen Project, which is a mission aimed at measuring the solar wind, and its effect on near-Earth space.

In September 2023, it was announced that Open Cosmos had raised $50 million in funding from backers ETF Partners, Trill Impact and A&G, along with smaller strategic investors, including Accenture Ventures.

In July 2025, Open Cosmos acquired Portuguese start-up, Connected, which focuses on 5G NB-IoT capabilities for space.

== Missions ==
- QB50: First Mission. Multi-point in-situ measurements of the lower Atmosphere.
- Enxaneta: Narrowband IoT mission with Sateliot
- LS2: IoT satellite for Lucuna Space, providing connectivity to ground sensors.
- DOVER: Pathfinder for GNSS-based positioning, navigation and timing (PNT) solution. (Lost in UK launched Virgin Orbit mission)
- Menut: Earth observation satellite focusing on the impact of climate change.
- ALISIO-1: 6U CubeSat. SWIR imager for environmental monitoring and a laser communications module for improved data transfer.
- PLATERO: Integrating Earth observation, internet of things and machine learning for enhanced environmental monitoring.
- MANTIS: Supported by ESA and UKSA, a 12U CubeSat, combining Earth observation and machine learning to address the challenges in the energy and mining sector
- HAMMER: 6U CubeSat, combining key technologies to deliver near real-time analysis and global coverage.
- Phi-Sat-2: European Space Agency mission, alongside CGI, Ubotica, Simera CH Innovative, CEiiA, GEO-K and KP Labs. 6U Cubesat designed to show how machine learning can advance Earth observation.
- 6GStarLab: 6U CubeSat for the evaluation of 6G communication frequencies using multi-frequency devices.
- NanoMagSat: (Launching 2027) European Space Agency mission consisting of 3 x 16U CubeSats, all carrying miniaturised absolute magnetometers mounted at the end of a boom.
- UK Atlantic Constellation Pathfinder: (Launch TBC) Ocean, Earth and Climate monitoring satellite, intended as a pathfinder towards the UK contribution to the Atlantic Constellation.
- ORPHEUS: (Launch TBC) Defence Science and Technology Laboratory (Dstl) announced that it had awarded the £5.15 million Orpheus mission contract to Astroscale UK, with Open Cosmos as a subcontractor and platform provider. This mission is the successor to the Prometheus-2 and CIRCE missions that were lost aboard the Virgin Orbit launch in 2023.
- Greek government constellation: (Launch TBC) Earth observation constellation to provide high-resolution imagery to the Greek government. Possibly refers to Hyperion GR (first launch in 2026).
- Posidònia: (launched in 2026) Earth observation satellite for the Balearic Islands
