= OPS-SAT =

Technology demonstration CubeSat

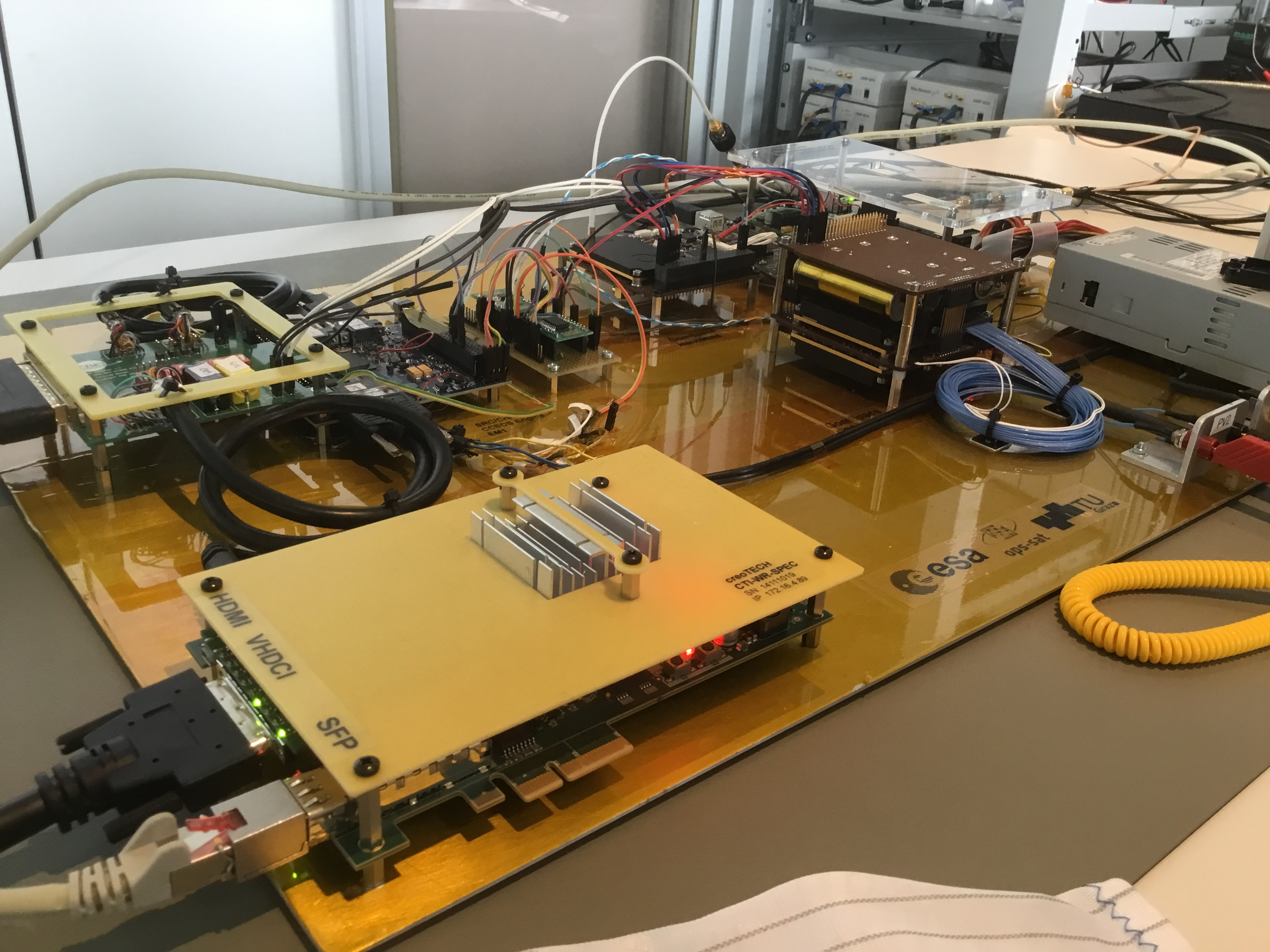
- Engineering model of OPS-SAT on a test bench
- Mission type: Technological demonstrator
- Operator: ESA
- SATCAT no.: 44878
- Website: www.esa.int/Our_Activities/Operations/OPS-SAT

Spacecraft properties
- Bus: 3U CubeSat
- Manufacturer: Graz University of Technology, Austria
- Launch mass: 7 kg
- Dimensions: 96 mm × 96 mm × 290 mm (3.8 in × 3.8 in × 11.4 in)

Start of mission
- Launch date: 18 December 2019
- Rocket: Soyuz VS23·
- Launch site: Centre Spatial Guyanais (Ensemble de Lancement Soyouz)
- Contractor: Arianespace·
- General Support Technology Programme (GSTP)

OPS-SAT was a CubeSat by the European Space Agency (ESA), intended to demonstrate the improvements in mission control capabilities that will arise when satellites can fly more powerful on-board computers. The mission had the objective to break the cycle of "has never flown, will never fly" in the area of satellite control. It was the first CubeSat operated directly by ESA.

The satellite had an experimental computer that is ten times more powerful than traditional ESA on-board computers. This on-board computer provided an experimental platform to run software experiments on board. One innovative concept was the deployment of space software in the form of apps. This concept was enabled by the NanoSat MO Framework (NMF) and allowed Apps to be uploaded to the spacecraft and then started on board. This was a new concept that ESA has successfully demonstrated in space.

OPS-SAT was launched at 08:54:20 UTC on 18 December 2019, exactly twenty-four hours later than originally planned. The satellite deorbited on 22 May 2024. During its descent, ESA collaborated with amateur radio enthusiasts to collect as much data as possible, observing the effects on the satellite as it passed through the Earth's lower atmosphere.

== Payload and communications ==
OPS-SAT provided an in-orbit test-bed environment for the deployment of different experiments to test new protocols, new algorithms, and new techniques. The satellite was designed to be robust and no single point of failure should exist, so that it was always possible to recover the spacecraft if something went wrong with one of the software experiments. The robustness of the basic satellite itself allowed ESA flight control teams to upload and try out new, innovative control software submitted by experimenters.

OPS-SAT payload devices:

- Experimental Platform: Critical Link MityARM 5CSX
- Fine ADCS
- GPS
- Camera
- Software-defined radio
- Optical Receiver

Communication links to ground:

- S band: CCSDS-compatible S-band communication: Syrlinks - EWC31
- X band: CNES funded X-band transmitter (payload of opportunity)
- UHF: Backup communications link

== Experimental Platform ==
The Experimental Platform of OPS-SAT was where experiments were executed. It had two Critical Link MityARM 5CSX in cold redundancy (if one failed, the second one was used). These had a Dual-core 800 MHz ARM Cortex-A9 processor, an Altera Cyclone V FPGA, 1 GB DDR3 RAM, and an external mass memory device with 8 GB.

- Linux
- Java
- CCSDS File Delivery Protocol (CFDP)
- NanoSat MO Framework

ESA's aim was to remove as many barriers to experimentation as possible. For example, there was little to no paperwork, ESOC's infrastructure was set up to do automated tests on the experiments, with the aim of reducing the overheads close to zero. Additionally, the experiments could be easily developed in form of apps using the NanoSat MO Framework.

== Awards ==
In March 2023, the OPS-SAT Mission Control Team was awarded with the International SpaceOps 2023 Award for Outstanding Achievement.

== OPS-SAT's Firsts ==
OPS-SAT achieved several significant firsts in various areas.

=== Operations ===
- First space mission dedicated to operational technology.
- First nanosatellite directly owned and operated by ESA.
- First in-orbit laboratory where the public can load and test software/firmware.
- First ESA mission directly controllable in real-time over the internet by the public.
- First mission to offer an on-board environment (NMF) that allows the easy development of apps for upload and execution, comparable to the concept of modern smartphones.
- First ESA mission to reconfigure an in-orbit FPGA on a daily basis.
- First mission commanded with Europe’s next-generation mission control system EGS-CC.
- First in-orbit decoding and processing of ground-based emergency beacons.
- First ground-to-space API access of an in-orbit hosted Software-as-a-Service (SaaS) application.

=== Artificial Intelligence ===
- First in-orbit neural network deployment for onboard AI.
- First onboard machine learning for in-orbit training of supervised and unsupervised models.
- First in-orbit AI model for FDIR.
- First European deep learning processing of an image using an on-board FPGA.
- First re-training of an on-board AI model with live in-flight data.
- First on-board update of an ANN (artificial neural network) in space in an institutional mission.
- First onboard Generative AI (WGANs).
- First re-use of pre-trained neural networks originally developed for terrestrial applications.

=== Protocols and Standards ===
- First ESA mission to use CFDP (CCSDS File Delivery Protocol) operationally.
- First ESA mission to use CCSDS Mission Operations Services (MO) on-board, on the space-to-ground link, and on ground.
- First in-orbit implementation of a Spacewire protocol on top of an existing LVDS connection.
- First mission to use the CCSDS Housekeeping Data Compression Standard 124.0-B-1 (based on POCKET+) on OPS-SAT-1.

=== Cybersecurity ===
- First post-Quantum KEM-TLS cryptographic solution demonstrated in-space.
- First in-orbit research platform for space cybersecurity.

=== Noteworthy ===
- First stock market transaction successfully performed in space.
- First in-orbit game of chess.
- First satellite to run the DOOM video game in space.

== NanoSat MO Framework (NMF) ==
The most innovative concept in OPS-SAT was the deployment of space software in the form of apps. The European Space Agency in collaboration with Graz University of Technology investigated and developed the NanoSat MO Framework – Open source software.

The NanoSat MO Framework (NMF) is a software framework for nanosatellites based on CCSDS Mission Operations services. It includes a Software Development Kit (SDK) to develop experiments as NMF Apps which can then be installed, started, and stopped in space. The framework also includes monitoring and control capabilities for the apps which will allow experimenters from the ground to take control of their software when it is running in space.

The OPS-SAT system image comes with the NanoSat MO Framework which interfaces with all of the OPS-SAT payload systems and provides it in the form of services to the experimenter application. The NanoSat MO Framework allows simple integration of other libraries and applications. During the development of the experiments, the NMF SDK can be used and it includes a simulator, providing most of the platform functionalities accessible to the experimenter. The simulator allows developers to make their NMF Apps without the need to access an advanced satellite testbed hardware platform.

== Follow-up missions ==
The original OPS-SAT is known as OPS-SAT-1 in retrospect. PRETTY was originally a separate program for a cube satellite that launched in 2023, but was taken under the leadership of the OPS-SAT Space Lab in 2025 and was renamed to OPS-SAT PRETTY. It is still in orbit as of 2026. OPS-SAT VOLT and OPS-SAT ORIOLE are two additional follow-ups; both are scheduled to launch in 2027.

== See also ==
- List of CubeSats
- NanoSat MO Framework
