= XML Telemetric and Command Exchange =

XML based data exchange format for spacecraft telemetry and command meta-data

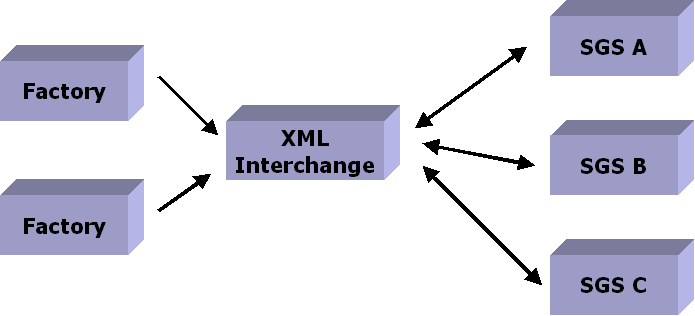

XTCE (for XML Telemetric and Command Exchange) is an XML based data exchange format for spacecraft telemetry and command meta-data. Using XTCE the format and content of a space systems command and telemetry links can be readily exchanged between spacecraft operators and manufacturers. XTCE was originally standardized by the OMG. In April 2007 the OMG released revision 1.1 of XTCE as an OMG available specification. Version 1.0 of the XTCE specification is a CCSDS green-book specification and version 1.1 has been adopted as a CCSDS blue-book specification.

== Overview ==
During the entire ground system development and operation phases of a mission, telemetry and telecommand definitions may be exchanged between multiple systems and organizations. Without a standard format, databases need dedicated converters to convert between the various proprietary database formats and editors. Allowing for a common database exchange format throughout the entire mission lifecycle will significantly reduce the cost of database conversions that occur in many space projects. XTCE has been developed as part of an international cooperation involving the National Aeronautics and Space Administration, the Jet Propulsion Laboratory, the Goddard Space Flight Center, the European Space Agency, the United States Air Force and private industry including RT Logic, Harris, SciSys, Boeing and Lockheed Martin. The standards development effort has been coordinated via the Consultative Committee for Space Data Systems and the Object Management Group. The XML Telemetry and Command Exchange standard is now in active use as a means to exchange mission databases improving interoperability while reducing mission readiness costs.
