= Posidònia (satellite) =

The first satellite of the Balearic Islands

- Operator: (Spain) Balearic Islands
- COSPAR ID: 2026-156BF
- Website: www.open-cosmos.com/launches/posidonia

Spacecraft properties
- Manufacturer: Open Cosmos

Start of mission
- Launch date: 7 July 2026, 7:12 UTC
- Rocket: Falcon 9 Transporter-17

Posidònia is a Spanish Earth observation satellite developed by Open Cosmos for the Balearic Islands with funding from the European Union. Named after Posidonia, a genus of seagrass that grows around the islands, it is the first satellite operated by the province. Its goal is to provide near-real-time observations of the Mediterranean region for use in response to emergencies, climate change monitoring, and land and tourism management. The satellite was launched in July 2026 on Falcon 9's mission Transporter-17 alongside the Greek Hyperion GR-1 as part of the OpenConstellation 1.0 satellite constellation by Open Cosmos.
