= Posidonia (band) =

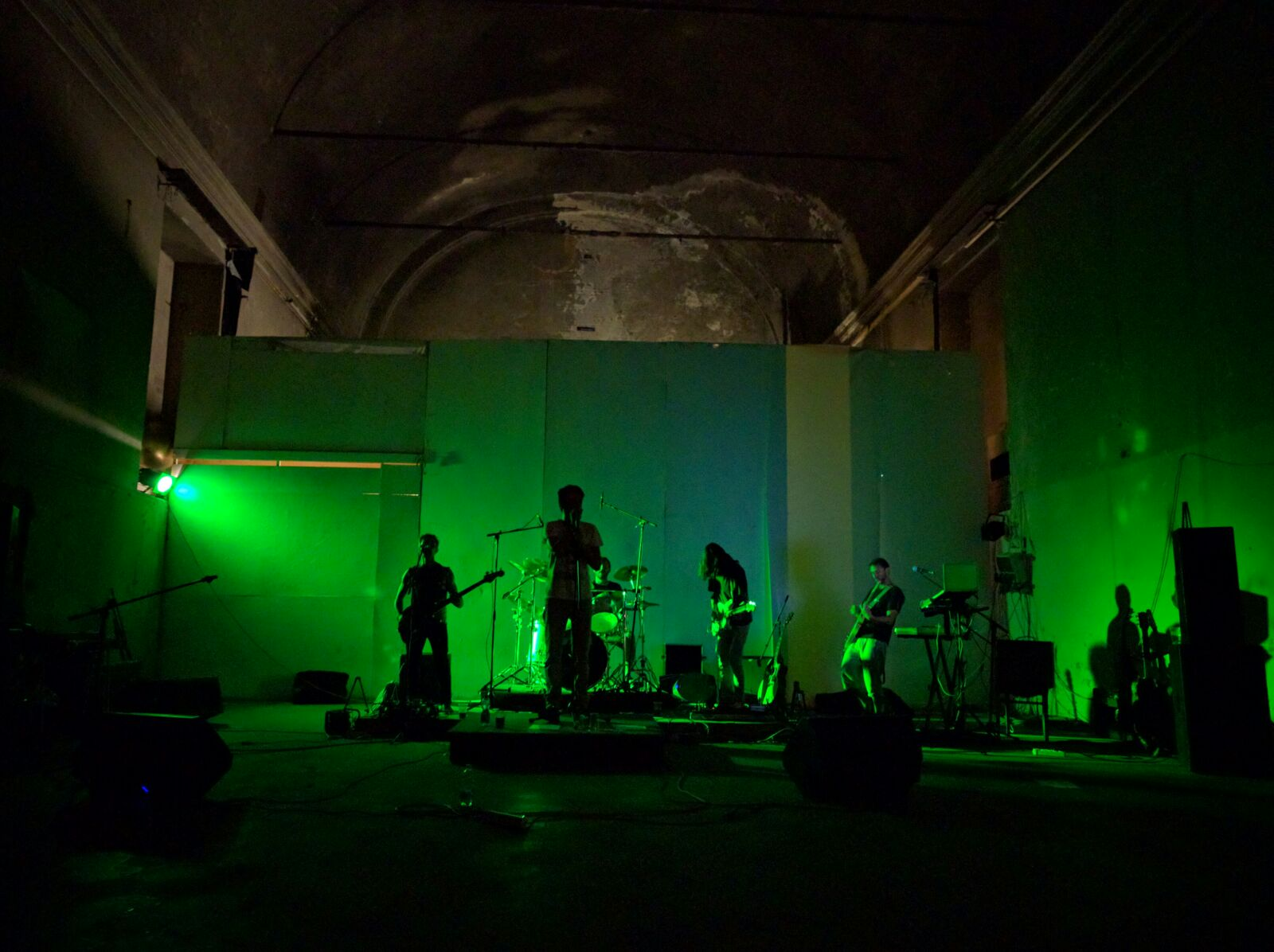

Background information
- Origin: Turin, Italy
- Genres: Progressive pop, alternative rock, indie rock
- Years active: 2012–present
- Label: Independent
- Members: Fabrizio Romanelli; Alfio Minissale; Elia Pivotto; Camel Tosis
- Past members: Luigi Carofilo; Jean Louis Camilli
- Website: posidoniaband.bandcamp.com

Posidonia are an Italian progressive pop band from Turin, formed in 2012 in Turin.

== Biography ==
The band was formed at the end of 2012 by Alfio Minissale [Bass] and Fabrizio Romanelli [Keyboards, Guitars], starting from several previous projects under the name of Posidonia Gardens.

"I was thinking we were working on a project, where everything was planned and pre-built ad hoc. I thought that we were following some logical path, inspired by mathematics, while building our sounds and structures. Indeed, the poietic process was inspired rather than being built from scratch. The ideas in Kurtosis were raining down from satellites and floated in mid-air; thanks to the pragmatic contribution of all the band members, they could finally reach the soil, at first and then the depth of the ocean. Kurtosis is walking away from pre-defined and defined schemas. Kurtosis shout out loud a clear message to the music scene: evolution is away from certainties."

— Fabrizio interview after 2016 first concert promoting 'Kurtosis'

2014 is the year when the band comes to a more defined style, starting from several songs, arrangements pretty heterogeneous amongst them. Elia Pivotto (vocals) became a member, giving birth to the present formation which takes the name of Posidonia in 2015.

2016 is the year of change. The band was a part of several festivals and competitions in the north of Italy during September and October 2016, and it started a collaboration with Alka Record, an Italian music label, which brought the band to produce their first EP under a label, that was released early in 2017. Due to some divergences of thought and about the vision of the project, Jean Louis Camilli chose to leave the band after the autumn 2016 tour. The band then added a new drummer Camel Tosis [Drums] to their formation in order to reach the goal of being produced by a nationwide label.

At the beginning of November 2016, Posidonia was informed that they passed the second phase of the Tour Music Fest (an Italian nationwide music competition) and they were to attend the semi-finals in Rome on 19 November.

== Style ==
Posidonia genre is not easily identifiable and classifiable since multiple flavors and different sounds flow in its style: from 70s rock to prog-rock, from post-rock to indie music and 80s and 90s alternative music, from pop to more sophisticated and modern electronic sounds. However, the main style stream is progressive pop, where Posidonia can be fully identified. Pursuit, research and sperimentation in music universe is the key for Posidonia, together with linguistic and artistic sperimentation as the creativity engine of the band.

== Name ==
Posidonia refers to Posidonia, a genus of flowering plants, widespread in the Mediterranean sea.

"For some reason I thought that the world needed for new, fresh air. I was just able to look straight in the eyes of reality only staring with the need of a real change, but not only to see it, but being part of it. The idea of breathing fresh air, look at the world from above, but this time from below. Breathe fresh air: water! Posidonia creates underwater prairies, crucial for environment equilibrium. Posidonia represents balance and so our music must communicate restlessness and calm, anxiety and serenity, agitation and tranquillity."

— Alfio interview after 2015 acoustic live sessions

The first Posidonia full-length album, gets ideas from the Greek word κυρτός which in statistics represents the tailedness of the probability distribution.

== Members ==
Current members

- Elia Pivotto - lead vocals, Background keyboards(2014–present)
- Fabrizio Romanelli - keyboards, Guitars, background vocals (2012–present)
- Alfio Minissale - bass guitar, background vocals (2012–present)
- Camel Tosis - drums (2016–present)

Former members

- Luigi Carofilo - lead guitar (2013-2016)
- Jean Louis Camilli - drums (2013–2016)

== Discography ==
Studio albums

- Kurtosis (2016)

Singles

- History is a bitch (2016)
- Scratch (2016)
- Ethan (2016)
- Senses (2016)
