= Space Park Leicester =

Space hub building in Leicester, England

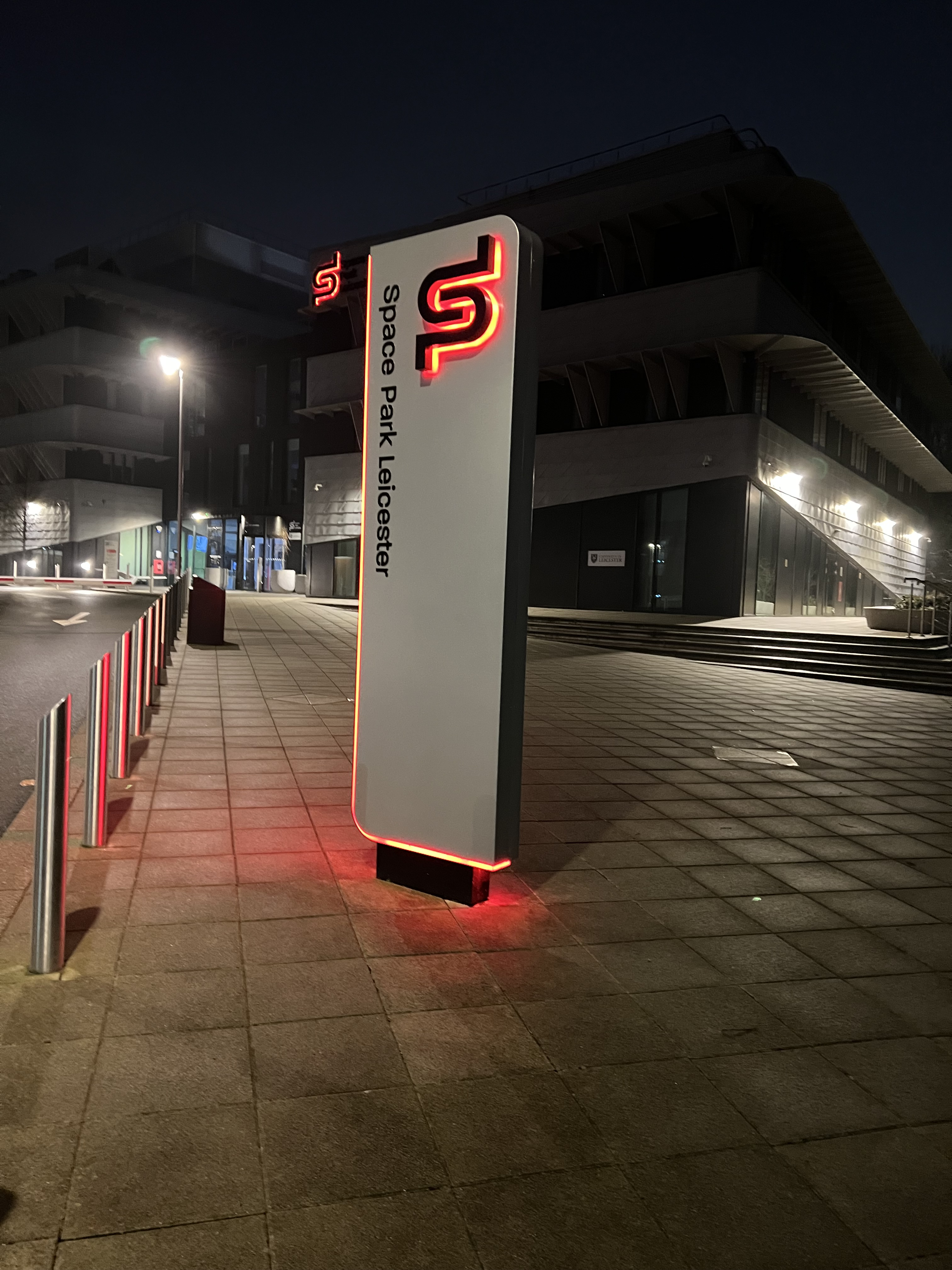

General information
- Location: Corporation Road, Belgrave, Leicester, England
- Current tenants: Rolls Royce, Airbus, Northrop Grumman, Satellite Applications Catapult, Maxar, Atomic Weapons Establishment, UK Space Agency, National Centre for Earth Observation, University of Leicester, Open Cosmos, CGI, Exosens and EarthSense.

Design and construction
- Architecture firm: Shepheard Epstein Hunter

Space Park Leicester is a research, innovation and teaching hub in England for space-related high-tech companies and researchers focussing primarily on research, development and applications of space. It is located in Belgrave, Leicester next to the National Space Centre and the River Soar. It was officially opened by British astronaut Tim Peake on 14 March 2022. Organisations that reside at Space Park Leicester include Rolls Royce, Airbus, Northrop Grumman, Satellite Applications Catapult, Maxar, Atomic Weapons Establishment, UK Space Agency, National Centre for Earth Observation, University of Leicester, Open Cosmos, CGI, Exosens and EarthSense.

== Facilities ==
In 2024 the first space instrument was developed at the park. The Soft X-ray Imager (SXI) was completed and delivered for integration into the European Space Agency’s Solar wind Magnetosphere Ionosphere Link Explorer (SMILE) mission. The SXI is a wide-field X-ray telescope designed to map Earth's magnetospheric boundaries using micropore optics. It was developed through a collaboration between the University of Leicester, Mullard Space Science Laboratory, the Open University and several European institutions. The instrument was assembled and tested in Space Park Leicester's cleanroom facilities before being delivered to Airbus Defence and Space in Madrid for integration into the SMILE.
