= National Centre for Earth Observation =

English governmental organisation

- Abbreviation: NCEO
- Legal status: Government Organisation
- Headquarters: Space Park Leicester, Belgrave, Leicester
- Region served: United Kingdom
- Director: Professor John Remedios
- Parent organization: Natural Environment Research Council
- Website: nceo.ac.uk

The National Centre for Earth Observation (NCEO) is part of the Natural Environment Research Council (NERC) and looks at improving knowledge of the planet by taking Earth observations from space and aircraft, as well as from the ground, to produce models which will help understand, respond and adapt to climate and environmental changes.

== History ==
The organisation was previously centred at the University of Reading, known nationally for its department of meteorology, which requires satellite observation of the Earth. The NCEO is now at the University of Leicester, known for its research into astronomy and its National Space Centre, and is led by Professor John Remedios.

== Structure ==
The NCEO is based in the United Kingdom and works closely with the UK satellite industry. It is a part of the larger Natural Environment Research Council (NERC).

== See also ==
- British Geological Survey in Rushcliffe, Nottinghamshire
- Centre for Environmental Data Analysis (CEDA) at the Rutherford-Appleton Laboratory at Harwell.
- National Centre for Atmospheric Science at the University of Leeds
- Category:Earth observation satellites of the European Space Agency
