= Hyperion GR =

Greek satellite constellation for optical observation of Earth

- Manufacturer: Open Cosmos
- Country of origin: Greece
- Operator: Government Geospatial Observation Hub

Production
- Planned: 7
- Launched: 1
- Maiden launch: 7 July 2026

Related spacecraft
- Launch vehicle: Falcon 9

Hyperion GR is a Greek satellite constellation of optical Earth observation satellites under development by Open Cosmos for the Ministry of Digital Governance under the National Microsatellite Program, with the support of the Hellenic Space Center (HSC) and the European Space Agency (ESA). Its goal is to provide panchromatic imagery of Earth surface at 90 cm resolution for use in civil and infrastructure protection, environmental monitoring, maritime surveillance, and agriculture. When completed, the constellation will comprise seven microsatellites in low Earth orbit. First of the satellites, Hyperion GR-1, was launched on Falcon 9's mission Transporter-17 in July 2026.
