= Poseidonia =

Village in Syros, Greece

Poseidonia Ποσειδωνία
- Municipal unit
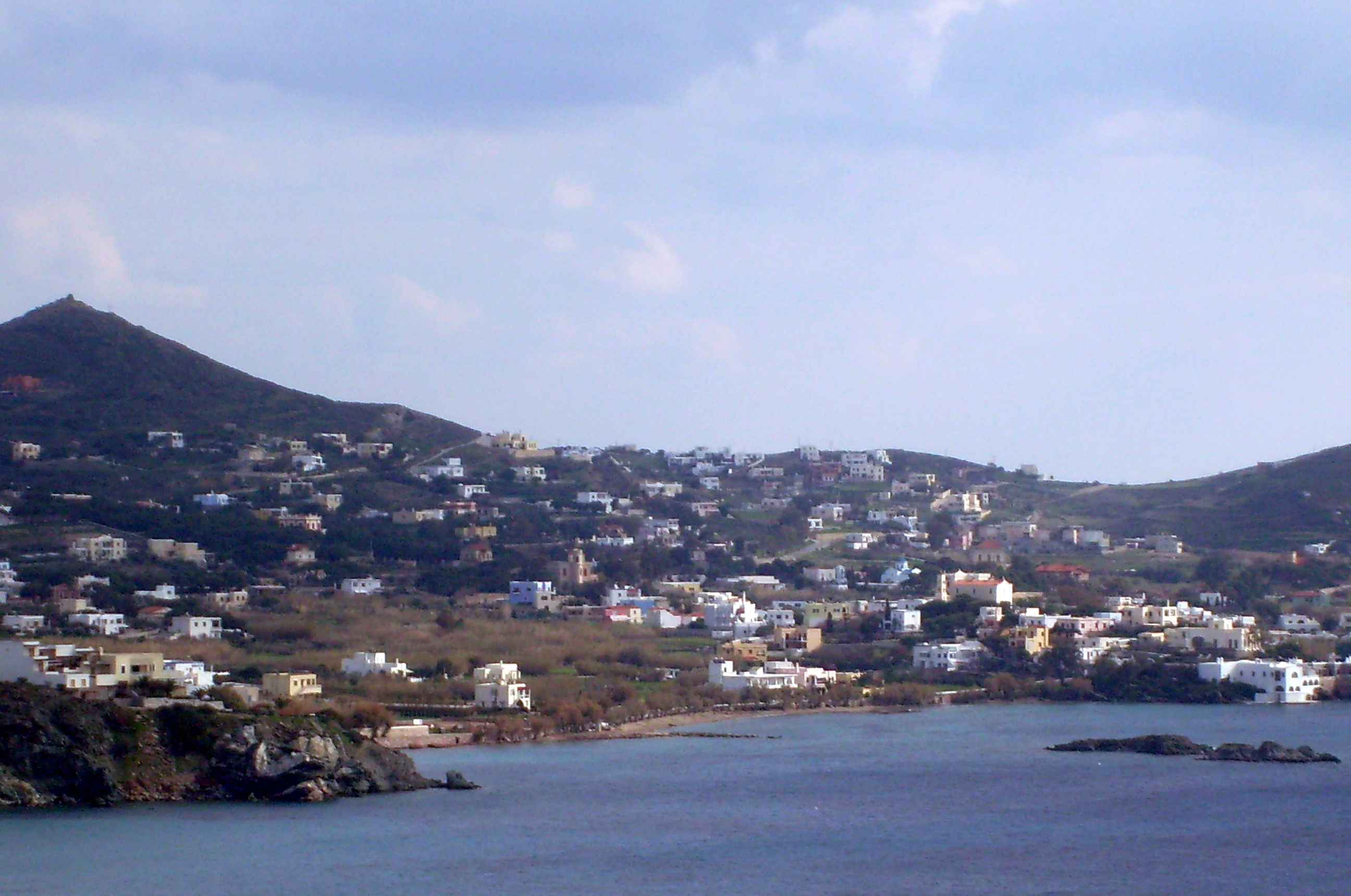
- View of Poseidonia

- Location within the regional unit

- Location within Greece
- Coordinates: 37°23′N 24°53′E
- Country: Greece
- Administrative region: South Aegean
- Regional unit: Syros
- Municipality: Syros-Ermoupoli

Area
  - Municipal unit: 23.7 km^{2} (9.2 sq mi)

Population (2021)
  - Municipal unit: 4,114
  - Municipal unit density: 174/km^{2} (450/sq mi)
  - Community: 967
- Time zone: UTC+2 (EET)
  - Summer (DST): UTC+3 (EEST)
- Vehicle registration: EM

Poseidonia (Greek: Ποσειδωνία, romanized: Posidonía, named after Poseidon) is a village and a former municipality on the island of Syros, in the Cyclades, Greece. Since the 2011 local government reform it is part of the municipality Syros-Ermoupoli, of which it is a municipal unit. The population was 4,114 inhabitants at the 2021 census, and the land area is 23.705 km². The municipal unit shares the island of Syros with the municipal units of Ano Syros and Ermoupoli. It is also known as Dellagrazia (name taken from a small church of Maria della Grazia).
