= Consultative Committee for Space Data Systems =

Coordinator of data standards for space communication

The Consultative Committee for Space Data Systems (CCSDS) was founded in 1982 for governmental and quasi-governmental space agencies to discuss and develop standards for space data and information systems. Currently composed of "eleven member agencies, twenty-eight observer agencies, and over 140 industrial associates," the CCSDS works to support collaboration and interoperability between member agencies through the establishment of data and system standards. According to the organisation's website, more than 1000 space missions have utilized data and systems standards created by CCSDS. The activities of the CCSDS are organized around six topic areas and composed of many working groups within the overall Collaborative Working Group Environment (CWE).

== Publications and standards ==
The CCSDS is divided into 6 Technical areas:

- Space Internetworking Services
- Mission Operations And Information Management Services
- Spacecraft Onboard Interface Services
- System Engineering
- Cross Support Services
- Space Link Services

The CCSDS has developed data standards and information system frameworks covering a variety of areas including data creation, transmission, management, and preservation as well as the systems supporting that data. These include protocols and network notes for communication in space including contributions to Interplanetary Internet and Space Communications Protocol Specifications. Other standards include XML Telemetric and Command Exchange and frameworks such as the Mission Operations Services Concept and the Open Archival Information System, the latter a model also adopted by the broader Digital preservation and Data curation community.

Some of the Standards developed by the CCSDS are:

- CCSDS Mission Operations services
- CCSDS File Delivery Protocol (CFDP)
- Electronic Data Sheets (EDS)
- Space Link Extension (SLE)
- XML Telemetric and Command Exchange (XTCE)

== Membership ==
Each nation participating in the CCSDS can have one organization serve as a member agency. The current 11 member agencies in the CCSDS are:

- Agenzia Spaziale Italiana (ASI) or, Italian Space Agency, Italy
- Canadian Space Agency (CSA), Canada
- Centre National d'Etudes Spatiales (CNES) or, National Centre for Space Studies, France
- China National Space Administration (CNSA), China
- Deutsches Zentrum für Luft- und Raumfahrt (DLR), Germany
- European Space Agency (ESA)
- National Institute for Space Research (INPE), Brazil
- Japan Aerospace Exploration Agency (JAXA), Japan
- National Aeronautics and Space Administration (NASA), United States
- ROSCOSMOS, Russia
- UK Space Agency, United Kingdom

== See also ==
- List of government space agencies
