= National Space Centre (England) =

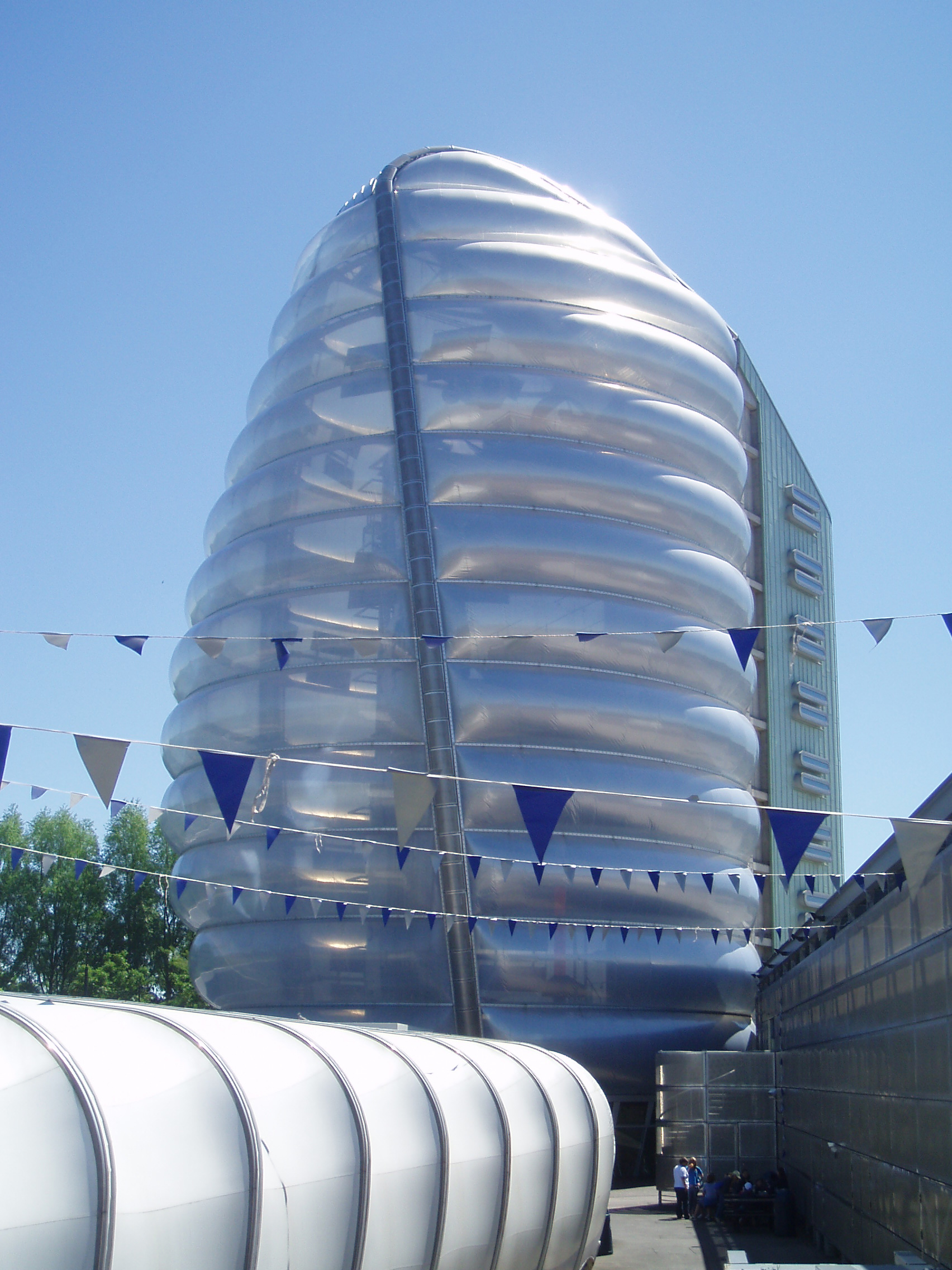
- National Space Centre, Leicester

- Location of National Space Centre in Leicester
- Former name: National Space Science Centre
- Established: 30 June 2001; 25 years ago
- Location: Belgrave, Leicester LE4 5NS
- Coordinates: 52°39′13″N 01°07′56″W
- Type: Space (and aerospace) museum
- Visitors: 330,000 (2016)
- Curator: Dan Kendall
- Architect: Nicholas Grimshaw
- Employees: 189
- Public transit access: First Bus 54
- Website: spacecentre.co.uk

The National Space Centre is a museum and educational resource covering the fields of space science and astronomy, along with a space research programme in partnership with the University of Leicester. It is located on the north side of the city in Belgrave, Leicester, England, next to Space Park Leicester and the River Soar. Many of the exhibits, including upright rockets are housed in a tower with minimal steel supports and a semi-transparent cladding of ETFE 'pillows', which has become one of Leicester's most recognisable landmarks. The National Space Centre contains the United Kingdom's largest planetarium. It is a registered charity with a board of trustees.

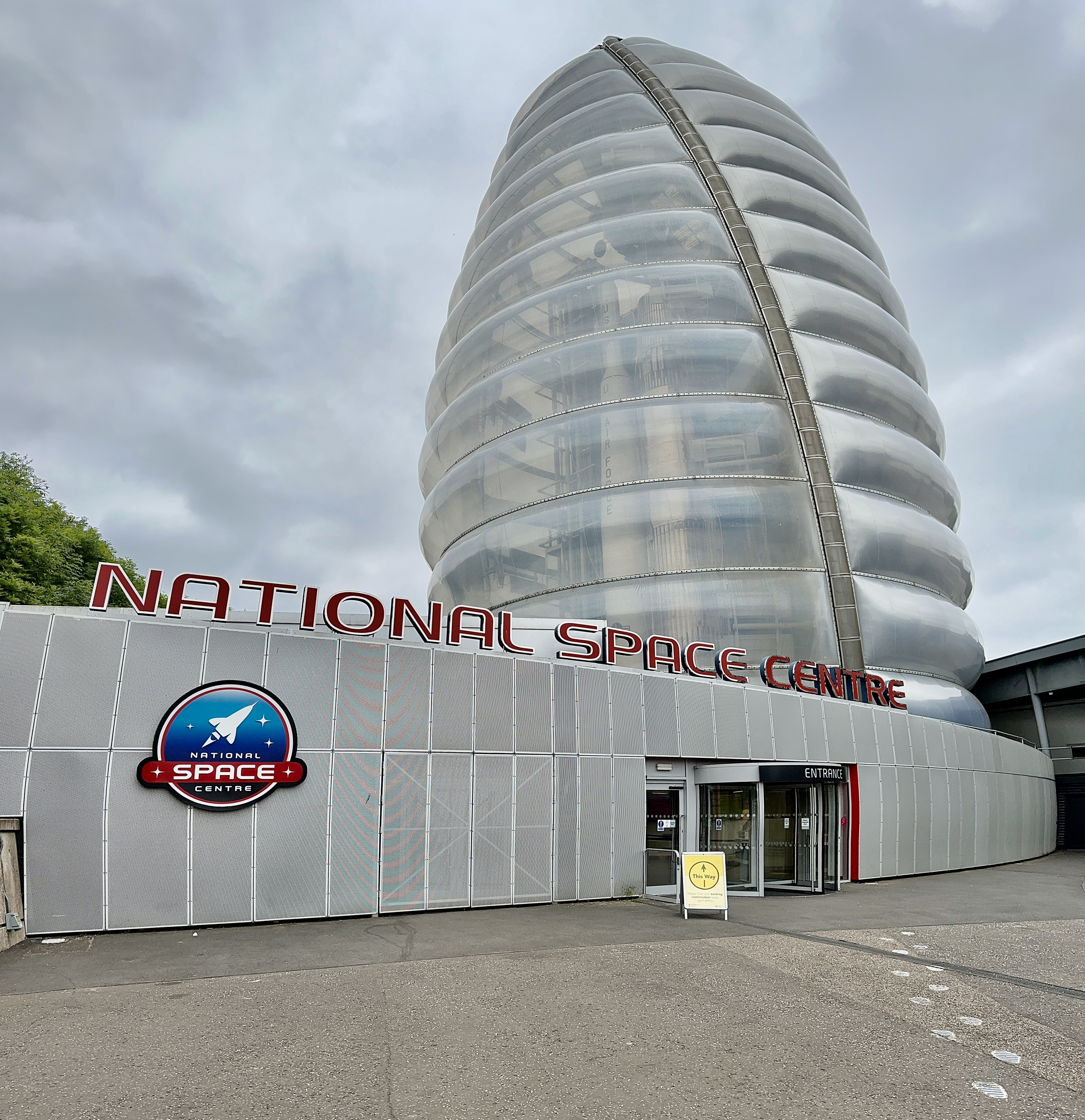

== History ==
The initial idea of a space centre as a research facility but with public access, attached to the University of Leicester was first conceived in the 1980s – the idea of Professor Alan Wells, the Director of the University of Leicester's Space Research Centre and Professor Ken Pounds of the university. The plan was not taken further due to lack of funds.

The Space Centre as a museum was then put forward in 1995 by Professor Alan Wells; Professor Alan Ponter, the University of Leicester's pro vice-chancellor; and Nigel Siesage, the university's principal assistant registrar.

Funding for the project came from the Millennium Commission, who provided 50% of the £52 million capital cost, four major partners; Leicester City Council, the University of Leicester, East Midlands Development Agency and BT; along with contributions from exhibition sponsors, Walkers, the Met Office, Omega, BNSC and Astrium.

The first element of the project was the Challenger Learning Centre which opened at Leicester University in December 1999 and moved to the National Space Centre site a year later. It was the first such centre outside North America, where 42 similar centres existed. The centre was split in two, with one half replicating the inside of a spacecraft and the other, mission control.

Originally it was to be called the National Space Science Centre, but in December 2000 the word science was dropped from the name for marketing reasons as the National Space Centre was often confused with the British National Space Centre, until they changed their name to the UK Space Agency.

== Opening ==
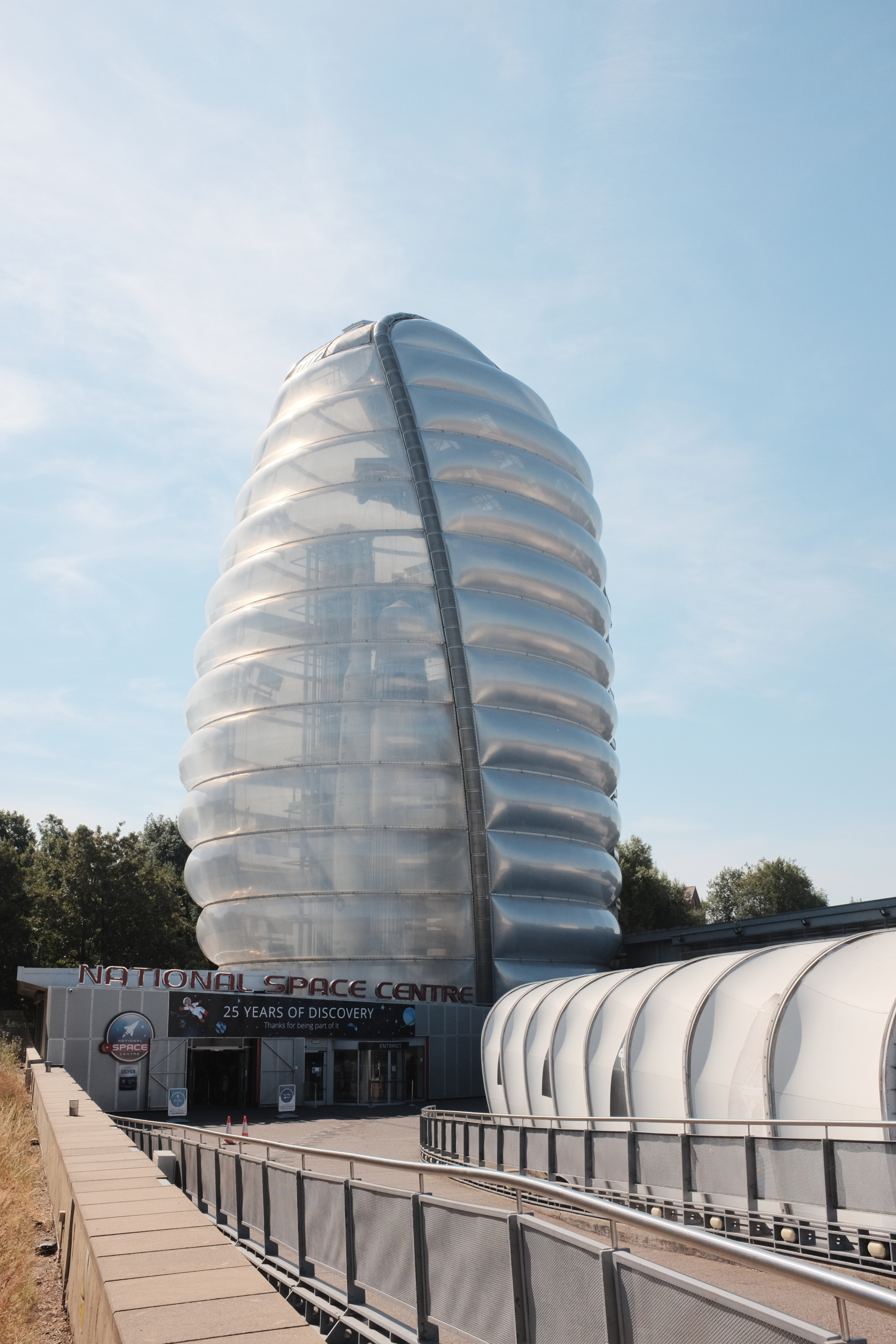
National Space Centre, Leicester, UK, as viewed from the main entrance in 2026

On 30 June 2001, former NASA astronaut Jeffrey A. Hoffman opened the National Space Centre officially to the general public. In its first five months, the National Space Centre received 165,000 visitors, 25% ahead of its targets and was named Museum of the Year by the Good Britain Guide 2002.

At opening, the centre was the base for more than 60 scientists and astronomers working on projects in a Space Science Research Unit (SSRU).

== Astronaut visits ==
=== Jeffrey A. Hoffman ===
On 30 June 2001, former NASA Astronaut Jeffrey A. Hoffman opened the National Space Centre officially to the general public.

=== Helen Sharman ===
Former Astronaut Helen Sharman showed Her Majesty Queen Elizabeth II and the Duke of Edinburgh around when they visited the National Space Centre on 1 August 2002, as part of the Golden Jubilee National Tour.

=== Michael Foale ===
On 19 October 2004, NASA Astronaut Michael Foale visited the National Space Centre to launch the brand-new Rocket Tower glass lifts.

=== Bernard Harris ===
Bernard Harris, the first African American to walk in space, visited the National Space Centre as part of the centre's Festival of Science and Culture over the weekend of the 12 and 13 March 2005.

=== Buzz Aldrin ===
In June 2005 Apollo 11 Astronaut, moonwalker and second man on the Moon Buzz Aldrin visited the National Space Centre. He spoke to children and toured the Lunar Base 2025 Experience.

=== Brian Duffy ===
On 19 July 2006 NASA Astronaut Brian Duffy visited and told people about his trip to space.

=== Piers Sellers ===
National Space Centre hosted a UK tour by the NASA STS-121 crew, including UK-born Astronaut Piers Sellers. The crew spoke to MPs, industry leaders and school children about the UK Space Industry.

=== Chris Hadfield ===
On 13 December 2013 Commander Chris Hadfield visited the National Space Centre to meet the visitors and to promote his book An Astronaut's Guide to Life on Earth.

=== Walter Cunningham ===
Apollo 7 Astronaut Walt Cunningham visited the National Space Centre on 24 September 2015.

=== Tim Peake ===
Following his six-month mission on the International Space Station, Tim Peake visited the National Space Centre on Friday 14 October 2016 where he talked to local school children and visitors and received an Honorary Degree of Doctor of Science from the University of Leicester. Although this was his first physical visit, during his mission he linked live from space to the National Space Centre on two occasions, answering questions from school children and the media.

== Architecture ==
Nicholas Grimshaw, the architects of the Eden Project, won an architectural competition to design the National Space Centre in September 1996 beating four other architects. The fit out of the building was undertaken by C-Beck Group. The structural and services engineer was Arup, the quantity surveyor was Capita Property Services, the project manager was Gardiner and Theobold, management services and main contractor was Sir Robert McAlpine, the landscape architect was Land Use Consultants, the cladding consultant was Montressor Partnership, and the acoustic consultant was Sandy Brown Associates. The tower is 42 m (138 ft) tall and claims to be the only place to house upright space rockets indoors, although from Nov 2026 the California Science Center will open an indoor exhibit containing the Space Shuttle Endeavour upright in launch configuration with external fuel tank and solid rocket boosters.

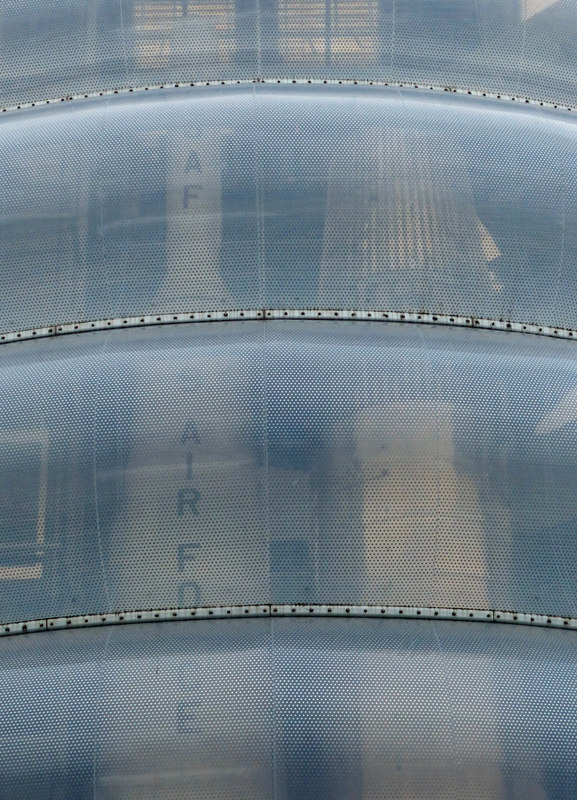
The rockets in the rocket tower.

=== Building ===
The 7,360m^{2} scheme occupies a former storm water tank, which now forms the foundations of the building, reducing costs and maximising the reuse of the existing structure. The main rocket tower is clad in inflated pillows made of ETFE – the same material used on the Eden Project domes. This material is 1% of the weight of the equivalent amount of glass. The building was described by The Guardian as "One of the most distinctive and intriguing new buildings in Britain". The main building is a 7200m^{2} box built on a 14m grid steel frame, clad in a perforated metal skin that conceals the windows and louvres in the profiled steel cladding behind. The roof of the main building is overlaid with gravel in three colours to form a crab nebulae design.

Construction began on the site in March 1999.

== Galleries ==
The National Space Centre has six main galleries, a welcome hall, an area for space talks, a planetarium and a spaceflight simulator. It also has a café and various conference and teaching rooms.

=== Welcome Hall ===
This Entrance Area contains a Soyuz Spacecraft and a Set of Spacesuits including Tim Peake’s Spacesuit, Buzz Aldrin’s Underwear and a Spacesuit from The Martian Film.

=== Into Space ===
A Gallery dedicated to space flight which includes a mock-up of the Columbus module from the International Space Station and a space toilet.

=== The Universe ===
This Gallery covers the formation of the universe, how humans observe it and the search for alien life.

=== The Solar System ===
The planets of the Solar System are the subject of this gallery which includes the TinyTarium, a planetarium especially for very young visitors.

=== Home Planet ===
A Gallery with the Planet Earth as the subject – how it is observed, how it is changing and the consequences of human actions.

=== Space Oddities ===
This is an area where selected artefacts from the National Space Centre's collection are exhibited. The Gallery is updated regularly by the Curator in order to display lesser-known objects with unique histories.

=== The Rocket Tower ===
The Rocket Tower

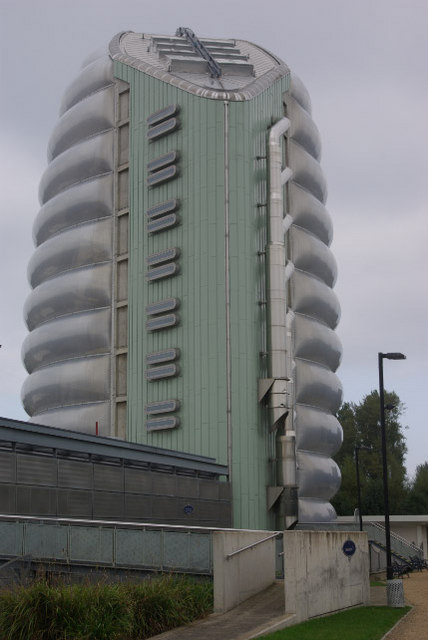
Outside of The Rocket Tower

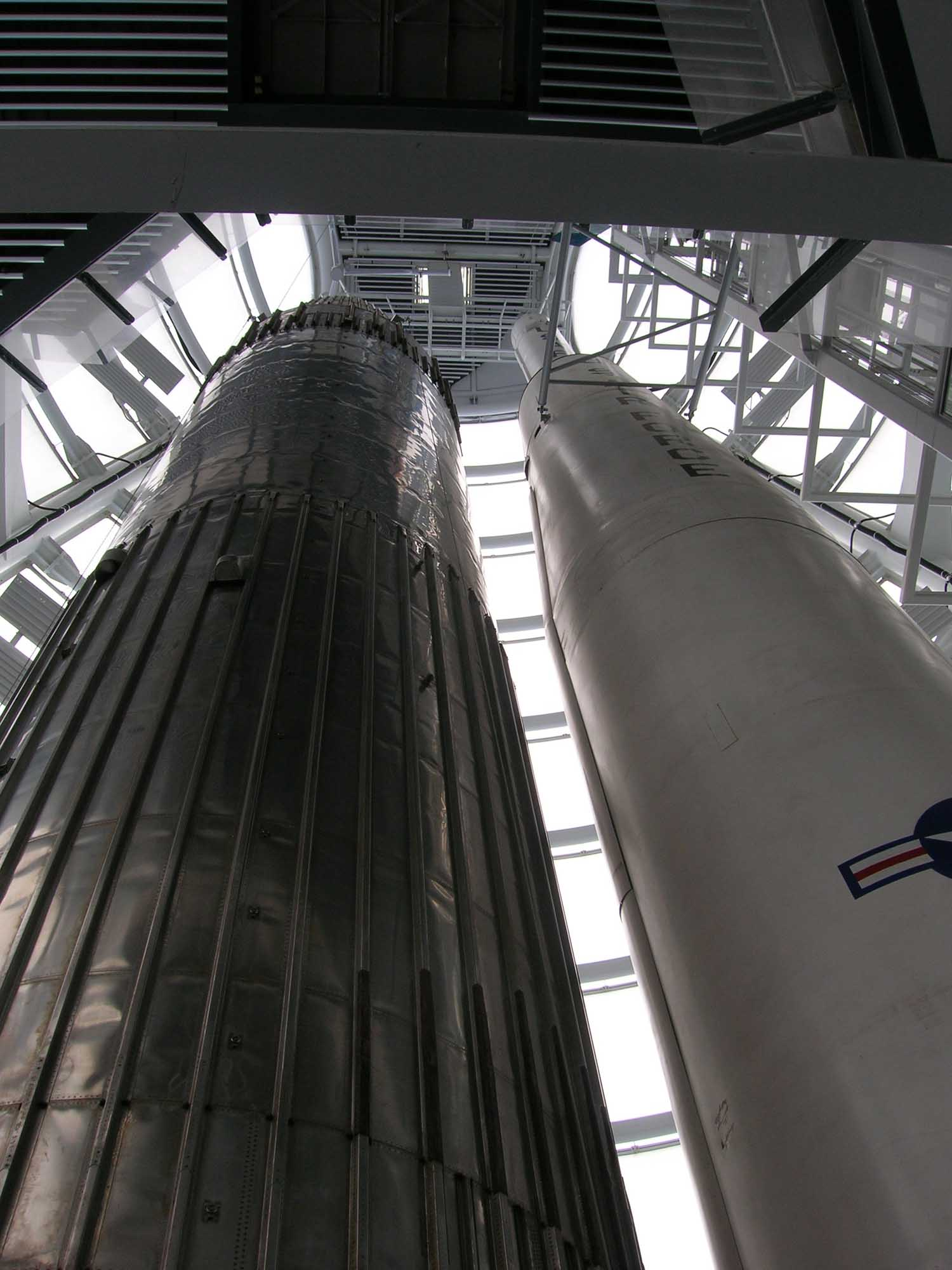
Inside, Blue Streak and Thor Able (right)

The Rocket Tower features stories from the space race and the two upright rockets it was specially designed to house, a PGM-17 Thor Able and a Blue Streak. The Rocket Tower also displays a piece of Moon Rock.

=== LIVE Space ===
LIVE Space is an area where talks, live link-ups, news from space and science demonstrations are presented.

=== Tranquillity Base ===
In July 2005 it opened the Human Spaceflight Gallery, a lunar base set in the year 2025, dubbed Tranquillity Base. Visitors received a barcode and undertook a number of interactive tasks. It also included a space ride.

=== Sir Patrick Moore Planetarium ===
On 26 January 2012 Sir Patrick Moore visited the National Space Centre to launch the Planetarium, newly renamed in his honour. He also launched a new Planetarium show, Tour of the Night Sky that included a series of 'Best Of' clips hosted by Sir Patrick himself.

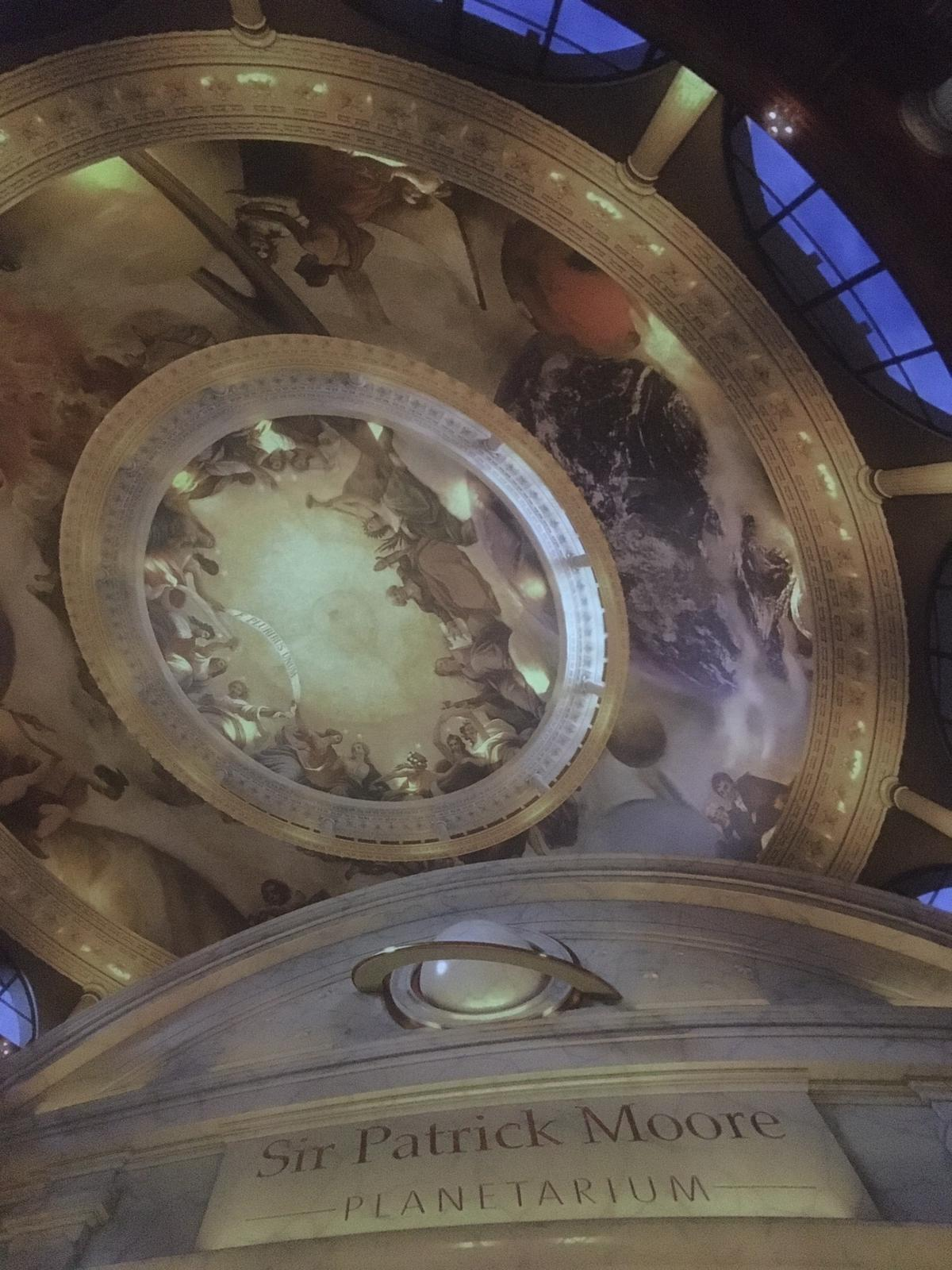
Sir Patrick Moore Planetarium

A Full Dome Planetarium which is used to project a variety of immersive shows, many of which are created by NSC Creative who are based at the National Space Centre. The Planetarium has 192 seats and 6 accessible spaces.

=== Tetrastar Spaceport ===
Launched in 2022, this is a simulated low Earth orbit cruise onboard a Spacecraft.

== Notable exhibits ==
A selection of objects held in the National Space Centre's collections can be viewed online at the National Space Centre Collections Online.

=== Moon Rock ===
A piece of real Moon Rock prised from a fractured boulder near the rim of Shorty Crater. This was collected by Gene Cernan in December 1972 during Apollo 17, the last crewed mission to the Moon. The fragment weighs 120g and is encased in a protective atmosphere.

=== Sputnik ===
A mock Sputnik, whose manufacture was overseen by creator Sergei Korolev, who demanded perfectionism; he once berated a junior technician with the words “This will be exhibited in museums”

=== Space toilet ===
A demonstration example of a Russian space toilet, constructed by NPP Zvezda. The appearance and size are the same as the type of toilet used on the Russian Mir space station. As a demonstration model it lacks the technological units needed for processing liquid and solid waste.

=== Martian spacesuit ===
An EVA Spacesuit used during the filming of Ridley Scott's 2015 film, The Martian. Worn by Matt Damon and various stunt performers, it was used with a rigging system to simulate floating in space. The costumes used in the film were designed to be accurate reflections of the sort of spacesuits that might be used in a near-future Mars mission. Costume designer Janty Yates worked with NASA and Scott to ensure that this Extra-Vehicular Activity (EVA) spacesuit worked for the film, but also imagined the future of NASA spacesuit design.

=== Beagle 2 Operations Centre ===
Mission control for the Beagle 2 mission to Mars was based at the National Space Centre and was the first NASA or ESA mission to be run in the full view of the public. Beagle 2's robotic arm, known as the PAW, was developed by a team led by the University of Leicester Space Research Group who also led on the technical design and the flight operations development.

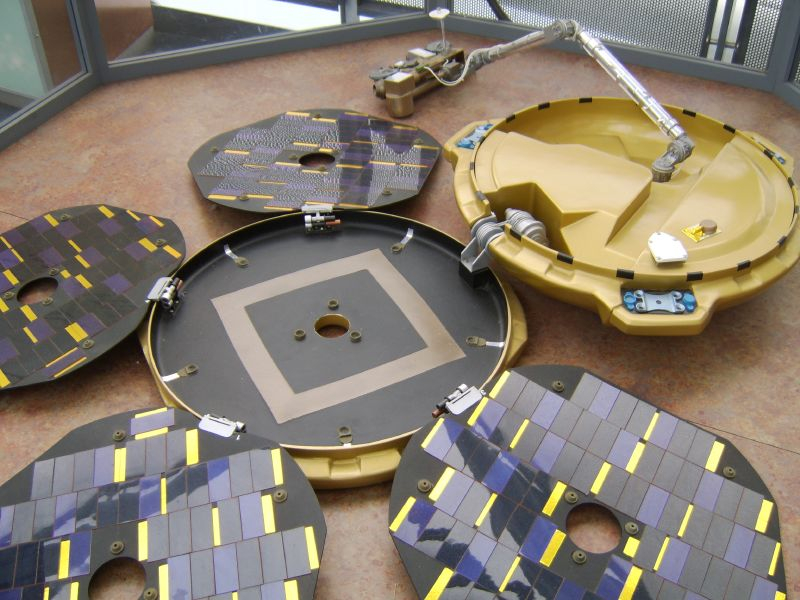
Beagle 2 at the National Space Centre

== Education ==
The National Space Centre provides education programmes that support parents and teachers to inspire children to learn about science.

=== e-missions ===
In 2004, working with the Challenger Center for Space Science Education, the National Space Centre launched e-Missions™ which included a mission to Europa where pupils have to save a crewed mission to Jupiter’s moon that is in trouble and Operation Montserrat, where pupils take the role of a military response team tasked to evacuate a population in the face of a hurricane and a potential volcanic eruption.

== National Space Academy ==
In 2008 a collaboration between the National Space Centre, University of Leicester, Nottingham University and East Midlands Development Agency resulted in the creation of the Space Academy.

The Space Academy collaborated with NASA’s Aerospace Educator Service Project and in 2010 led a session at the annual Space Exploration Educators Conference (SEEC) which draws in more than 600 teachers, space scientists and engineers from all over the United States, Canada, Europe and Japan. The Space Academy’s presentation on the ESA’s Rosetta mission was chosen to be streamed on the Internet by Space Center Houston.

Subsequently, the National Space Centre on behalf of the UK Space Agency, the Science & Technology Facilities Council (STFC), the UK Space Education Office (ESERO-UK), and the European Space Agency, launched the National Space Academy in February 2011. It was set up to promote excellence in science and technology by training teachers, offering teaching resources, hosting career events and developing apprenticeship courses.

As of 2022 a Space Engineering course provides A-levels in physics and mathematics, plus a BTEC Extended Diploma in engineering. The course is delivered by Loughborough College and the National Space Centre, including physics and mathematics delivery in the National Space Academy Science Lab in Leicester.

The National Space Academy’s resources page includes lesson starter clips on astrobiology, space-themed videos in support of STEM lessons and videos and interactive experiences for home learning.

== Facilities ==
=== Digital visualisation ===
The centre's own digital visualisation team, NSC Creative, make all the "fulldome" planetarium shows shown at the centre. By 2011, NSC Creative fulldome shows are playing in over 220 planetaria in 27 countries worldwide. These productions include the official International Year of Astronomy (IYA2009) planetarium show "We are Astronomers" which was funded by the UK Science and Technology Facilities Council (STFC).

=== Near Earth Objects Information Centre ===
The NEO Information Centre's launch was announced in January 2002 by the science minister, Lord Sainsbury. Based at the National Space Centre in Leicester, it was set up as part of the UK Government's response to the report of the task force on Potentially Hazardous Near Earth Objects. It provided information to the public, media, educators and scientists on Near Earth Objects, the science behind them and the potential hazard they pose to life on Earth.

Government funding for the NEO Information Centre was not renewed in 2010 and the Leicester-based Centre was closed. Monitoring of near-Earth objects is currently undertaken by the Spaceguard Centre.

== Events ==
=== Queen's Visit ===
Her Majesty Queen Elizabeth and the Duke of Edinburgh visited the National Space Centre on 1 August 2002, as part of her Golden Jubilee National Tour. The Queen gave a Speech.

=== Olympic Torch ===
On 3 July 2012 the Olympic Torch Relay visited Leicester. At the National Space Centre the torch was carried over The Rocket Tower by stuntman Nick Macomber AKA “Jet Pack Man” before being handed off to Kevin Davies who left the National Space Centre with an honour guard of Stormtroopers.

=== Other Events ===
- The first Star Wars Day was held on 30 July 2005. Due to the popularity of this event Star Wars Weekend has been held annually as of 2015.
- The centre hosted a celebration of 50 years of Doctor Who in November 2013.
- In 2007 the National Space Centre celebrated "50 Years in Space": the anniversary of the first satellite Sputnik.

== In popular culture ==
=== Back in Business ===
Back in Business, a comedy starring Martin Kemp, Dennis Waterman and Chris Barrie about a heist involving a Moon buggy was partly filmed at the National Space Centre in 2005, with the film released in 2007.

=== Don't Tell the Bride ===
On 2 October 2012 the National Space Centre became the venue for the BBC TV show Don't Tell the Bride, which was aired as Episode 8 of Season 6.

=== Public Service Broadcasting ===
On 26 February 2015 the Galleries of the National Space Centre were taken over by Public Service Broadcasting, as the musical duo launched their new album The Race for Space.

=== Yamla Pagla Deewana 2 ===
In 2013 scenes from the Indian film Yamla Pagla Deewana 2 were filmed at the National Space Centre.

== Gallery ==
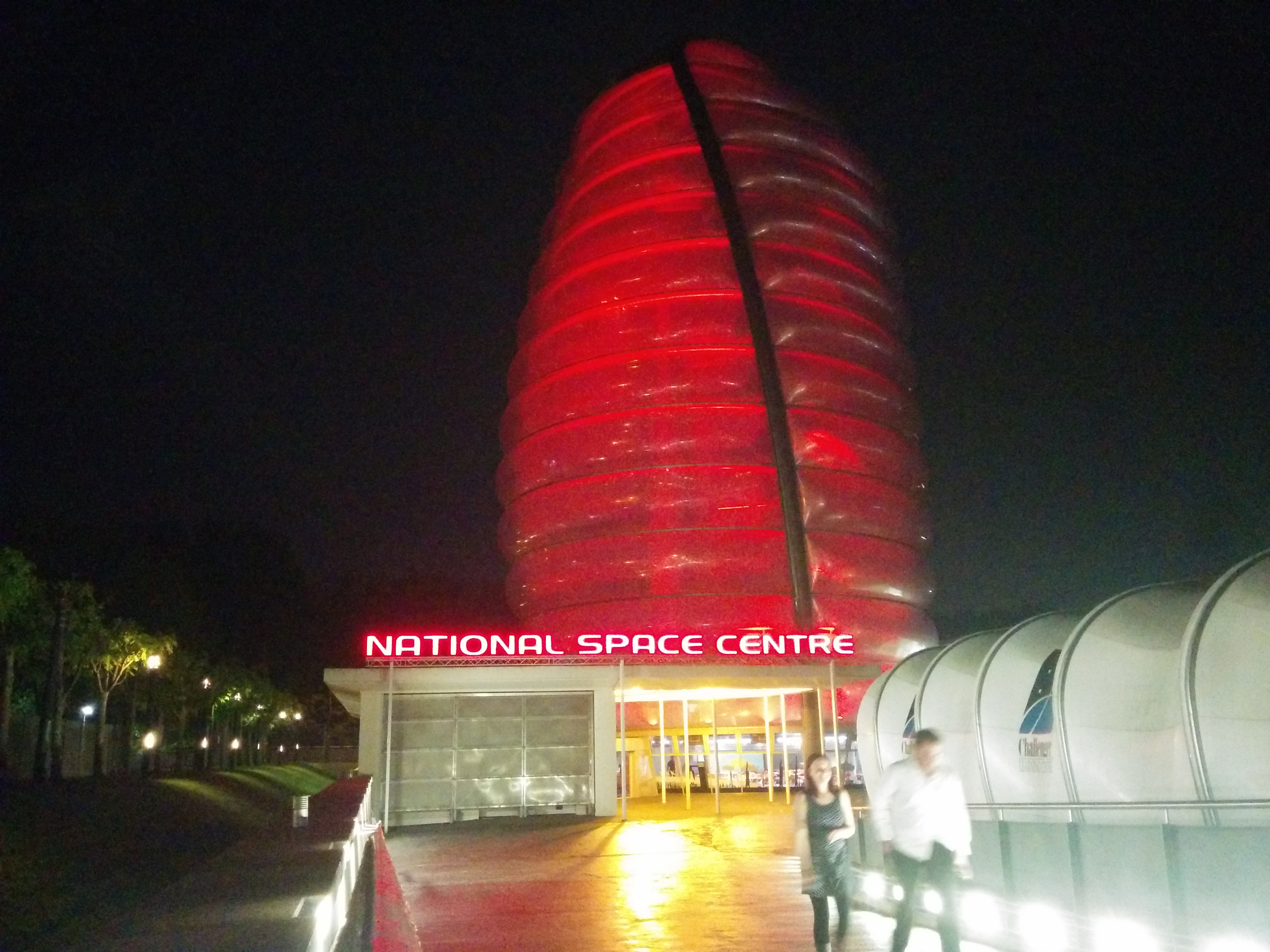
Lit up

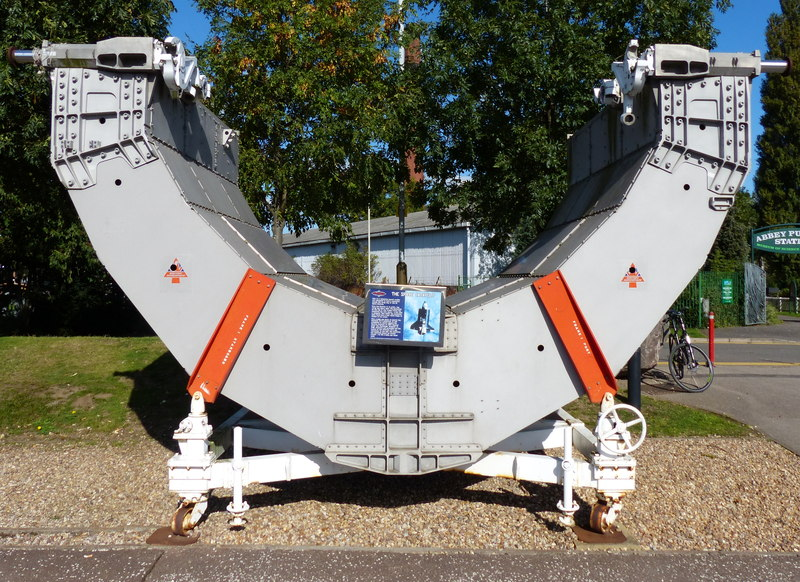
The space catapult

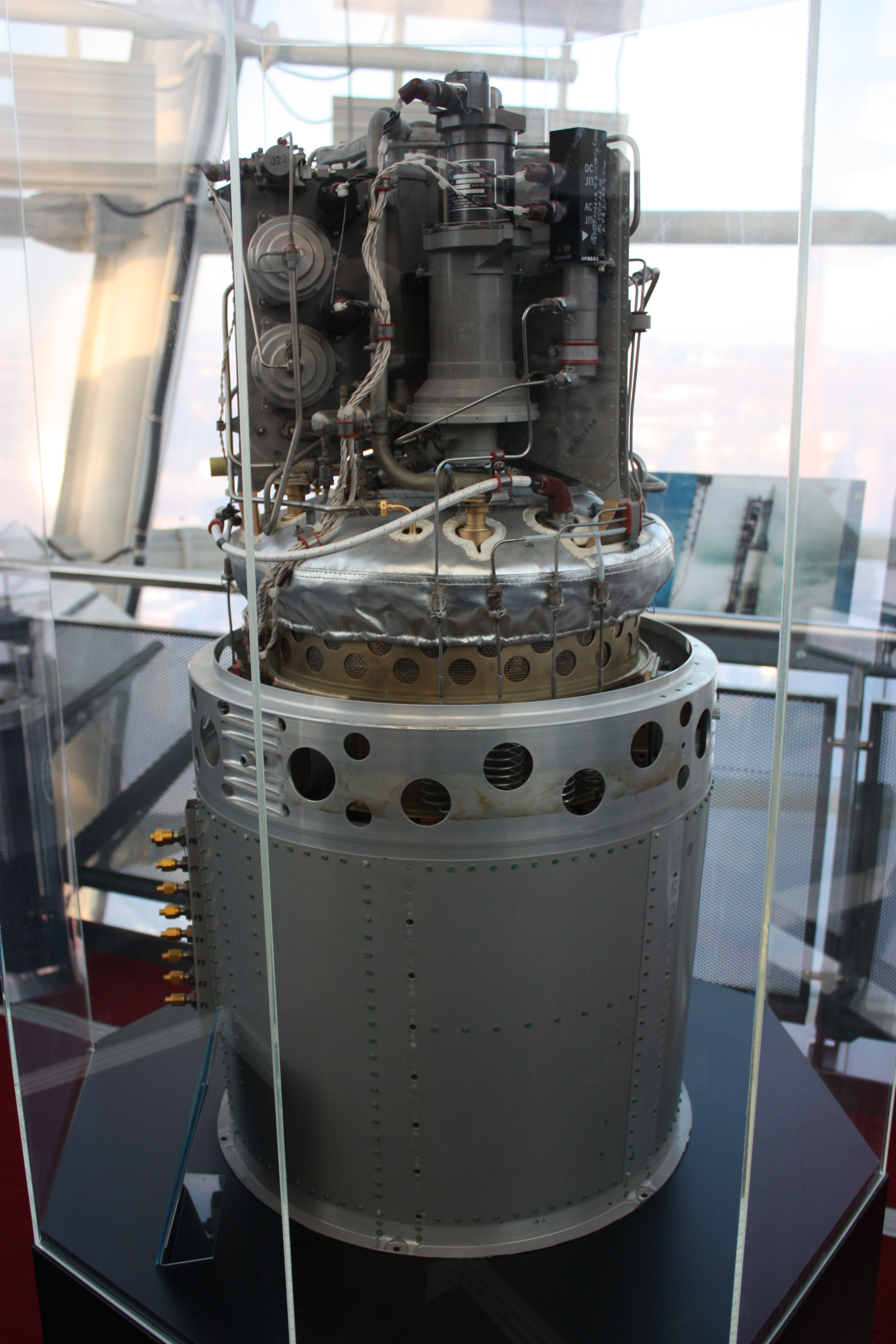
Apollo spacecraft service module fuel cell

== Governance ==
The charity was registered on 10 January 2000 and (as of 2020) has 17 Trustees.

The National Space Centre receives no day-to-day funding from the government and generates revenue primarily from commercial activity such as ticket sales, café and gift shop revenue, venue hire and sponsorship.

Accounts for 2020 show that income was £5.4 million and expenditure was £5.9 million, of which £5 million was spent on charitable activities and the rest on activities to raise funds. As a charity the National Space Centre makes grants to organisations, provides human resources, provides buildings, facilities and open space, provides advocacy, advice and information and acts as an umbrella or resource body.

== See also ==
- British National Space Centre
- Abbey Pumping Station - adjacent museum
- NSC Creative - a company associated with and based at the National Space Centre that produces full-dome shows
