= CO2M (Sentinel-7) =

Series of European Earth observation satellites for monitoring greenhouse gases

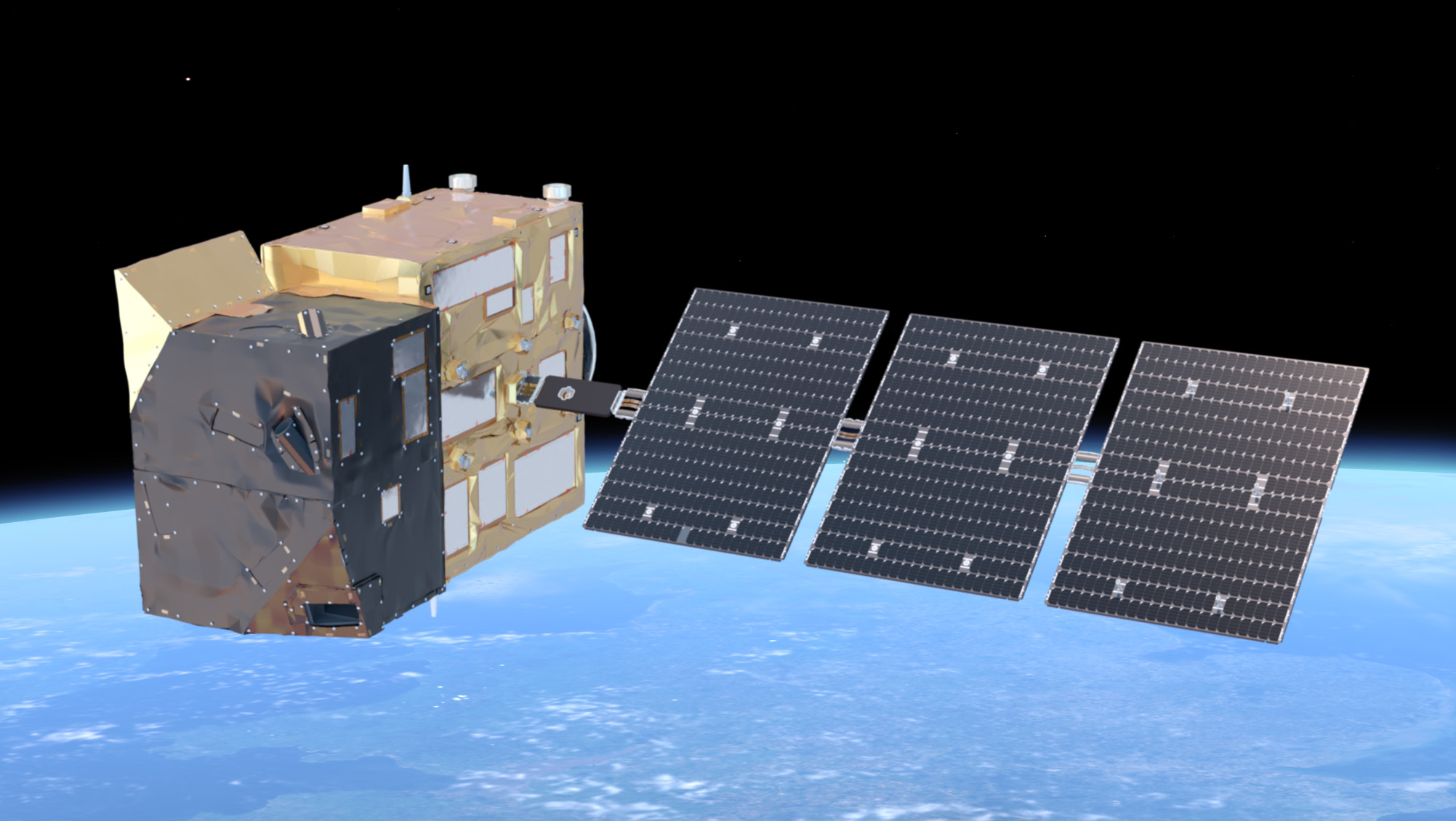
- Country of origin: European Union
- Operator: ESA, EUMETSAT

Production
- Planned: 3
- Launched: 0
- Maiden launch: CO2M-A (Sentinel-7A); November 2027 (planned)

Related spacecraft
- Launch vehicle: Vega C

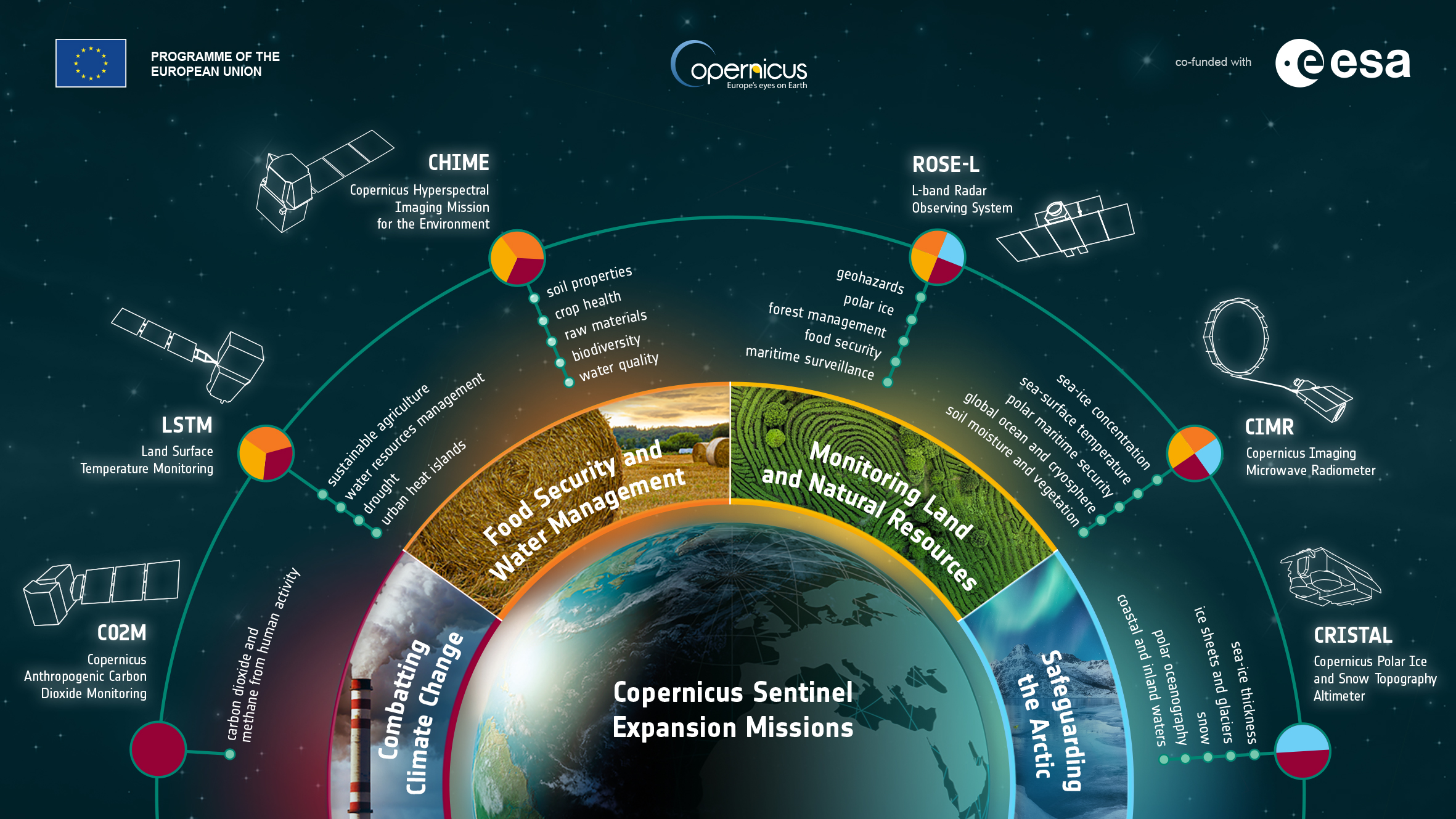
Copernicus Sentinel Expansion Missions

CO2M, also known as Sentinel-7, is a series of future European Earth observation satellites within the EU's Copernicus programme. Expected to have its first launch in November 2027, CO2M will be the first of the Copernicus Sentinel Expansion Missions. Its goal is to provide global measurements of anthropogenic emissions of CO_{2}, CH_{4}, and NO_{2} to support fulfilling the Paris Agreement. The mission consists of at least three satellites: CO2M-A, CO2M-B, and CO2M-C. Each satellite will be equipped with an infrared spectrometer, a multi-angle polarimeter, and a cloud imager.

== See also ==
- List of European Space Agency programmes and missions
