= CO2M-C (Sentinel-7C) =

European Earth observation satellite for monitoring greenhouse gases

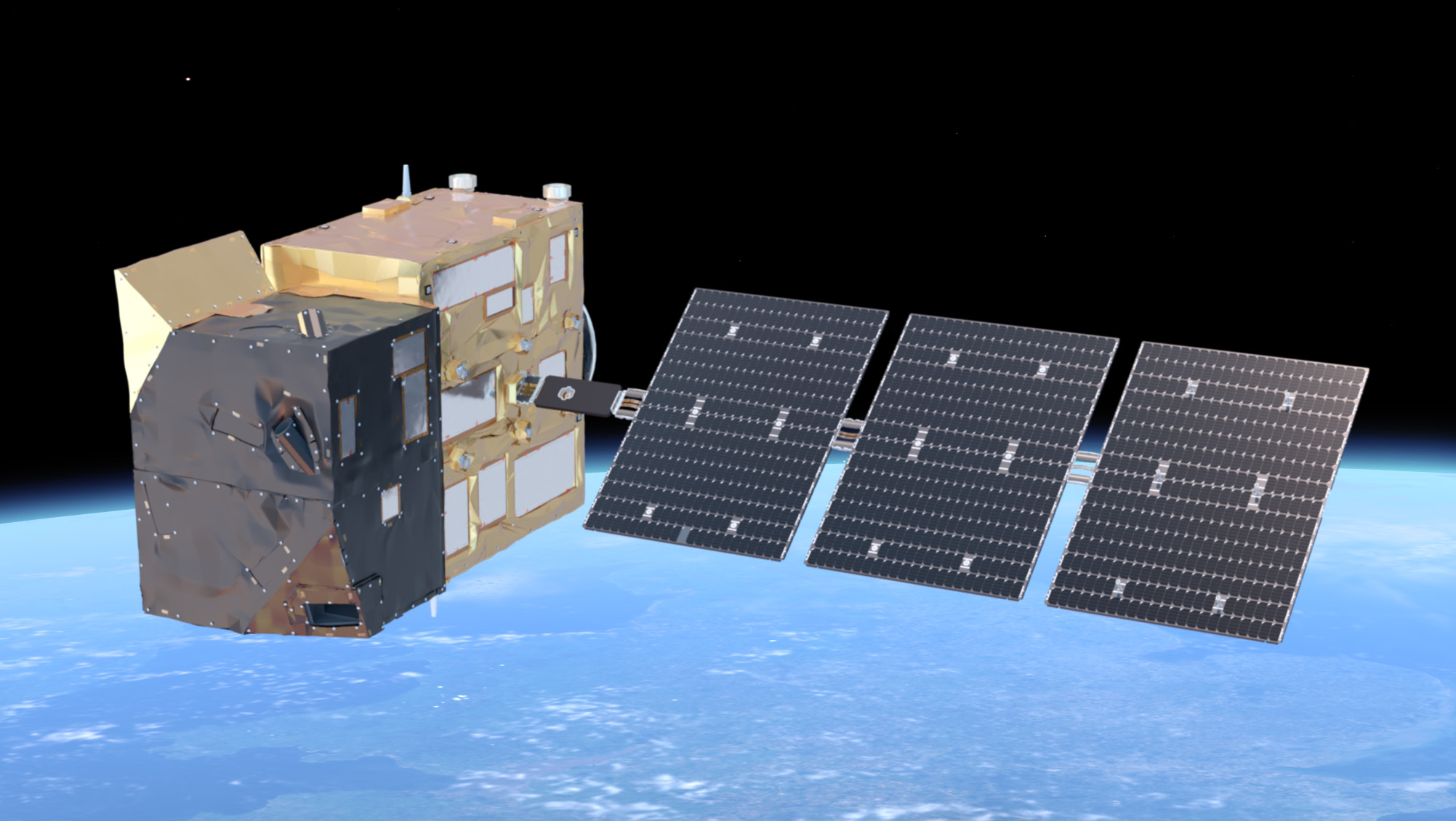
- Names: CO2M-C, Sentinel-7C
- Mission type: Earth observation satellite
- Operator: ESA, EUMETSAT

Start of mission
- Launch date: 2029 (planned)
- Rocket: Vega C
- Launch site: Guiana Space Centre

CO2M-C, also known as Sentinel-7C, is a future European Earth observation satellite within the EU's Copernicus programme, expected to launch in 2029. Its goal is to provide global measurements of anthropogenic emissions of CO_{2}, CH_{4}, and NO_{2} to support fulfilling the Paris Agreement. Like its sister spacecraft CO2M-A and CO2M-B, it will be equipped with an infrared spectrometer, a multi-angle polarimeter, and a cloud imager.

== See also ==
- List of European Space Agency programmes and missions
