= Copernicus Programme =

EU Earth-observation programme

Copernicus programme

Program overview
- Country: European Union
- Organization: European Commission
- Purpose: Earth observation by satellites
- Status: Ongoing

Programme history
- Duration: 2014 - Present
- First flight: Sentinel-1A on 3 April 2014

Copernicus is the Earth observation component of the European Union Space Programme, managed by the European Commission and implemented in partnership with the EU member states, the European Space Agency (ESA), the European Organisation for the Exploitation of Meteorological Satellites (EUMETSAT), the European Centre for Medium-Range Weather Forecasts (ECMWF), the Joint Research Centre (JRC), the European Environment Agency (EEA), the European Maritime Safety Agency (EMSA), Frontex, SatCen, and Mercator Océan.

The programme aims at achieving a global, continuous, autonomous, high quality, wide range Earth observation capacity, providing accurate, timely and easily accessible information to, among other things, improve the management of the environment, understand and mitigate the effects of climate change, and ensure civil security.

Since 2021, Copernicus is a component of the EU Space Programme, which aims to bolster the EU Space policy in the fields of Earth Observation, Satellite Navigation, Connectivity, Space Research, and Innovation and supports investments in critical infrastructure and disruptive technologies.

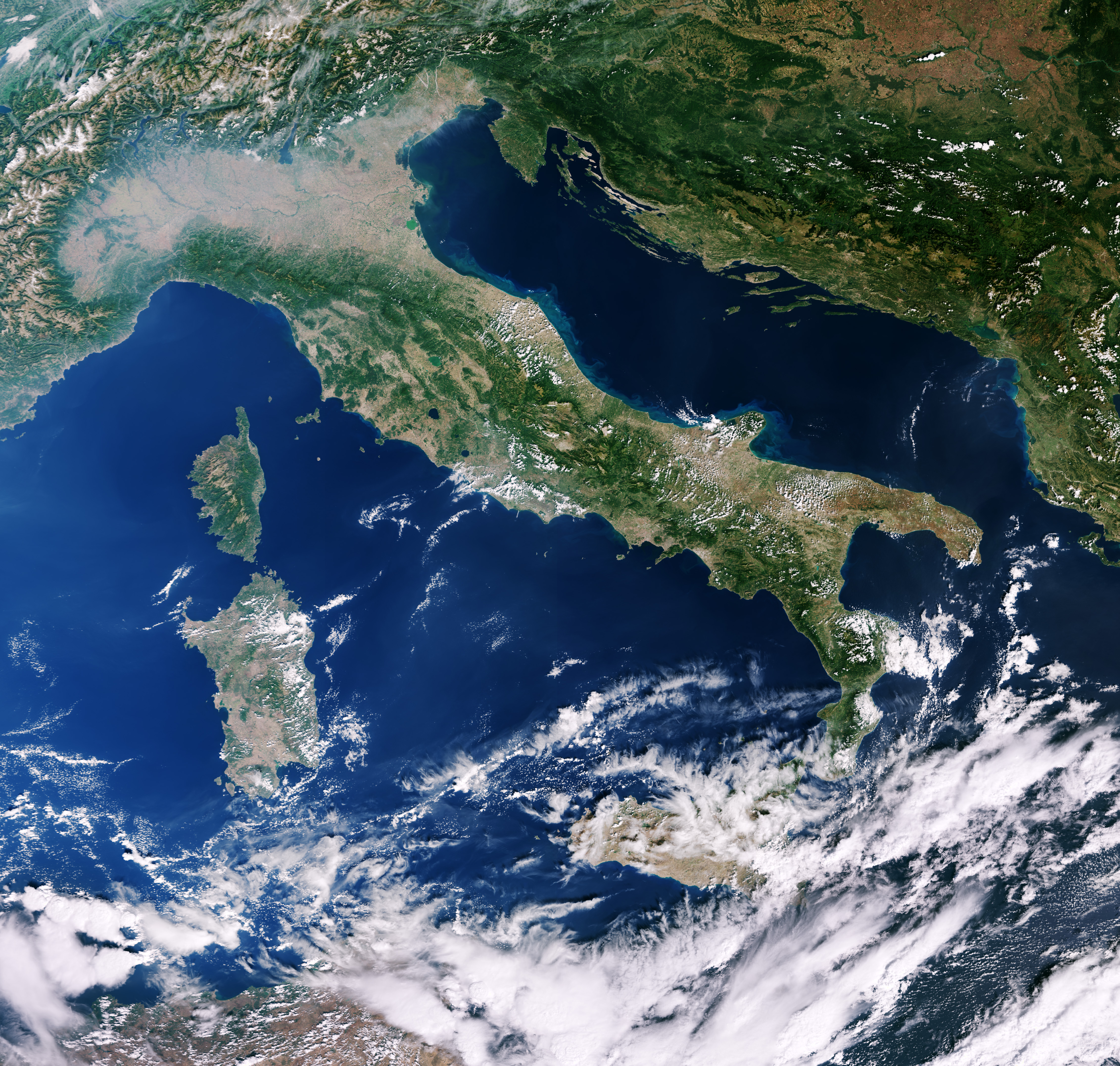
Italian Peninsula and the Mediterranean Sea, image captured by Copernicus Sentinel-3A on 28 September 2016

== Program definition ==
The objective for Copernicus is to use vast amount of global data from satellites and from ground-based, airborne and seaborne measurement systems to produce timely and quality information, services and knowledge, and to provide autonomous and independent access to information in the domains of environment and security on a global level in order to help service providers, public authorities and other international organizations improve the quality of life for the citizens of Europe. In other words, it pulls together all the information obtained by the Copernicus environmental satellites, air and ground stations and sensors to provide a comprehensive picture of the "health" of Earth.

One of the benefits of the Copernicus programme is that the data and information produced in the framework of Copernicus are made available free-of-charge to all its users and the public, thus allowing downstream services to be developed.

The services offered by Copernicus cover six main interacting themes: atmosphere, marine, land, climate, emergency and security.

Copernicus builds upon three components:

- The space component (observation satellites and associated ground segment with missions observing land, atmospheric and oceanographic parameters). This comprises two types of satellite missions, ESA's six families of dedicated Sentinel (space missions) and missions from other space agencies, called Contributing Missions;
- In-situ measurements (ground-based and airborne data-gathering networks providing information on oceans, continental surface and atmosphere);
- Services developed and managed by Copernicus and offered to its users and public in general.

It was named after the scientist and observer Nicolaus Copernicus (1473 –1543). Copernicus' theory of the heliocentric universe made a pioneering contribution to modern science.

Its costs during 1998 to 2020 are estimated at €6.7 billion with around €4.3 billion spent in the period 2014 to 2020 and shared between the EU (67%) and ESA (33%) with benefits of the data to the EU economy estimated at €30 billion through 2030. ESA as a main partner has performed much of the design and oversees and co-funds the development of Sentinel missions 1, 2, 3, 4, 5 and 6 with each Sentinel mission consisting of at least 2 satellites and some, such as Sentinel 1, 2 and 3, consisting of 4 satellites. They will also provide the instruments for Meteosat Third Generation and MetOp-SG weather satellites of EUMETSAT where ESA and EUMETSAT will also coordinate the delivery of data from upwards of 30 satellites that form the contributing satellite missions to Copernicus.

== History ==
The Copernicus programme was established by the Regulation (EU) No 377/2014 in 2014, building on the previous EU's Earth monitoring initiative GMES (established by Regulation (EU) No 911/2010). Over a few decades, European and national institutions have made substantial R&D efforts in the field of Earth observation. These efforts have resulted in tremendous achievements but the services and products developed during this period had limitations that were inherent to R&D activities (e.g. lack of service continuity on the long-term). The idea for a global and continuous European Earth observation system was developed under the name of Global Monitoring for Environment and Security (GMES) which was later re-branded into Copernicus after the EU became directly involved in financing and development. It follows and greatly expands on the work of the previous €2.3 billion European Envisat programme which operated from 2002 to 2012. Copernicus moved from R&D to operational services following a phased approach. Pre-operational services (Fast Track Services and Pilot Services) were phased in between 2008 and 2010. Copernicus initial operations began in 2011. Copernicus became fully operational in 2014.

=== Timeline ===
- 19 May 1998: institutions involved in the development of space activities in Europe give birth to GMES through a declaration known as "The Baveno Manifesto". At that time, GMES stands for "Global Monitoring for Environmental Security".
- Year 1999: the name is changed to "Global Monitoring for Environment and Security" (GMES), thus illustrating that the management of the environment also has security implications.
- 2001: at the occasion of the Gothenburg Summit, the Heads of State and Government request that "the Community contribute to establishing by 2008 a European capacity for Global Monitoring for Environment and Security".
- October 2002: the nature and scope of the "Security" component of GMES are defined as addressing prevention of and response to crises related to natural and technological risk, humanitarian aid and international cooperation, monitoring of compliance with international treaties for conflict prevention, humanitarian and rescue tasks, peacekeeping tasks and surveillance of EU borders.
- February 2004: the Commission Communication "GMES: Establishing a GMES capacity by 2008" introduces an Action Plan aimed at establishing a working GMES capacity by 2008. In 2004, a Framework Agreement is also signed between EC and ESA, thus providing the basis for a space component of GMES.
- May 2005: the Commission Communication "GMES: From Concept to Reality" establishes priorities for the roll-out of GMES services in 2008, the initial focus being on land monitoring, marine monitoring and emergency response services, also known as Fast Track Services (FTS). Later services, also known as Pilot Services, are expected to address atmosphere monitoring, security and climate change.
- June 2006: the EC establishes the GMES Bureau, with the primary objective of ensuring the delivery of the priority services by 2008. Other objectives of the GMES Bureau are to address the issues of the GMES governance structure and the long-term financial sustainability of the system.
- May 2007: adoption of the European Space Policy Communication, recognising GMES as a major flagship of the Space Policy.
- September 2008: official launch of the three FTS services and two Pilot services in their pre-operational version at the occasion of the GMES Forum held in Lille, France.
- November 2008: the Commission Communication "GMES: We care for a Safer Planet" establishes a basis for further discussions on the financing, operational infrastructure and effective management of GMES.
- May 2009: the Commission Proposal for a Regulation on "the European Earth Observation Programme (GMES) and its initial operations (2011-2013)" proposes a legal basis for the GMES programme and EC funding of its initial operations.
- November 2010: the regulation on "the European Earth Observation Programme (GMES) and its initial operations (2011-2013)" entered into force.
- June 2011: the Commission presents its proposal for the next multiannual financial framework (MFF) corresponding to the period 2014-2020 (Communication "A Budget for Europe 2020"). In this document, the Commission proposes to foresee the funding of the GMES programme outside the multiannual financial framework after 2014.
- November 2011: The Commission Communication on the "European Earth monitoring programme (GMES) and its operations (from 2014 onwards)" presents the commission's proposals for the future funding, governance and operations of the GMES programme for the period 2014–2020. In particular, the Commission proposes to opt for the creation of a specific GMES fund, similar to the model chosen for the European Development Fund, with financial contributions from all Member States, based on their gross national income (GNI).
- April 2012: The Emergency Management Service – Mapping ("EMS-Mapping") is declared the first fully operational service within the GMES Initial Operations.
- December 2012: the Commission announces the name change to Copernicus.
- October 2014: ESA and European Commission have established a budget for Copernicus Programme covering years 2014–2020 within Multiannual Financial Framework. Budget provided a total of €4.3 billion, including €3.15 billion for ESA to cover operations of the satellite network and construction of the remaining satellites.
- November 2020: launch of Sentinel-6 Michael Freilich to enable the provision of high-precision and timely observations of the topography of the global ocean
- January 2021: the regulation (EU) 2021/696 of the European Parliament and of the Council of 28 April 2021 establishing the Union Space Programme entered into force establishing a budget of €5.421 billion under the Multiannual Financial Framework (MFF) corresponding to the period 2021-2027.
- January 2023: Copernicus Data Space Ecosystem, the new data access, processing and visualization gateway of the Copernicus Programme is launched. Compared to the earlier Copernicus Open Science Hub, this portal now provides new API-s for data access and download (OData, STAC, openEO, Sentinel Hub), a web browser-based visualization and analysis interface (Copernicus Browser), on-board coding interfaces (JupyterLab, openEO) and on-board cloud processing capacity.
- October 2024: UK's decision to re-enter Copernicus after Brexit has been essential to secure funding for the completion of the Copernicus Sentinel Expansion Missions.
- April 2026: ESA, NASA, and various academic institutions perform the Arctic field campaign called "Copernicus Expansion Missions Sea Ice Experiment" in support of the planned CIMR (Sentinel-11), CRISTAL (Sentinel-9), and ROSE-L (Sentinel-12) missions.

== Sentinel satellites ==
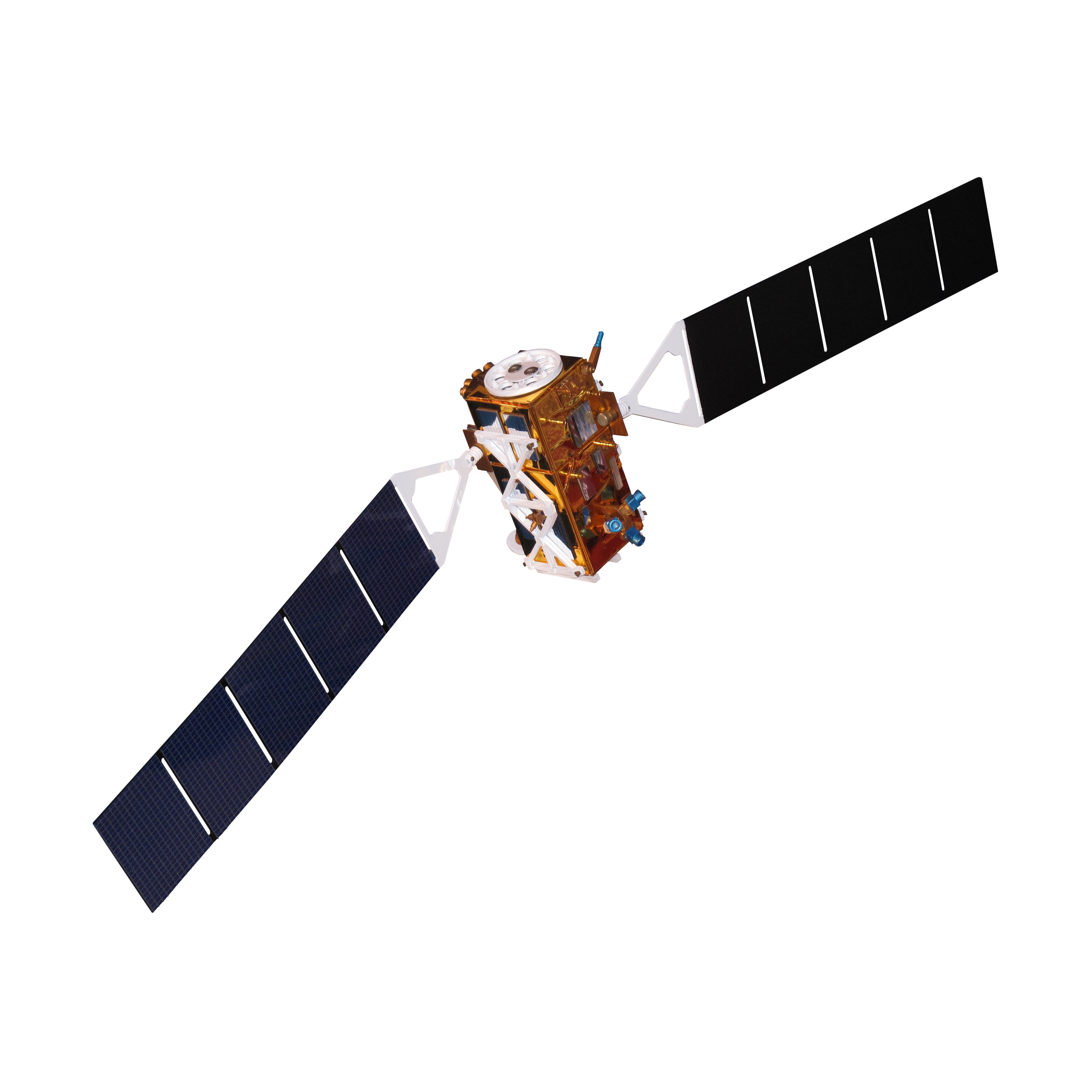
Sentinel 1

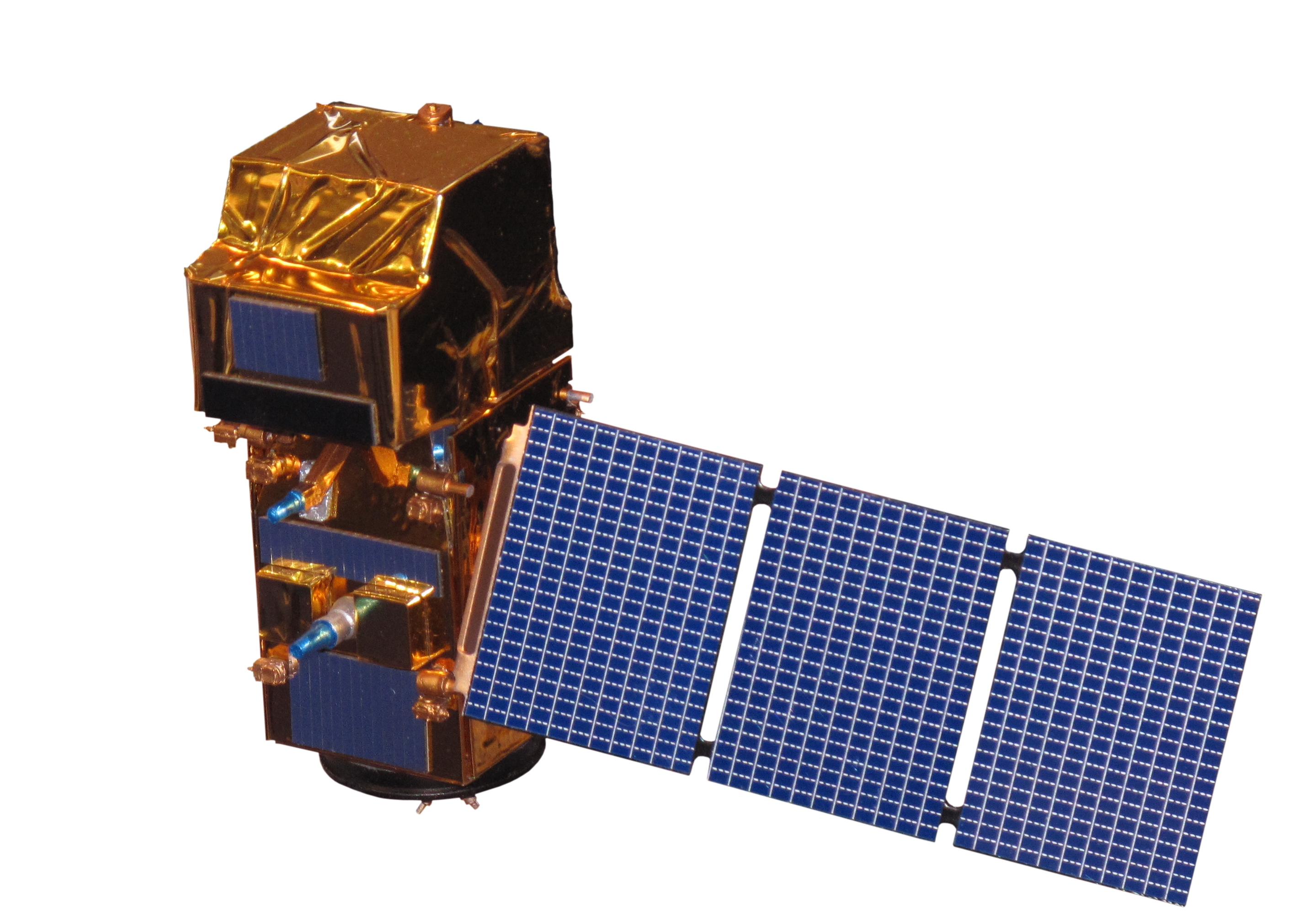
Sentinel 2

Sentinel-3

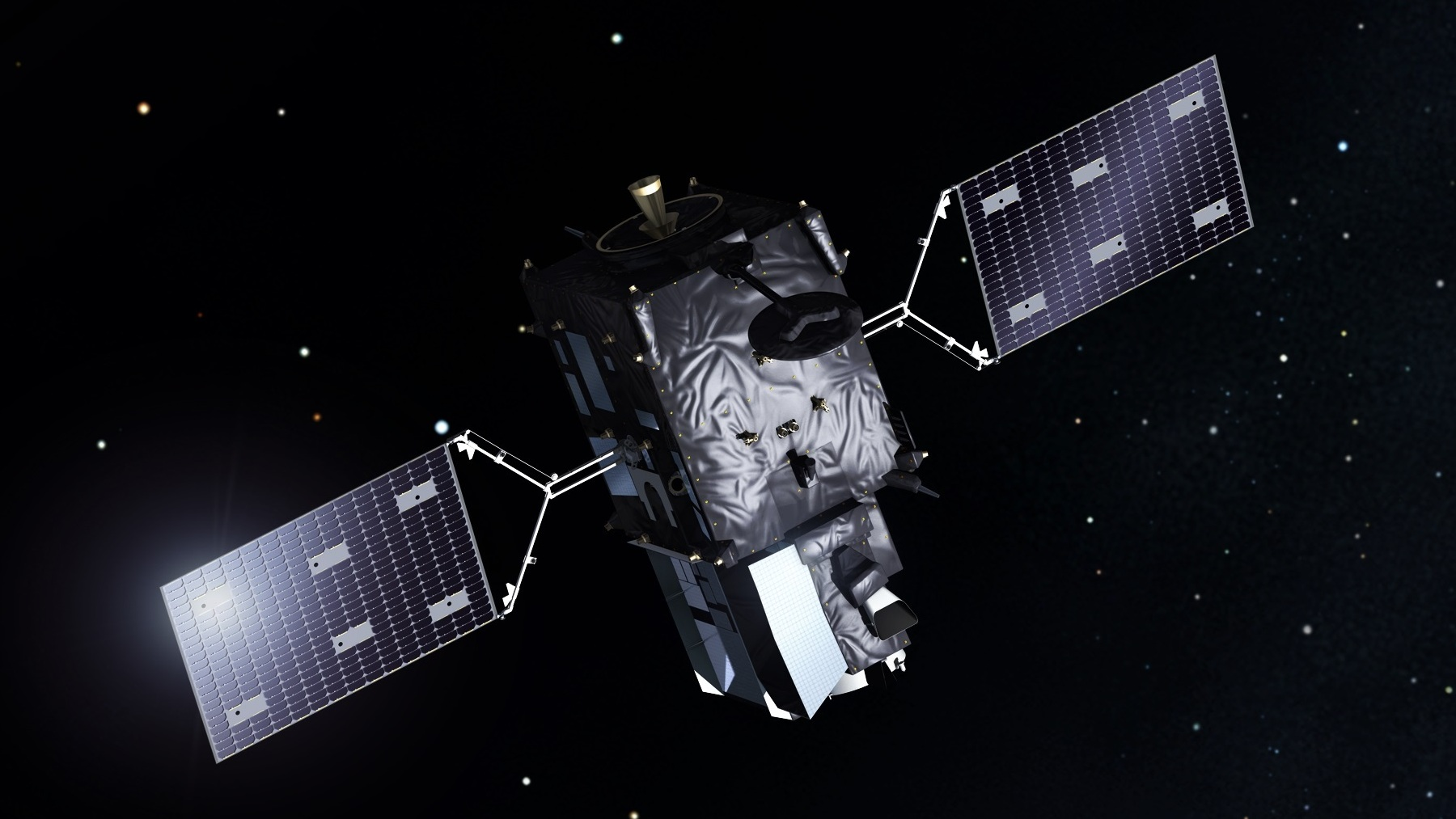
Sentinel 4 on MTG-S

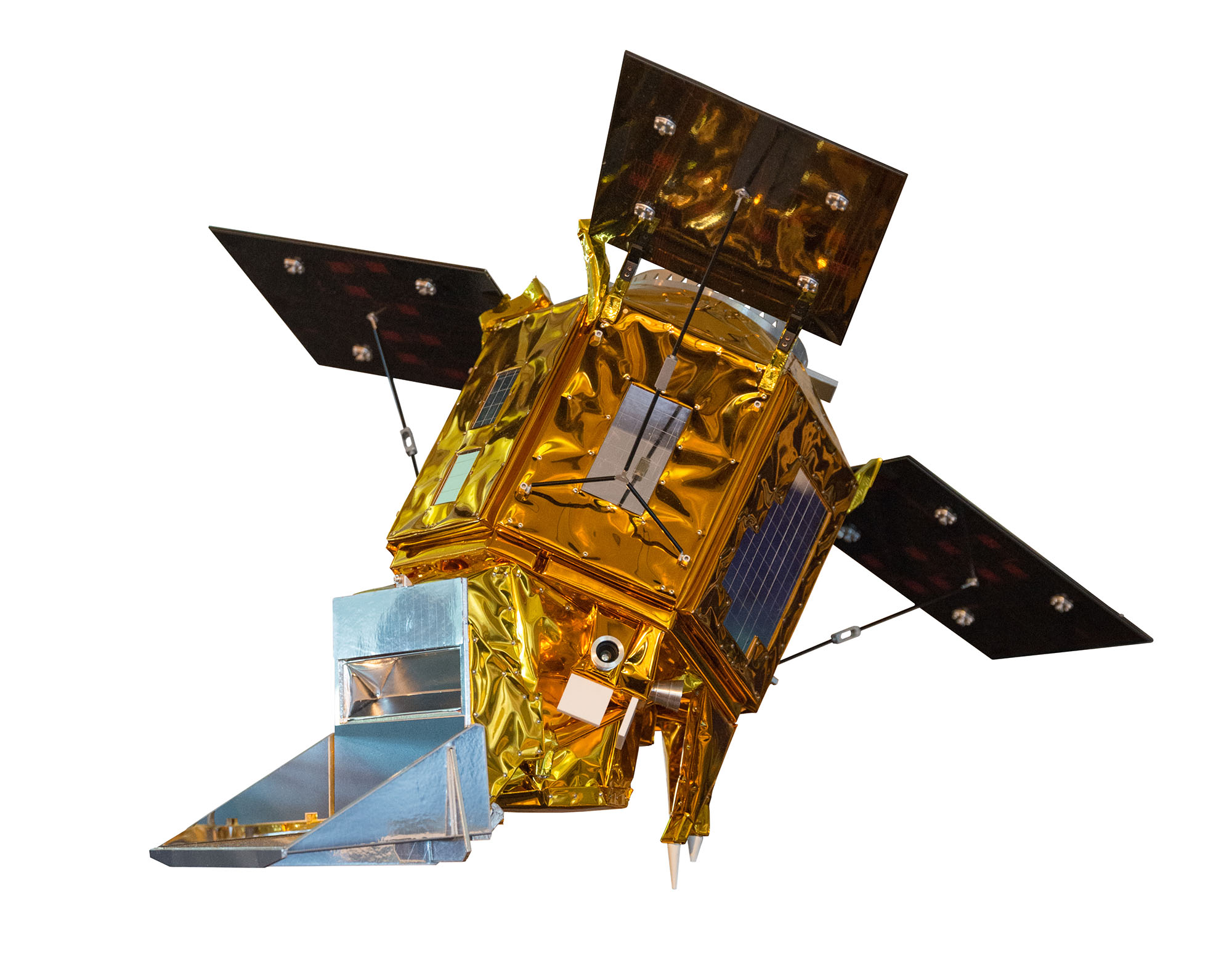
Sentinel-5P

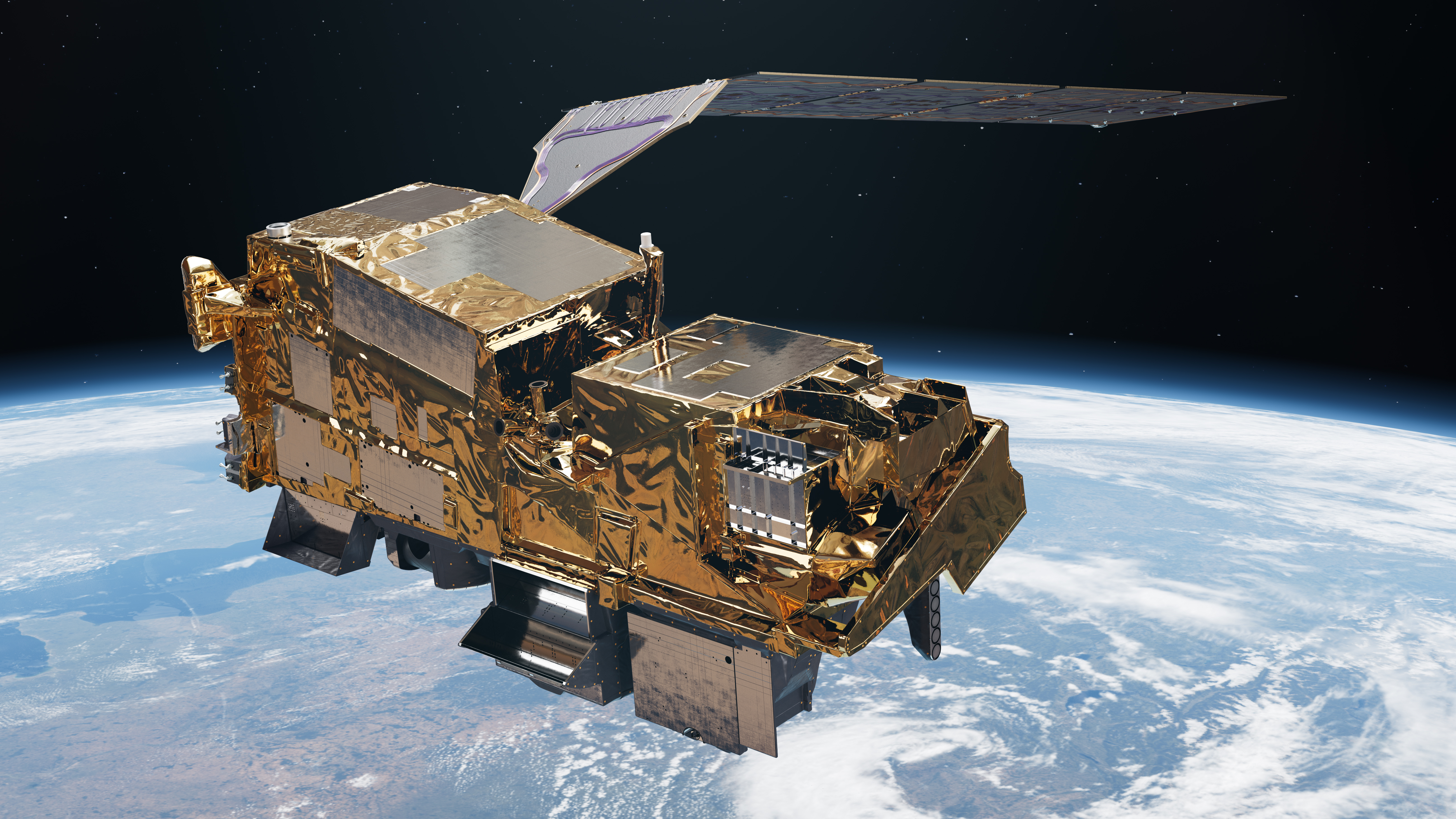
Sentinel-5A on MetOp-SG

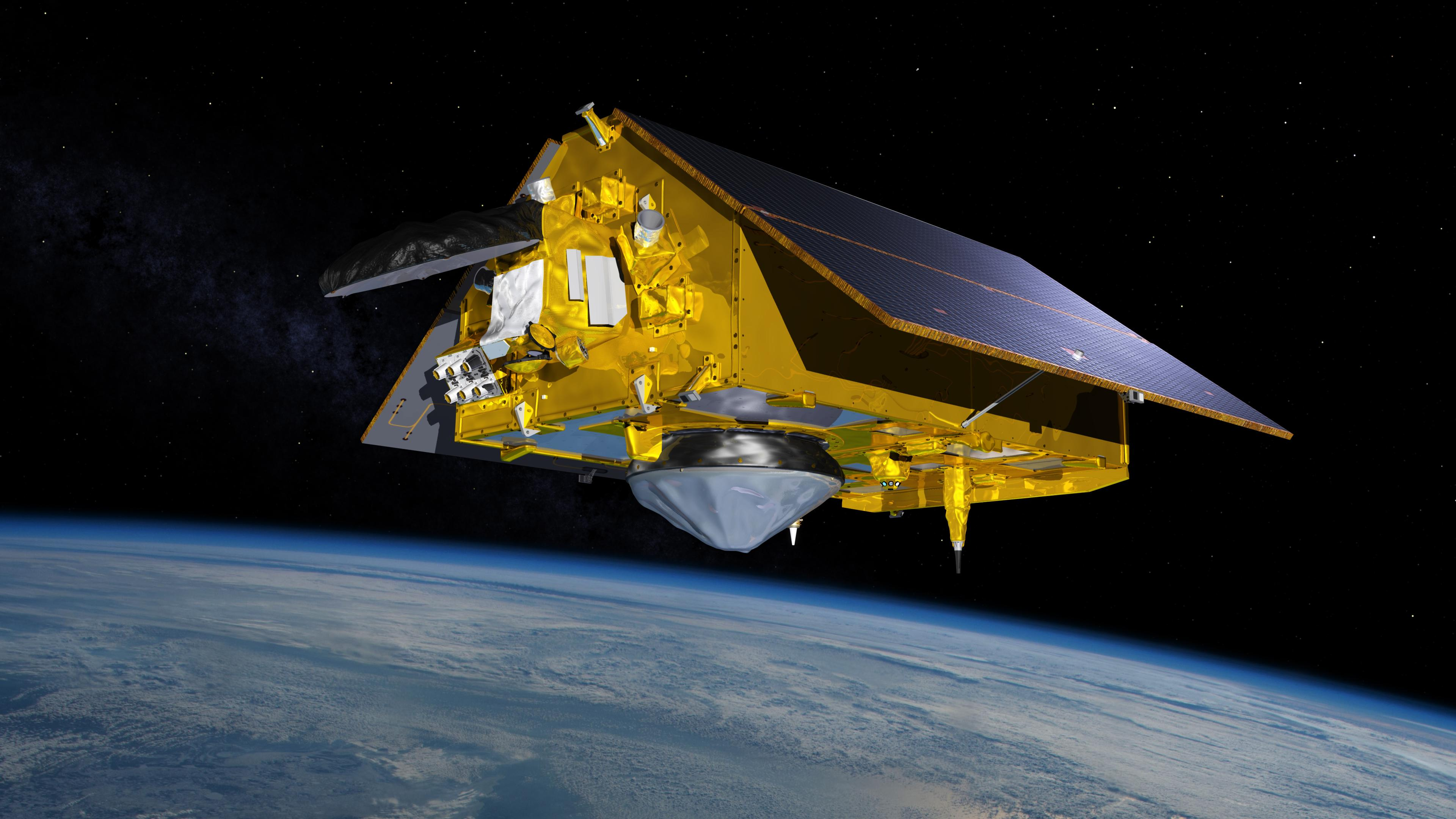
Sentinel-6B

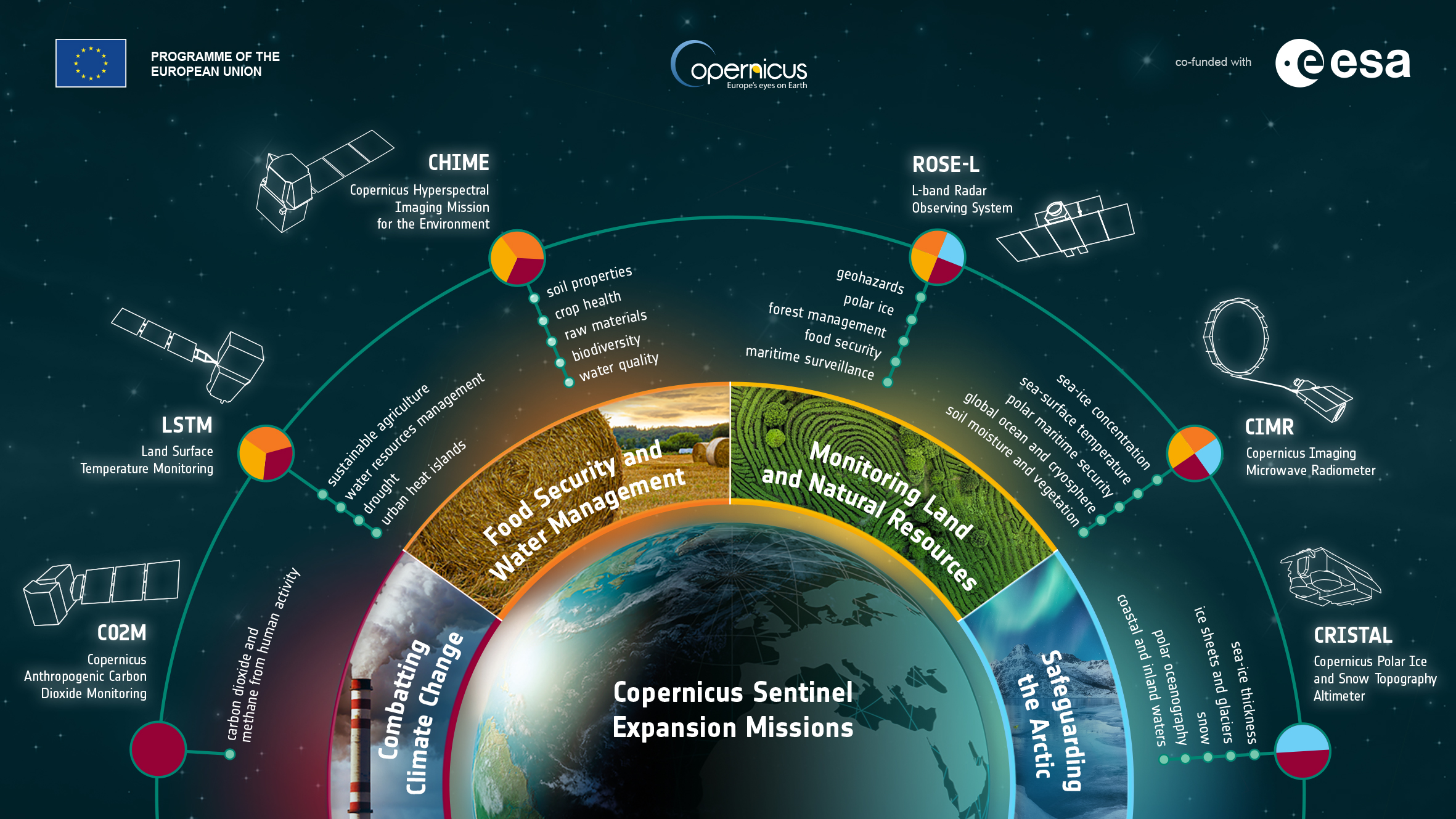
Copernicus Sentinel Expansion missions

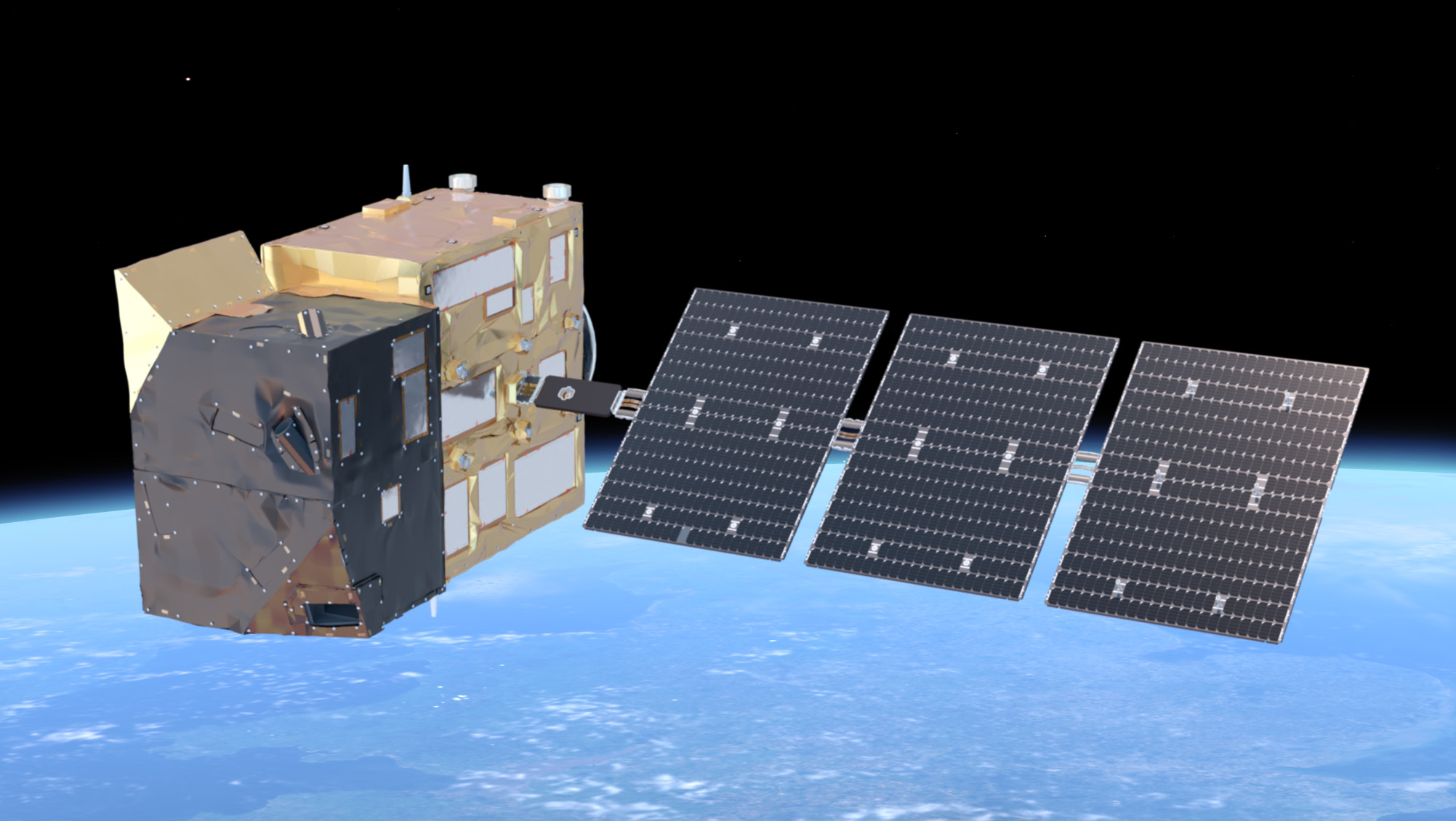
CO2M (Sentinel-7)

The European Space Agency (ESA) is currently operating seven missions under the Sentinel programme (Sentinel 1, 2, 3, 4, 5P, 5, 6). The Sentinel missions include radar and super-spectral imaging for land and ocean as well as atmospheric monitoring. Each Sentinel mission except Sentinel-5P is based on a constellation of at least two satellites to fulfill and revisit the coverage requirements for each mission, providing robust datasets for all Copernicus services.

In preparation for the second-generation of Copernicus (Copernicus Sentinel Expansion Missions), six expansion missions (Sentinel-7 to 12) are being developed by ESA to address EU Policy and gaps in Copernicus user needs, and to increase the current capabilities of the Copernicus Space Component. The decision by the UK to re-enter the EU's Copernicus programme after Brexit has been essential to secure funding for completion of the Expansion Missions.

=== Sentinel-1 ===
Sentinel-1 provides all-weather, day and night radar imaging for land and ocean services with a maximum resolution of 5 m. The first two satellites were launched aboard Europeanised Soyuz rockets from Guiana Space Centre.

- Sentinel-1A successfully launched on 3 April 2014.
- Sentinel-1B successfully launched on 25 April 2016. Mission declared as ended on 3 August 2022 after a hardware failure.
- Sentinel-1C successfully launched on 5 December 2024 on a Vega-C launch vehicle.
- Sentinel-1D successfully launched on 4 November 2025 on the third commercial flight of the Ariane 6 rocket from Guiana Space Centre.

=== Sentinel-2 ===
Sentinel-2 provides high-resolution optical multi-spectral imaging for land services (e.g. imagery of vegetation, soil and water cover, inland waterways and coastal areas) down to a resolution of 10 m. Sentinel-2 also provides information for emergency services. The first 3 satellites launched aboard Vega rockets from Guiana Space Centre.

- Sentinel-2A successfully launched on 23 June 2015. While initially meant to retire after the commissioning of Sentinel-2C, the satellite instead began a year-long trial mission in early 2025, to study the usefulness of, for the first time ever, having three Sentinel satellites of the same type working together
- Sentinel-2B successfully launched on 7 March 2017
- Sentinel-2C successfully launched on 5 September 2024
- Sentinel-2D is expected to launch in 2028 on Vega C

=== Sentinel-3 ===
Sentinel-3 provides ocean and global land monitoring services via multi-spectral imaging, radiometers, and radar altimeters. First two satellites were launched by a Eurockot Rokot vehicle from the Plesetsk Cosmodrome.

- Sentinel-3A successfully launched on 16 February 2016
- Sentinel-3B successfully launched on 25 April 2018
- Sentinel-3C successfully launched on 15 September 2026 on Vega C from Guiana Space Centre
- Sentinel-3D is expected to launch not earlier than 2028

=== Sentinel-4 ===
Sentinel-4, Europe's first hyperspectral sounding mission in GEO, provides data for atmospheric composition monitoring for air quality and other purposes as a payload upon Meteosat Third Generation satellites

- Sentinel-4A successfully launched on 1 July 2025 aboard the MTG-S1 satellite on a Falcon 9 launch vehicle from the Kennedy Space Center in Florida
- Sentinel-4B is expected to launch not earlier than 2032

=== Sentinel-5P ===
Sentinel-5 Precursor successfully launched on 13 October 2017 on a Eurockot Rokot vehicle from Plesetsk. It carries the Tropomi spectrometer go measure pollutants (including methane) and aerosols in the atmosphere. The primary purpose of this mission is to reduce the data gap (especially in SCIAMACHY atmospheric observations) between the loss of Envisat in 2012, and the launch of Sentinel-5A (then scheduled for 2021)

=== Sentinel-5 ===
Sentinel-5 will also provide data for atmospheric composition monitoring

- Sentinel-5A successfully launched on 13 August 2025 from Guiana Space Centre on Ariane 6 aboard the first EUMETSAT Polar System Second Generation spacecraft MetOp-SG-A1
- Sentinel-5B is expected to launch in 2033 on EPS-SG-A2

=== Sentinel-6 ===
Sentinel-6 is intended to provide continuity in high precision altimetry sea level measurements as part of the Jason satellite series following the Jason-3 satellite.

- Sentinel-6A Michael Freilich successfully launched on 21 November 2020 on Falcon 9 launch vehicle from Vandenberg SLC-4E in California.
- Sentinel-6B successfully launched on 17 November 2025 on Falcon 9.
- Sentinel-6C is expected to launch not earlier than 2032

=== CO2M (Sentinel-7) ===
CO2M (Sentinel-7), anthropogenic CO_{2} emissions monitoring

- CO2M-A is expected to launch in 2027 on a Vega C rocket
- CO2M-B is expected to launch in 2028 on a Vega C rocket
- CO2M-C is expected to launch in 2029 on a Vega C rocket

=== LSTM (Sentinel-8) ===
LSTM (Sentinel-8), high spatio-temporal resolution land surface temperature

- LSTM-A is expected to launch in 2028
- LSTM-B is expected to launch in 2031

=== CRISTAL (Sentinel-9) ===
CRISTAL (Sentinel-9), Copernicus Polar Ice and Snow Topography Altimeter

- CRISTAL-A is expected to launch in 2027 or 2028
- CRISTAL-B is expected to launch in the 2030s

=== CHIME (Sentinel-10) ===
CHIME (Sentinel-10), Copernicus Hyperspectral Imaging Mission for the Environment

- CHIME-A is expected to launch in 2028
- CHIME-B is expected to launch in 2030

=== CIMR (Sentinel-11) ===
CIMR (Sentinel-11), Copernicus Imaging Microwave Radiometer

- CIMR-A is expected to launch in 2029
- CIMR-B is expected to launch in 2031

=== ROSE-L (Sentinel-12) ===
ROSE-L (Sentinel-12), Radar Observing System for Europe – L-band SAR

- ROSE-L A is expected to launch in 2028 or 2029
- ROSE-L B is expected to launch in 2031

== Contributing missions ==
Before the Sentinel missions provide data to Copernicus, numerous existing or planned space missions provide or will provide data useful to the provision of Copernicus services. These missions are often referred to as "Copernicus Contributing Missions (CCMs)":

- ERS: the European Remote Sensing Satellite ERS-1 (1991–2000) was ESA's first Earth observation satellite. ERS-2 (1995–2011) provided data related to ocean surface temperature, winds at sea and atmospheric ozone.
- Envisat (2002–2012): launched in 2002, ESA's Envisat was the largest civilian Earth Observation spacecraft ever built. It carried sophisticated optical and radar instruments among which the Advanced Synthetic Aperture Radar (ASAR) and the Medium Resolution Imaging Spectrometer (MERIS). Envisat provided continuous observation and monitoring of the Earth's land, atmosphere, oceans and ice caps. After losing contact with the satellite on 8 April 2012, ESA formally announced the end of Envisat's mission on 9 May 2012.
- Earth Explorers: ESA's Earth Explorers are smaller research missions dedicated to specific aspects of Earth environment. Earth Explorer missions focus on research of the atmosphere, biosphere, hydrosphere, cryosphere and the Earth's interior with the overall emphasis on learning more about the interactions between these components and the impact that human activity is having on natural Earth processes. The following two of the nine missions selected for implementation currently (as of 2020) contribute to Copernicus:
  - SMOS (Soil Moisture and Ocean Salinity), launched on 2 November 2009.
  - CryoSat-2 (the measurement of the thickness of floating ice), launched on 8 April 2010.
- MSG: the Meteosat Second Generation is a joint project between ESA and EUMETSAT.
- MetOp: MetOp is Europe's first polar-orbiting satellite dedicated to operational meteorology. MetOp is a series of three satellites launched sequentially over 12 years from October 2006 to November 2018. The series provides data for both operational meteorology and climate studies until at least 2027.
- French SPOT: SPOT (Satellite Pour l'Observation de la Terre) consists of a series of earth observation satellites providing high-resolution images of the Earth. SPOT-4 and SPOT-5 include sensors called VEGETATION able to monitor continental ecosystems.
- German TerraSAR-X: TerraSAR-X is an Earth observation satellite providing high quality topographic information. TerraSAR-X data has a wide range of applications (e.g. land use / land cover mapping, topographic mapping, forest monitoring, emergency response monitoring, and environmental monitoring).
- Italian COSMO-SkyMed: the COnstellation of small Satellites for the Mediterranean basin Observation is an Earth observation satellite system that consists of (in the 1st generation) four satellites equipped with Synthetic-aperture radar (SAR) sensors. Applications include seismic hazard analysis, environmental disaster monitoring and agricultural mapping. As of 2020, a second-generation of COSMO-SkyMed satellites (called Cosmo-Skymed 2nd generation) is under development.
- UK and international DMC: the Disaster Monitoring Constellation (DMC) is a constellation of remote-sensing satellites. There have been eight satellites in the DMC-program; 3 are currently (as of 2020) active. The constellation provides emergency Earth imaging for disaster relief under the International Charter for Space and Major Disasters.
- French-American OSTM/Jason-2 (2008-2019): the OSTM/JASON-2 satellite provided precise measurements of ocean surface topography, surface wind speed, and wave height; as this type of measurement is a crucial requirement for the Copernicus Marine Services, the European Commission has included this type of mission in its latest communication on the future Copernicus Space Component as Sentinel-6.
- French Pléiades: the Pléiades constellation consists of two satellites providing very high-resolution images of the Earth.
- Planet Labs, a commercial satellite imagery provider whose goal is to image the entirety of the planet daily to monitor changes and pinpoint trends.
- Prométhée Earth Intelligence, a French Earth Observation satellite operator that will provide hyperspectral and multispectral images with its planned Japetus constellation of 20 satellites.
- OroraTech, a Germany-based commercial earth observation provider focused on wildfire situational awareness, is delivering its FOREST constellation thermal-infrared data (MWIR, 2x LWIR).
- HiVE, a German satellite constellation for thermal imaging
- Hydra, a Spanish satellite constellation for thermal imaging

Data provided by non-European satellite missions (e.g. Landsat, GOSAT, Radarsat-2) can also be used by Copernicus.

- DigitalGlobe, an American commercial vendor of space imagery and geospatial content, provides imagery from satellites with a true maximum resolution of up to 25 cm. The DigitalGlobe tasking constellation currently includes GeoEye-1, WorldView-1, WorldView-2 and WorldView-3. Archive data is also available from Ikonos and QuickBird.
- LANDSAT program (8 satellites, 3 active).
- GOSAT program (2 satellites, 2 active).
- Radarsat-2 satellite.

== In-Situ Coordination ==
GMES In-Situ Coordination (GISC) was a FP7 funded initiative, lasted for three years (January 2010 – December 2012) and was coordinated by the European Environment Agency (EEA). Since 2014 EEA has been responsible for Copernicus In-Situ coordination under the Contribution Agreement between the EU (represented by the European Commission) and the EEA, signed 1 December 2014.

In situ data are all data from sources other than Earth observation satellites. Consequently, all ground-based, air-borne, and ship/buoy-based observations and measurements that are needed to implement and operate the Copernicus services are part of the in-situ component. In-situ data are indispensable; they are assimilated into forecasting models, provide calibration and validation of space-based information, and contribute to analysis or filling gaps not available from space sources.

GISC was undertaken with reference to other initiatives, such as INSPIRE (Infrastructure for Spatial Information in the European Community) and SEIS (Shared Environmental Information System) as well as existing coordination and data exchange networks. The coordinated access to data retains the capacity to link directly data providers and the service providers because it is based on the principles of SEIS and INSPIRE. The implementation of INSPIRE is embedded in the synergies and meta-data standards that were used in GISC. Data and information aims to be managed as close as possible to its source in order to achieve a distributed system, by involving countries and existing capacities that maintain and operate the required observation infrastructure.

== Services component ==
Copernicus services are dedicated to the monitoring and forecasting of the Earth's subsystems. They contribute directly to the monitoring of climate change. Copernicus services also address emergency management (e.g. in case of natural disaster, technological accidents or humanitarian crises) and security-related issues (e.g. maritime surveillance, border control).

Copernicus services address six main thematic areas:

- Emergency Management Service (see video available on the Copernicus.eu website: Copernicus Emergency Management Service). The service was declared operational on 1 April 2012.
- Land Monitoring (see video available on the Copernicus.eu website: Copernicus Land Monitoring Service). The service was declared operational on 1 April 2012.
- Marine Environment Monitoring (see video available on the Copernicus.eu website: Copernicus Marine Environment Monitoring Service). The service was declared operational on 1 May 2015.
- Atmosphere Monitoring (see video available on the Copernicus.eu website: Copernicus Atmosphere Monitoring Service). The service was declared operational in July 2015.
- Security (See Copernicus Service for Security Applications)
- Climate Change (see video available on the Copernicus.eu website: Copernicus Climate Change Monitoring Service)

The development of the pre-operational version of the services has been realised by a series of projects launched by the European Commission and partly funded through the EU's 7th Framework Programme (FP7). These projects were geoland2 (land), MyOcean (marine), SAFER (emergency response), MACC and its successor MACC II (atmosphere) and G-MOSAIC (security). Most of these projects also contributed to the monitoring of Climate Change.

- geoland2 started on 1 September 2008. The project covered a wide range of domains such as land use, land cover change, soil sealing, water quality and availability, spatial planning, forest management, carbon storage and global food security.
- MyOcean started on 1 January 2009. It covered themes such as maritime security, oil spill prevention, marine resource management, climate change, seasonal forecast, coastal activities, ice survey and water pollution.
- SAFER started on 1 January 2009. The project addressed three main domains: civil protection, humanitarian aid and Security crises management.
- MACC started on 1 June 2009. The project continued and refined the products developed in the projects GEMS and PROMOTE. A second phase (MACC II) lasted until July 2014 allowing the now operational Copernicus atmospheric monitoring service (CAMS, see above).
- GMOSAIC started on 1 January 2009. Together with the LIMES project Wayback Machine (co-funded by the European Commission under FP6), GMOSAIC specifically dealt with the Security domain of Copernicus addressing topics such as Support to Intelligence and Early Warning and Support to Crisis Management Operations.

== Interaction ==
"The information provided by the Copernicus services can be used by end-users for a wide range of applications in a variety of areas. These include urban area management, sustainable development and nature protection, regional and local planning, agriculture, forestry and fisheries, health, civil protection, infrastructure, transport and mobility, as well as tourism".

Copernicus is the European Union's contribution to the Global Earth Observation System of Systems (GEOSS) thus delivering geospatial information globally.

Some Copernicus services make use of OpenStreetMap data in their maps production.

== Other relevant initiatives ==
Other initiatives will also facilitate the development and functioning of Copernicus services:

- INSPIRE: this initiative aims at building a European spatial data infrastructure beyond national boundaries.
- Urban Atlas: Compiled from thousands of satellite photographs, the Urban Atlas provides detailed and cost-effective digital mapping, ensuring that city planners have the most up-to-date and accurate data available on land use and land cover. The Urban Atlas will enable urban planners to better assess risks and opportunities, ranging from the threat of flooding and the impact of climate change, to identifying new infrastructure and public transport needs. All cities in the EU will be covered by the Urban Atlas by 2011.
- SEIS: The Shared Environmental Information System (SEIS) is a collaborative initiative of the European Commission and the European Environment Agency (EEA) to establish together with the Member States an integrated and shared EU-wide environmental information system.
- Heterogeneous Missions Accessibility, the European Space Agency initiative for interoperability of Earth observation satellite payload data ground segments.

Copernicus is one of three related initiatives that are the subject of the GIGAS (GEOSS, INSPIRE and GMES an Action in Support) harmonization and analysis project under the auspices of the EU 7th Framework Programme.

== Third country participation ==
In addition to the 27 Member States of the European Union, the Copernicus programme allows for the participation at various scope for third country participation. This participation is conducted through agreements with the European Union. One has to distinguish those countries that contribute to the budget and those that agree on exchanging data with the program. Many international partner countries get special access to Sentinel data in exchange for sharing in-situ data from their country. These states are:

2014–2020 budget contributing countries

- Norway
- Switzerland
- Iceland

Data exchange

- United States (from 2015)
- Australia
- Ukraine
- Serbia
- African Union
- Brazil (from 2018)
- Chile (from 2018)
- Colombia (from 2018)
- India (from 2018)
- Canada (from 2022)
- Panama (from 2022)
- Japan (from 2023)

Discussions ongoing with: Argentina, Thailand, Indonesia, Vietnam, China (part of Space Dialogue)

2021–2027 budget contributing countries

- Norway
- Iceland

Enlargement

- United Kingdom: The UK rejoined the programme in 2024.

== See also ==
- CNES
- European Space Technology Platform
- French space program
- Mission Science Division
- German Aerospace Center
- German space programme
- List of ESA programmes and missions
