= Sentinel-4 =

Series of European Earth observation satellite missions

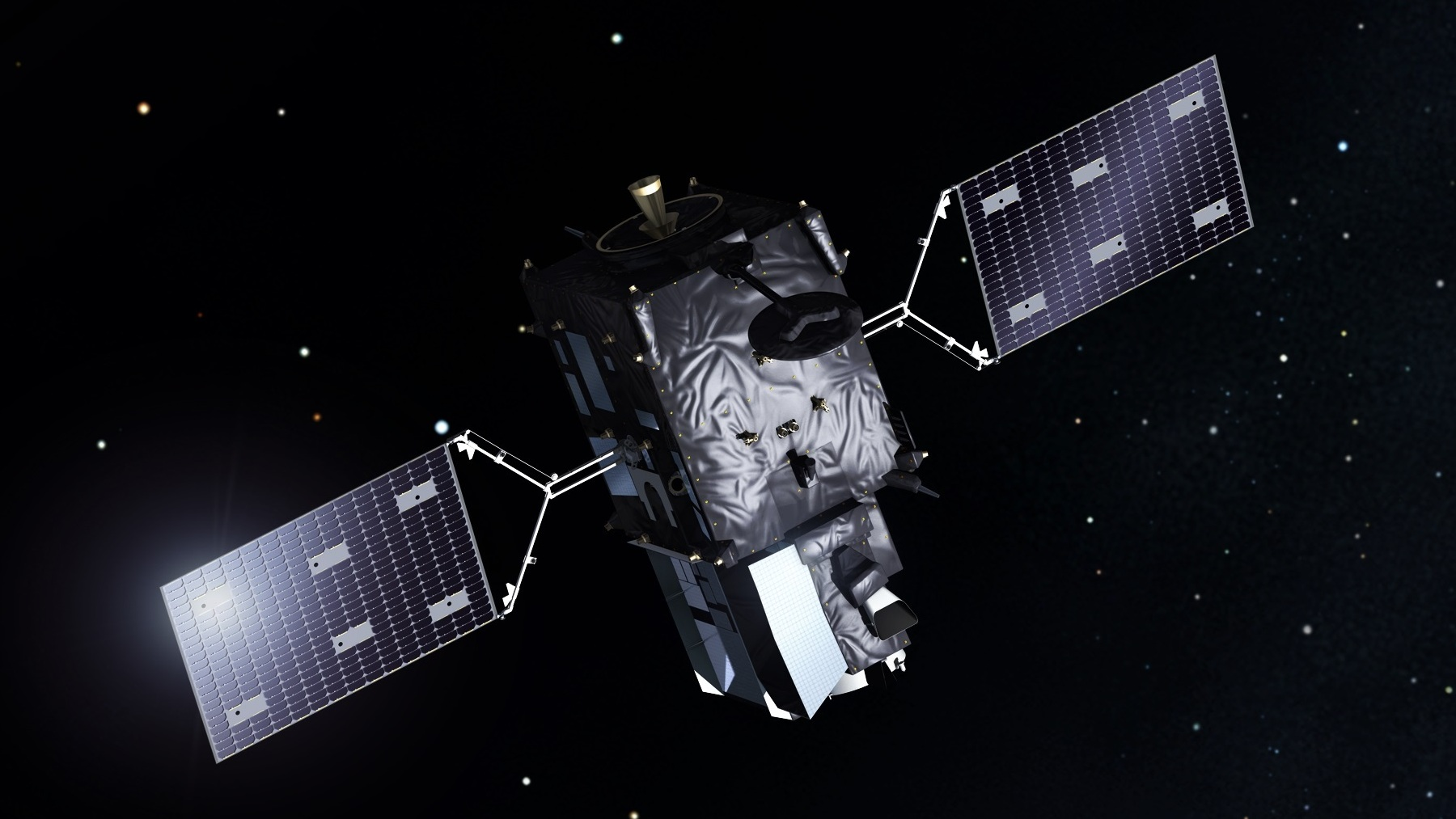
- Manufacturer: Airbus Defence and Space
- Country of origin: European Union
- Operator: EUMETSAT, ESA
- Applications: Earth observation
- Website: https://www.esa.int/Applications/Observing_the_Earth/Copernicus/Sentinel-4

Specifications
- Bus: Meteosat Third Generation-S, Luxor bus
- Constellation: 1
- Launch mass: 3,600 kg (7,937 lb)
- Dimensions: 2.280 × 2.760 × 5.170 m (7.5 × 9.1 × 17.0 ft)
- Power: 2,000 W
- Equipment: UVN imaging spectrometer
- Design life: 8.5 years

Production
- On order: 2
- Built: 1
- Launched: 1
- Maiden launch: 1 July 2025, 21:04 UTC
- Last launch: ~2035

Related spacecraft
- Launch vehicle: Falcon 9 Block 5

Configuration
Sentinel-4 on MTG-S


Sentinel-4 is a series of European Earth observation missions supporting the EU Copernicus Programme. It is the first project to monitor European air quality from geostationary orbit. Sentinel-4 focuses on monitoring of trace gas concentrations and aerosols in the atmosphere to support air-quality near-real time applications, air-quality monitoring, and climate monitoring – specifically with a short revisit period over Europe.

Sentinel-4s are not standalone satellites, but a type of instrument (ultraviolet, visible, and near-infrared imaging spectrometer) mounted on satellites of the MTG-S series of the Meteosat programme in a two-missions-one-satellite approach. The first Sentinel-4 mission (Sentinel-4A) launched in July 2025 aboard the MTG-S1 satellite on Falcon 9.

== Background ==
The Sentinel-5 Precursor, Sentinel-4, and Sentinel-5 missions are complementary elements of a constellation intended to serve the needs of the Copernicus Atmosphere Monitoring Service (CAMS). Sentinel-4 is one of two instruments integrated onboard Meteosat Third Generation Sounder (MTG-S) satellites intended to primarily observe the composition of the Earth's troposphere.

The data gathered will be made available to the Copernicus Programme with the aim of contributing to air quality applications with the Copernicus Atmosphere Services, as well as air quality monitoring efforts over Europe and Northern Africa. As with other aspects of the Copernicus Programme, the Sentinel-4 initiative is funded mostly through the European Union, with the technical design and development under responsibility of the European Space Agency (ESA).

== Mission objectives ==
The main mission objective is to observe the concentration of air quality parameters in the atmosphere above Europe and North Africa, including ozone, nitrogen dioxide, sulfur dioxide, glyoxal, and formaldehyde. The information gathered will be used to further inform decision-makers.

For the detection and measurement of these atmospheric characteristics, two payload instruments have been designed: the Ultra-Violet and Near Infra-Red Multispectral Spectrometer (S4 UVN) and the Infra-Red Sounder (IRS). The two instruments will be embarked on two Eumetsat Meteosat Third Generation Sounder (MTG-S) satellites due to be launched in 2025 and 2034.

== Satellite platform ==
=== Meteosat Third Generation (MTG) ===
Meteosat Third Generation is the third generation of meteorological satellites and is developed by Thales Alenia Space (TAS) under the responsibility of Eumetsat and ESA. It is the ‘next generation’ for numerical weather predication and nowcasting. The unprecedented high-resolution and profiling technology will yield a vast improvement in weather forecasting reliability for the medium and long term. Eumetsat heads up the operations of the programme and also ensures provision of meteorological data and services to European as well as International users and improved imaging capability to the scientific community.

“The objective of the MTG system is to provide continuous high-resolution observation data and geophysical parameters of the Earth system derived from direct measurements from the radiation it emits and reflects using satellite-based sensors from a geostationary orbit. Thanks to advances in technology, MTG, compared to the current MSG system, will also provide a more powerful tool by contributing significant improvements to the existing service with an improved imagery mission and by introducing new sounding and lightning missions from a geostationary orbit” – a quote from the MTG publication produced and published by OHB System AG.

=== Meteosat Third Generation Sounder (MTG-S) Satellite ===
The MTG-S satellites make up 2 of the 6 satellites in the MTG satellite fleet. The MTG-S satellites are mounted on common 3-axis stabilised platforms and are dedicated to sounding applications, including the integration of the Sentinel 4 instrument (S4-UVN) and two other instruments called MTG-IRS and RMU.

== Instruments on MTG-S ==
- Sentinel 4 Ultraviolet, Visible and Near-infrared sounder (UVN)
- Infra-Red Sounder (IRS)
- Radiation Monitoring Unit (RMU)

== Sentinel 4 instrument ==
The Sentinel 4 UVN multispectral spectrometer is a hyperspectral spectrometer operating with spectral bands within the solar reflectance spectrum. For the UVVIS part the range is between 305 nm to 500 nm with a resolution of 0.5 nm and for the NIR part the range is 750 nm to 775 nm with a resolution of 0.12 nm. These bands work in combination with low polarization sensitivity and high radiometric accuracy. The instrument design allows for an east–west scan revisit time of approximately 1 hour, covering most of Europe and Northern Africa. With around 570 spatial samples in the east–west spatial dimension a corresponding scan rate (spatial sample rate) of approximately 8 km every 6 seconds is possible (around 1.3 km/s).

At sunrise in the East the instrument will only scan the illuminated part of the Earth, allowing a total scan time of less than 1 hour. The same applies to the west in the evening. During Autumn-Winter area of coverage is shifted by 5 degrees twice, which optimizes for the illuminated areas and during Winter-Spring it is reversed. The instrument is deployed to the MTG satellite which will be in a Geostationary Earth Orbit (GEO) with longitude of around 0 degrees at an attitude in the region of 36000 km above the Equator. Deployment to the satellite is optimized and will allow Earth radiance as well as Sun irradiance and thermal fields of view, clear and unhindered by obstruction. By design, via other components of the satellite, other stray light from sun or Earth is kept to a minimum. Minimizing the stray light is very important with respect to the class of this instrument, involving the requirement for level 1B and 2 data product accuracies where the sensitivity to stray light is very high. The MTG-S satellite performs Yaw-flip maneuvers at the Equinoxes in order to optimize the instrument thermal environment. Through the availability of two Charged-Coupled Devices (CCDs) on board the instrument, the UV and NIR spectral elements can be separately recorded. Each CCD observes both the spectral dimension and the north–south spatial dimension. The instrument Earth polarization sensitivity has to be less than 1% with respect to the GEO orbital conditions.

The instrument is also equipped with 2 solar diffusers that will minimize spectral and spatial anomalies and which would otherwise interfere with the detection and retrieval of the atmospheric trace gases. The instrument is also equipped with a 5W White Light Source (WLS) as part of its calibration assembly.

In the UVVIS range between 315 nm and 500 nm, the maximum relative radiometric spectral accuracy error over a spectral window width of 3 nm is required to be smaller than 0.05%. The in-flight absolute radiometric accuracy of the Earth spectral radiance and of the Sun irradiance is required to be better than 3% with a goal of 2%. All values apply on a one-sigma confidence level. As the instrument ages in the space environment there may be some detectable limitations on the accuracy by the end of the currently expected Sentinel-4 mission lifetime of 10 years.

The S4's UVN is also the first space-borne spectrometer to use dielectric reflection grating. This type of grating was initially developed for the manipulation of laser pulses, but the Fraunhofer Institute of Applied Optics and Precision Engineering in Jena, Germany was able to convert the concept for use on Sentinel-4's spectrometer.

== Other instrument on the same satellite ==
=== Infra-Red Sounder (IRS) ===
IRS is a different instrument from Sentinel 4 which happens to have been launched on the same satellite. It is a Fourier Transform spectrometer. Its task will be to detect Earth's atmospheric gas structure and relay data to the ground for use in more accurate and reliable weather forecasting. OHB System AG is responsible for the design, development, procurement, AIT and delivery of two Flight Models (FM) of the IRS instrument. The Instrument payload will be deployed to two MTG-S satellites, similarly to the S4-UVN instrument.

The IRS is essentially a hyperspectral spectrometer designed to cover the entire Earth with the mission to provide sounding data in two bands, the Long Wave Infra Red (LWIR) 700 cm-1 – 1210 cm-1 and the Mid Wave Infra Red (MWIR) 1600 – 2175 cm-1 with spectral sampling of 0.625 cm-1. Profiles of the circulation and distribution of Earth's atmospheric water vapour and temperatures will be acquired and analysed on a layer by layer basis. This will allow further insight into the complex composition of the Earth's atmosphere as well as its dynamic. The spectral sampling will measure velocity components as part of the data sampling to determine these profiles at varying altitudes above the Earth's surface and with a high rate of spatial sampling and temporal resolution.

The IRS instrument will be able to scan the full circle of the Earth within 1 hour with spatial sampling dimensions of 4 km x 4 km from the Geostationary Earth Orbit (GEO) of the host Meteosat Third Generation Sounder (MTG-S) satellite. The high sampling rate is achieved through the use of a high-resolution telescope and scan mirror assembly operating in the IR spectral range. Further design features of the instrument include the ability to execute observation scenarios on-board autonomously with pre-uploaded scenario information and autonomous calibration including black-body and deep-space views. Observation scenario planning will also allow continuous operation including sun-avoidance capability.

The IRS Mass is 460 kg, it will consume 736.0 W nominally and its detection assembly is cryo-cooled with 56K detector temperature.

== See also ==
- List of European Space Agency programmes and missions

== Links ==
- Infra-Red Sounder (IRS) Meteosat Third Generation – Next generation weather satellites, OHB Publication, OHB System AG
- Why MTG-S1 is a nowcasting game-changer
