= Sentinel-5 Precursor =

European Earth observation satellite

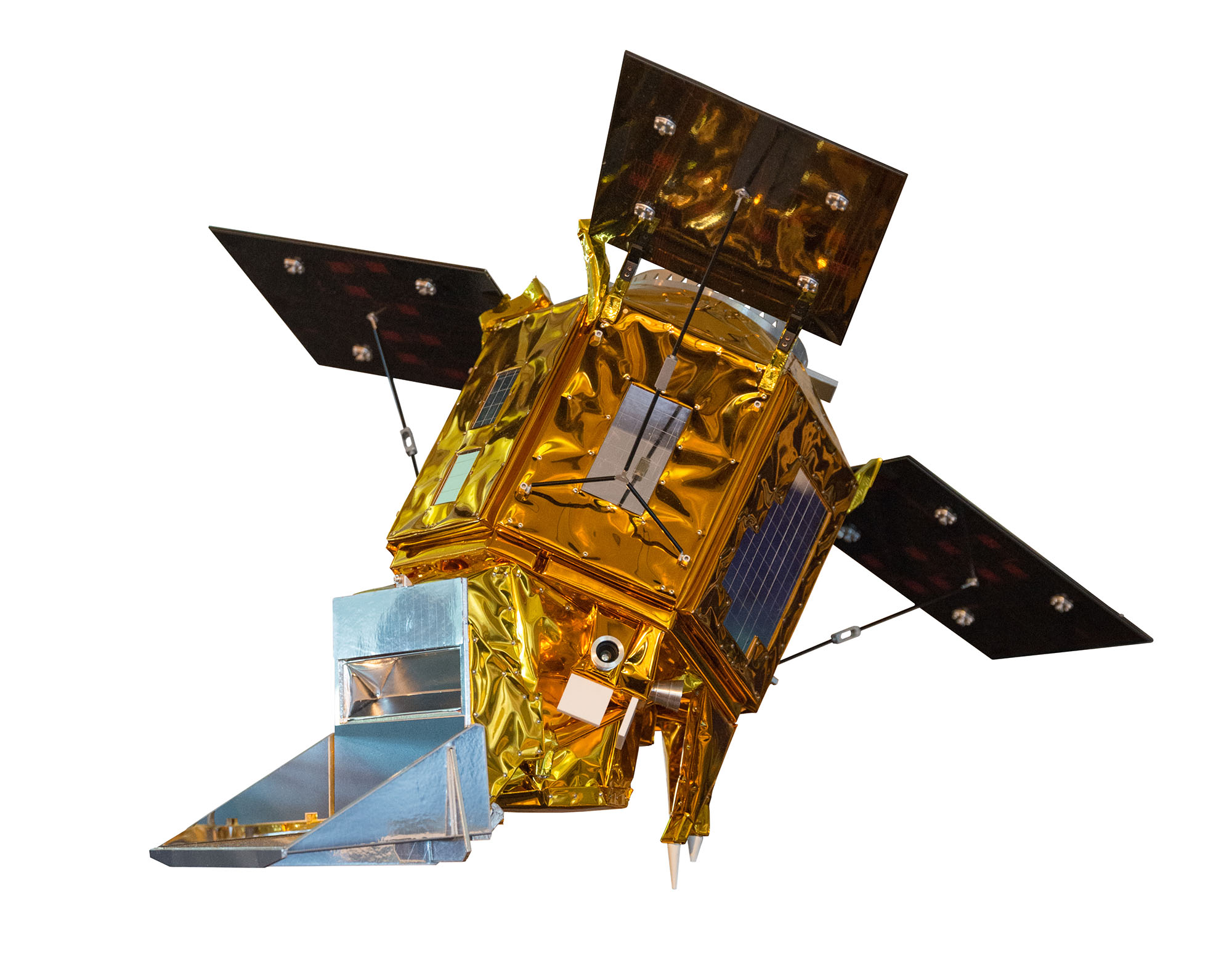
- Sentinel-5P model
- Manufacturer: Astrium UK
- Country of origin: European Union
- Operator: ESA
- Applications: Atmospheric composition, air pollution, ozone layer monitoring

Specifications
- Spacecraft type: Satellite
- Bus: Astrobus-L 250 M
- Launch mass: 900 kilograms (2,000 lb)
- Dry mass: 820 kilograms (1,810 lb)
- Dimensions: 3.35 m × 5.63 m (11.0 ft × 18.5 ft) – height × diameter
- Power: 1500 watts
- Batteries: 156 Ah
- Equipment: TROPOMI
- Design life: 7 years

Production
- Status: Operational
- On order: 0
- Built: 1
- Launched: 1
- Operational: 1
- Maiden launch: 13 October 2017

Sentinel-5 Precursor (Sentinel-5P) is an Earth observation satellite developed by ESA as part of the Copernicus Programme to close the gap in continuity of observations between Envisat and Sentinel-5. It was launched in October 2017, and has a design life of 7 years. The TROPOspheric Monitoring Instrument (Tropomi) provides the most detailed methane emissions monitoring available.

== Overview ==
Sentinel-5P is the first mission of the Copernicus Programme dedicated to monitoring air pollution. Its instrument, Tropomi, is an ultraviolet, visible, near and short-wavelength infrared spectrometer. The satellite is built on a hexagonal Astrobus L 250 satellite bus equipped with S- and X-band communication antennas, three foldable solar panels generating 1500 watts and hydrazine thrusters for station-keeping.

The satellite operates in an 824 km (512 mi) Sun-synchronous orbit with a Local Time of Ascending Node of 13:30 hours.

=== Pre-launch ===
The first large contract for Sentinel-5P was signed in July 2009 for Tropomi instrument between the European Space Agency and Dutch Ministry of Economic Affairs which contributed €78 million. On 8 December 2011, ESA selected Astrium UK as a prime contractor for the satellite, signing contract worth €45.5 million. Construction of the satellite itself was completed in May 2014, followed by successful integration with its primary instrument. From design to launch Tropomi cost €220 million.

=== Launch ===
The satellite was launched by Eurockot Launch Services onboard Rokot. The launch was originally planned for late 2014, but after multiple postponements, was launched on 13 October 2017 at 09:27 UTC from Plesetsk Cosmodrome Site 133. Sentinel-5P successfully reached its final orbit 79 minutes after lift-off.

== TROPOMI instrument ==
Sentinel-5P carries a single instrument, the TROPOspheric Monitoring Instrument (TROPOMI). TROPOMI is a spectrometer that measures solar radiation in the ultraviolet (UV), visible (VIS), near-infrared (NIR) and short-wave infrared (SWIR) to monitor ozone, methane, formaldehyde, aerosol, carbon monoxide, NO_{2} and SO_{2} in the atmosphere. It extends the capabilities of the OMI from the Aura satellite and the SCIAMACHY instrument from Envisat.

TROPOMI is taking measurements every second covering an area approximately 2,600 km (1,600 mi) wide and 7 km (4.3 mi) at a resolution of 7 x 5.5 km. The total mass of TROPOMI is approximately 200 kg (440 lb) with a power consumption of 170 watts on average and a data output of 140 gigabits per orbit.

=== Instrument design and construction ===
TROPOMI was built by a joint venture between the Netherlands Space Office, Royal Netherlands Meteorological Institute, Netherlands Institute for Space Research, Netherlands Organisation for Applied Scientific Research and Airbus Defence and Space Netherlands.

The instrument is split into four major blocks: the UV, VIS and NIR spectrometers and a calibration block, the SWIR spectrometer with its optics, the instrument control unit, and a cooling block. Light is separated into different wavelengths using grating spectrometers and then measured with four different detectors corresponding to the respective spectral bands. The UV spectrometer has a spectral range of 270–320 nm, the visible light spectrometer has a range of 310–500 nm, the NIR spectrometer has a range of 675–775 nm, and the SWIR spectrometer has a range of 2305–2385 nm.

==== SWIR spectrometer ====
The SWIR spectrometer was designed and built by the Optical Payloads Group of Surrey Satellites (SSTL); it employs an immersed grating design in which light impinges upon an etched grating from within a high-index silicon substrate. The reduced wavelength within the refractive medium permits an efficient, space-saving design. The SWIR grating was provided by SRON (Netherlands), who also provided the Front-End Electronics (FEE). The SWIR spectrometer receives light from the main instrument via an intermediate pupil, and directs it via a telescope towards a slit which defines the along-track footprint of the instrument on the ground. Light from the slit is re-collimated, diffracted by the immersed-grating at high-order, and finally imaged onto a two-dimensional detector by a high aperture relay lens. The SWIR detector (furnished by Sofradir, France) has 256 elements in the across-track direction and 1024 elements in the spectral direction, with an element pitch of 30 microns; it is operated cold (typically 140 K). The SWIR spectrometer optics are mounted on a cooled optical bench (approximately 200K) and the instrument is insulated by a multiple-layer insulation (MLI) blanket. The SWIR instrument was aligned, focussed and characterised at the Mullard Space Science laboratory thermal vacuum facility in Surrey, UK.

== Application examples ==
Sentinel-5P Tropomi showed substantial reductions in nitrogen dioxide amounts over Chinese cities between late January and February 2020. These were linked to China's response to the coronavirus pandemic which greatly reduced industrial and other polluting activities. Tropomi pollution data also helped to confirm a correlation between a higher incidence of COVID-19 and chronic exposure to air pollutants.
