= GMOSAIC =

G-MOSAIC (GMES services for management of operations, situation awareness and intelligence for regional crises) is a GMES security pilot project financed by the European Commission 7th Framework Programme. G-MOSAIC will develop products, methodologies and pilot services for the provision of geo-spatial information in support of the external relations policies of the union in support to the prevention and management of external regional crisis (and the relevant intervention) for, e.g. peace keeping, peace enforcing, crisis prevention, people and citizens rescue.

== Objectives ==
G-MOSAIC service domains are characterised in order to deal with EU security related to out-of-EU crisis areas, focusing on:

- Support intelligence and early warning, with the objective to deploy and validate those information services which contribute to the analysis of the causes leading to regional crises. One important aspect is the development of crisis indicators, based on the assessment – also through satellite derived data - of crisis precursor elements such as: natural resource and land degradation, water scarcity; food security issues, population pressure, impacts of climate change, health epidemics; illegal activities and trafficking, weapons proliferation.
- Support crisis management operations, with the objective of deploying and validating those information services which contribute to support the planning for EU intervention during crises, the EU intervention and citizen repatriation during crises, the crisis consequences management, reconstruction, and resilience.

== Figures ==
- Start date: January 1, 2009
- Project duration: 36 months
- Consortium: 36 partners
- Total cost: 15 MEuro
- EC contribution: 9,6 MEuro

== Services ==
The following table shows the main G-MOSAIC services versus the GMES areas for actions in the security domain

GMES areas for actions	GMES activities and priorities	G-MOSAIC domains
Maritime	Protection of maritime transport/cargoes and protection against piracy and emerging security threats	(outside G-MOSAIC scope)
Migration and border monitoring	Observation of civil and military activities in the proximity of the borders, both land and maritime including maritime migration routes. Surveillance of land border-crossing activities and identification of permanent or temporary settlement of people and infrastructures along border routes	Sea (outside G-MOSAIC scope); Land border; Land/sea transition
EU external actions	Trans-regional security threats as from the Petersberg tasks: Peace-keeping; Peace enforcement; Indicators and warning monitoring; Support to restore rule of law; Crisis management after natural/manmade disaster; Damage assessment and reconstruction; Humanitarian intervention; Evacuation planning; Treaty verification	Nuclear non-proliferation treaty; Natural resources and conflicts; Critical assets; Crisis management operations
