= MTG-S1/Sentinel-4A =

European Meteorology and Earth Observation satellite

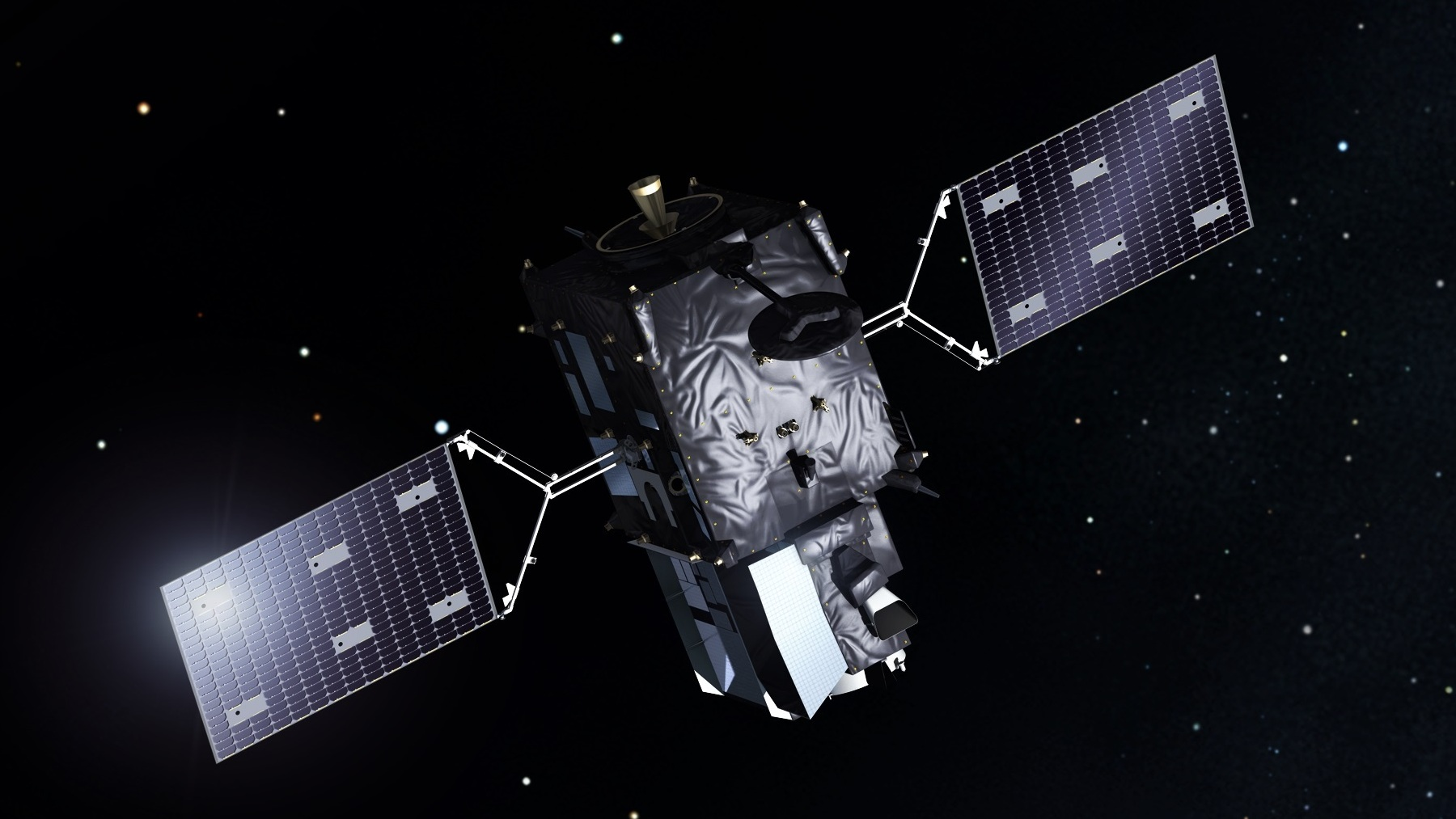
- Artistic Representation of MTG-S1/Sentinel-4A Satellite
- Mission type: Meteorology/Earth observation
- Operator: EUMETSAT, ESA
- COSPAR ID: 2025-143A
- SATCAT no.: 64723
- Website: MTG (EUMETSAT); MTG (ESA); Sentinel-4 (ESA)
- Mission duration: 8.5 years (planned); 1 year, 4 months, 7 days (elapsed)

Spacecraft properties
- Spacecraft type: MTG-S
- Bus: SmallGEO
- Manufacturer: Thales Alenia Space
- Launch mass: 3,800 kg (8,400 lb)

Start of mission
- Launch date: 1 July 2025, 21:04 UTC
- Rocket: Falcon 9 Block 5 (F9-499)
- Launch site: Kennedy LC-39A
- Contractor: SpaceX

Orbital parameters
- Reference system: Geocentric
- Regime: GEO

MTG-S1/Sentinel-4A, officially designated Meteosat-13 upon entering operational service, is a European Meteorology and Earth Observation satellite. It is one of two Meteosat Third Generation-Sounder (MTG-S) spacecraft owned and operated by EUMETSAT and also the first of two satellites in the Sentinel-4 constellation, part of the European Union's Copernicus programme on Earth observation.

== Timeline ==
=== Development ===
- In July 2011, ESA awarded a contract to Astrium (now part of Airbus Defence and Space) to develop and build two Sentinel-4 instruments to be carried on MTG-S satellites. At the time, the launches were expected to happen in 2019 and 2027.
- In February 2023, the Sentinel-4 instrument module, containing the UVN spectrometer, was shipped from Rutherford Appleton Laboratory in the UK to OHB in Germany.
- In August 2023, the three MTG-S instruments (Sentinel 4, RMU and IRS) were installed on the MTG-S1 satellite at OHB's facilities in Germany.

=== Launch campaign ===
- In July 2024, the MTG-S1 satellite successfully passed its environmental test campaign at IABG’s facilities near Munich.
- In February 2025, the MTG-S1 satellite had completed all functional and environmental tests in Bremen and was pronounced ready for transport to the launch site.
- On 23 April 2025, the MTG-S1 satellite left Bremen on board the MN Colibri cargo ship and arrived at Cape Canaveral on 6 May. It was later transported to the AstroTech facilities cleanroom.
- On 26 June 2025, ESA announced that the MTG-S1 satellite would launch no earlier than 1 July 2025, 21:03 UTC with a launch window of 2 hours.
- Falcon 9 B1085 with the MTG-S1 satellite and the Sentinel-4A instrument launched on 1 July 2025 at 21:04 UTC toward geostationary transfer orbit. The satellite separated from the rocket's upper stage approximately 35 minutes after liftoff and begun its 17-day transfer period. After reaching its position in a geostationary Earth orbit, the satellite undergoes a commissioning period of 9 to 12 months.

=== In orbit ===
- On 18 July 2025, the Launch and Early Orbit Phase (LEOP) of MTG-S1 has been successfully concluded and the satellite was handed over to Eumetsat. The LEOP was managed by Telespazio (with support from ESA, OHB, and Thales Alenia Space) from the Fucino Space Centre, Italy.
- In October 2025, ESA published first preliminary images from the Sentinel-4A mission showing concentrations of atmospheric nitrogen dioxide, sulphur dioxide, and ozone, including a distinct plume of sulphur dioxide emerging from Mount Etna and clear nitrogen dioxide pollution hotspots along the Mediterranean coast and over Po Valley.
- On 27 January 2026, at the 18th European Space Conference in Brussels, ESA published the first images from the MTG-S1 mission. Two global images showing temperature and humidity were taken on 15 November 2025 and an animation of the eruption of the Hayli Gubbi volcano in Ethiopia was taken on 23 November 2025.

== Gallery ==
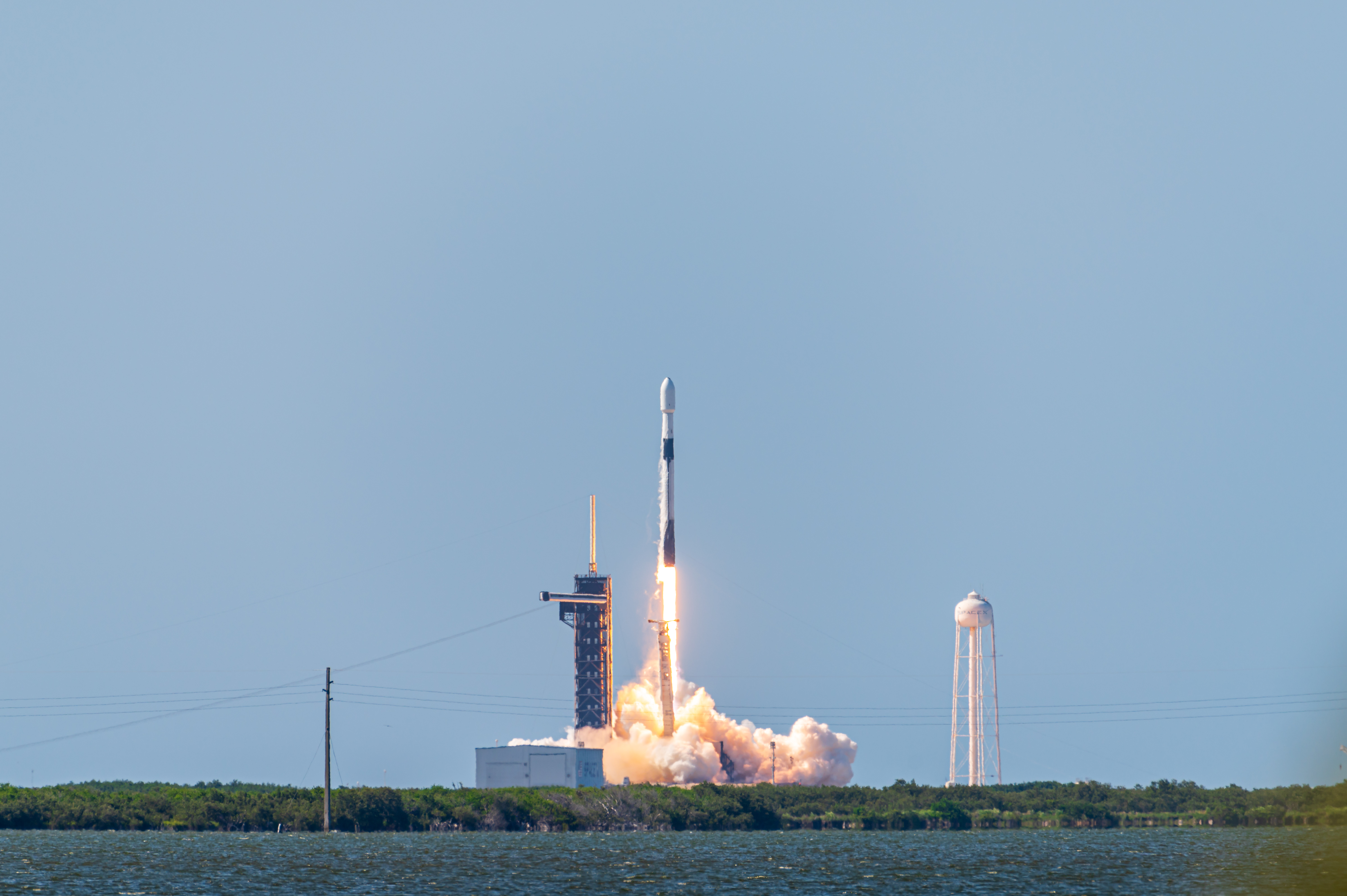
MTG-S1 Launches from Kennedy Space Center

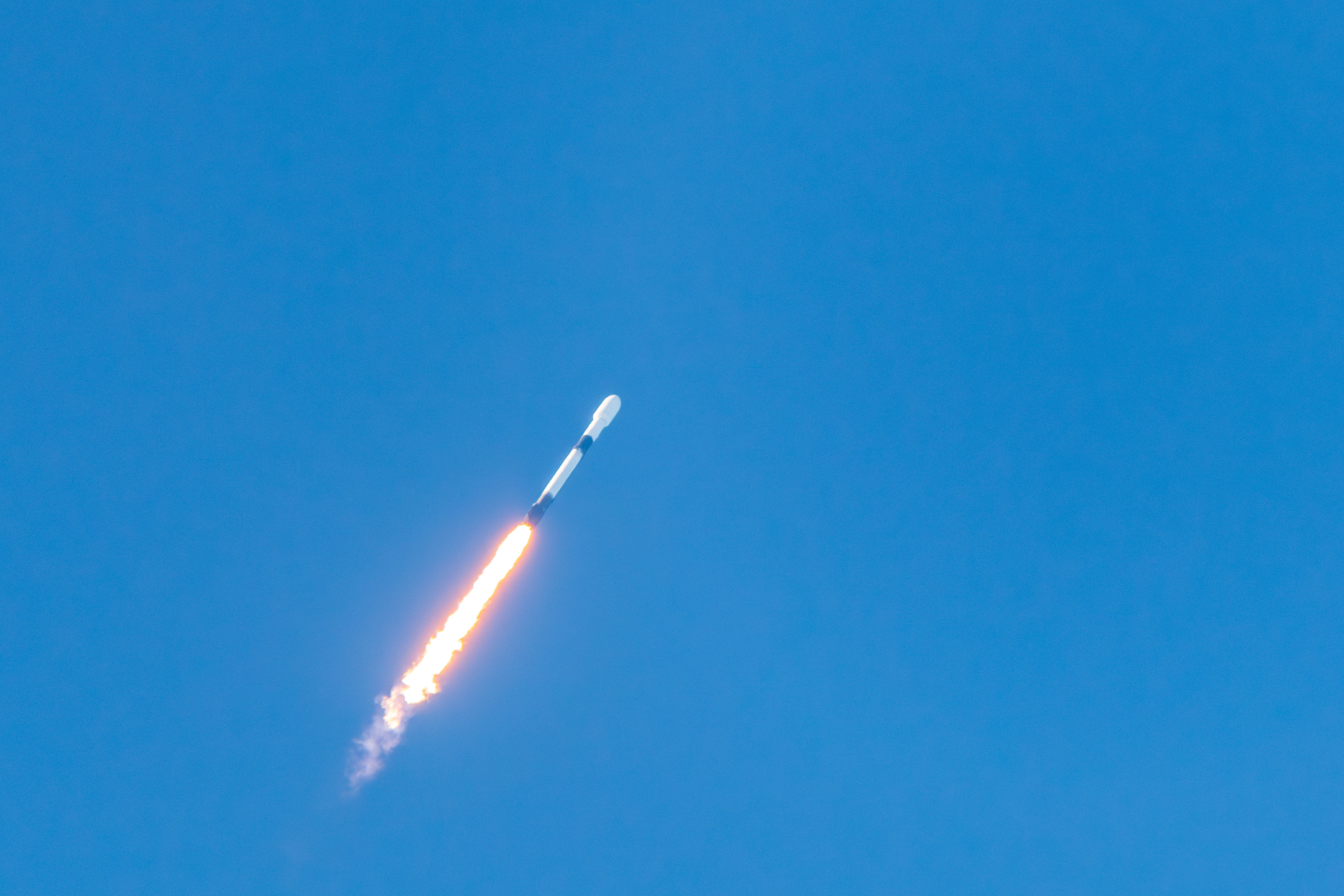
MTG-S1 Launches from KSC (2)

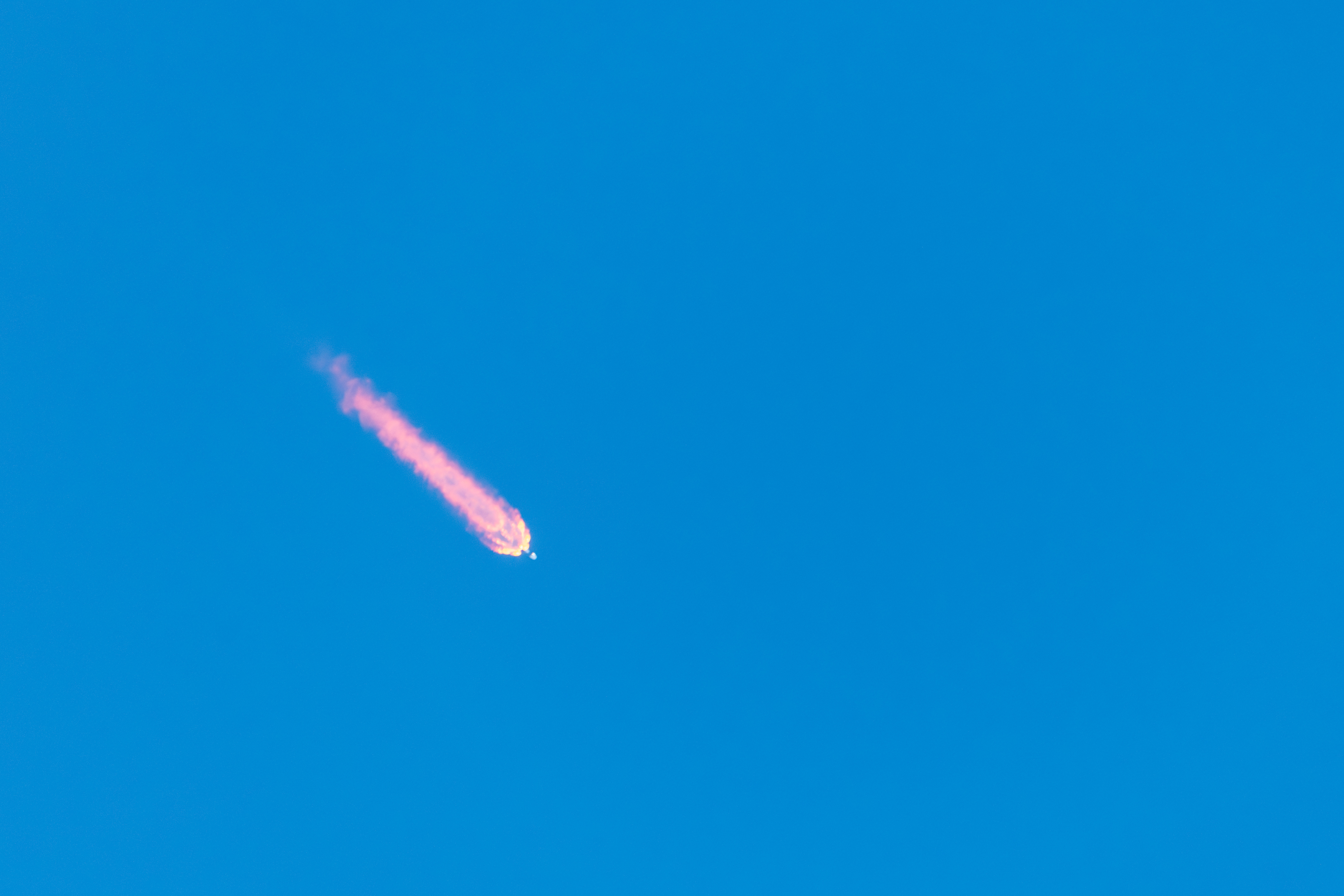
MTG-S1 Launches from KSC (3)

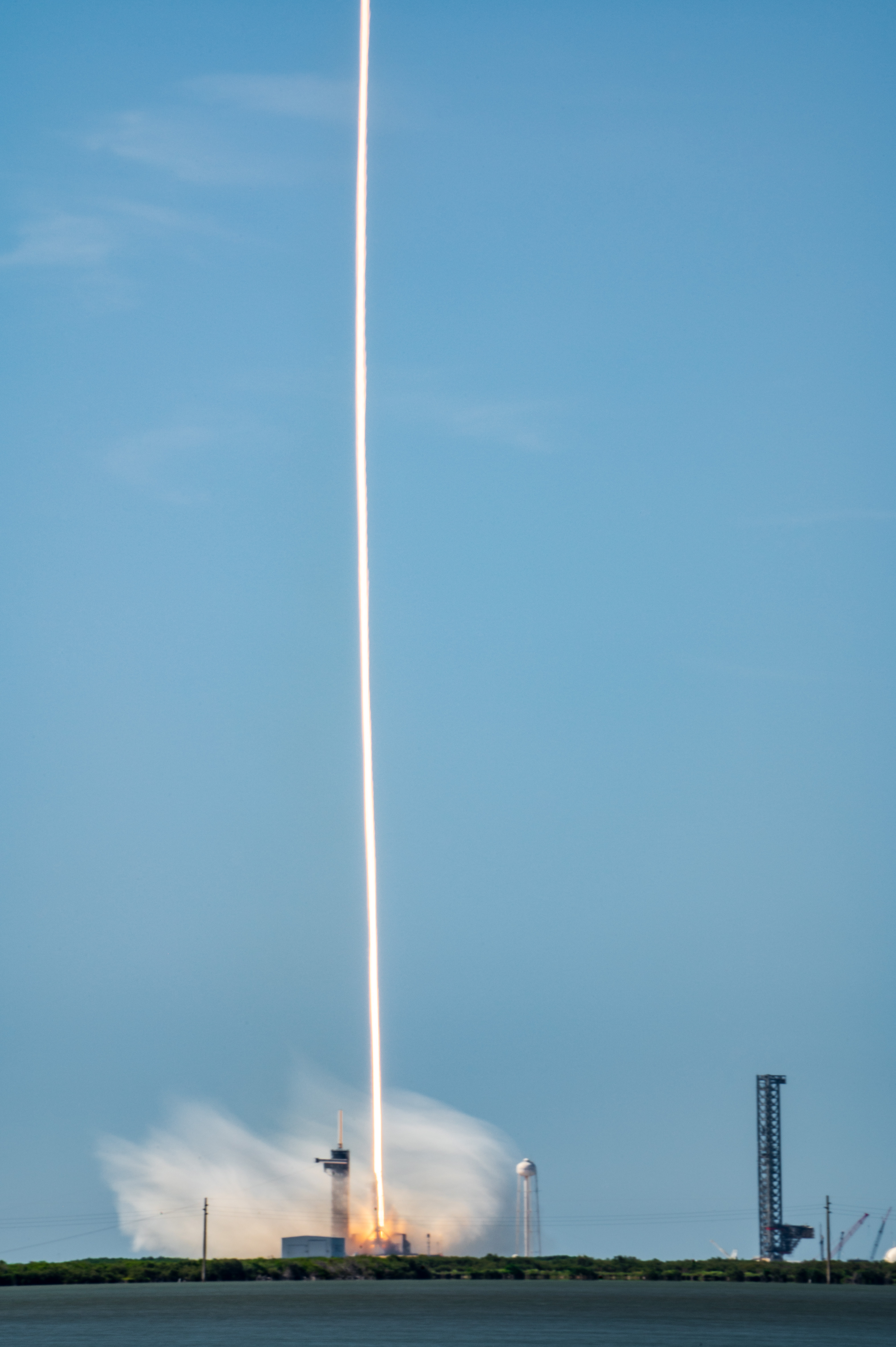
MTG-S1 Launches from KSC (4)

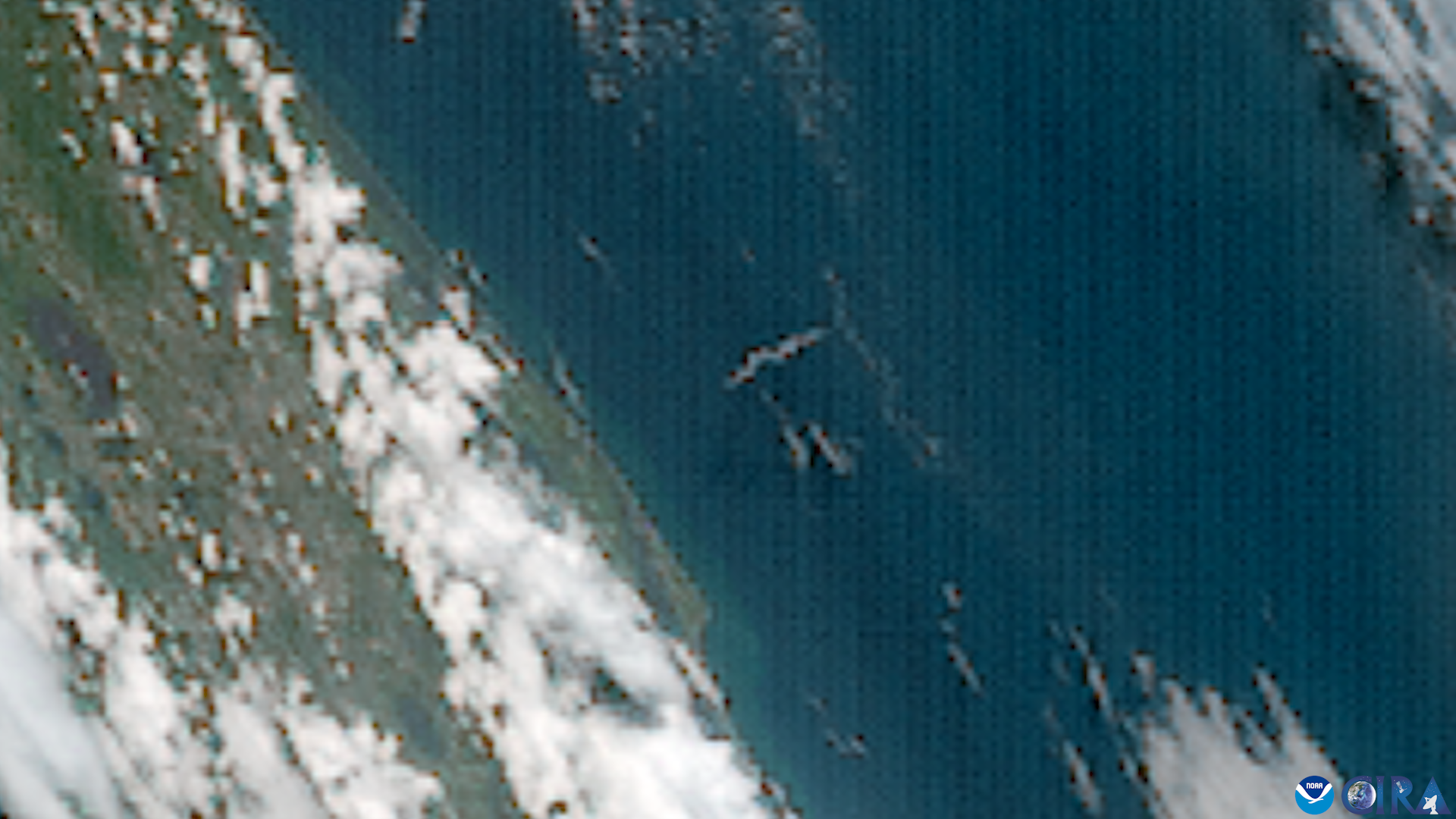
Launch of MTG-S1 seen by GOES-18, GOES-19

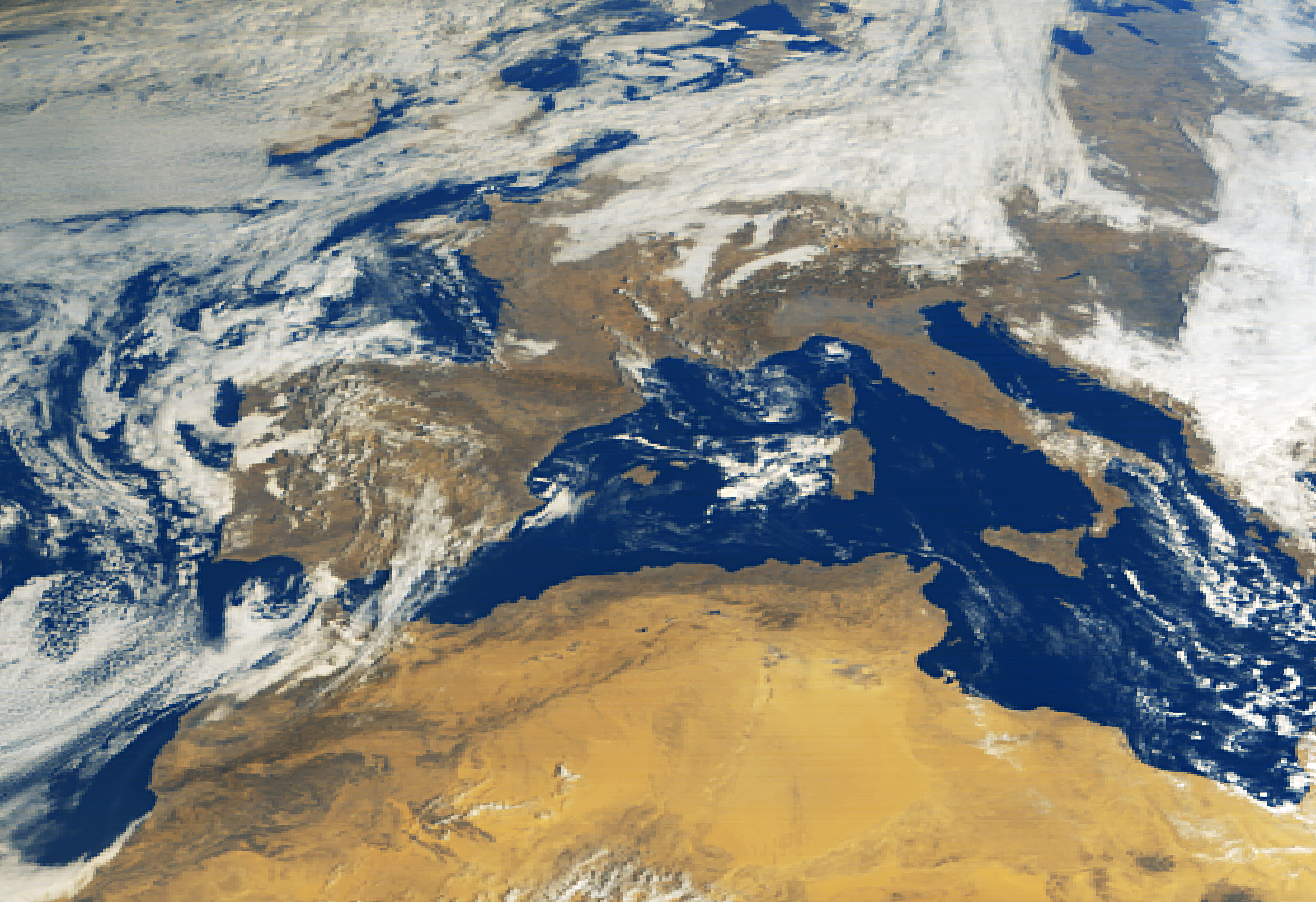
Europe and North Africa from Sentinel-4A

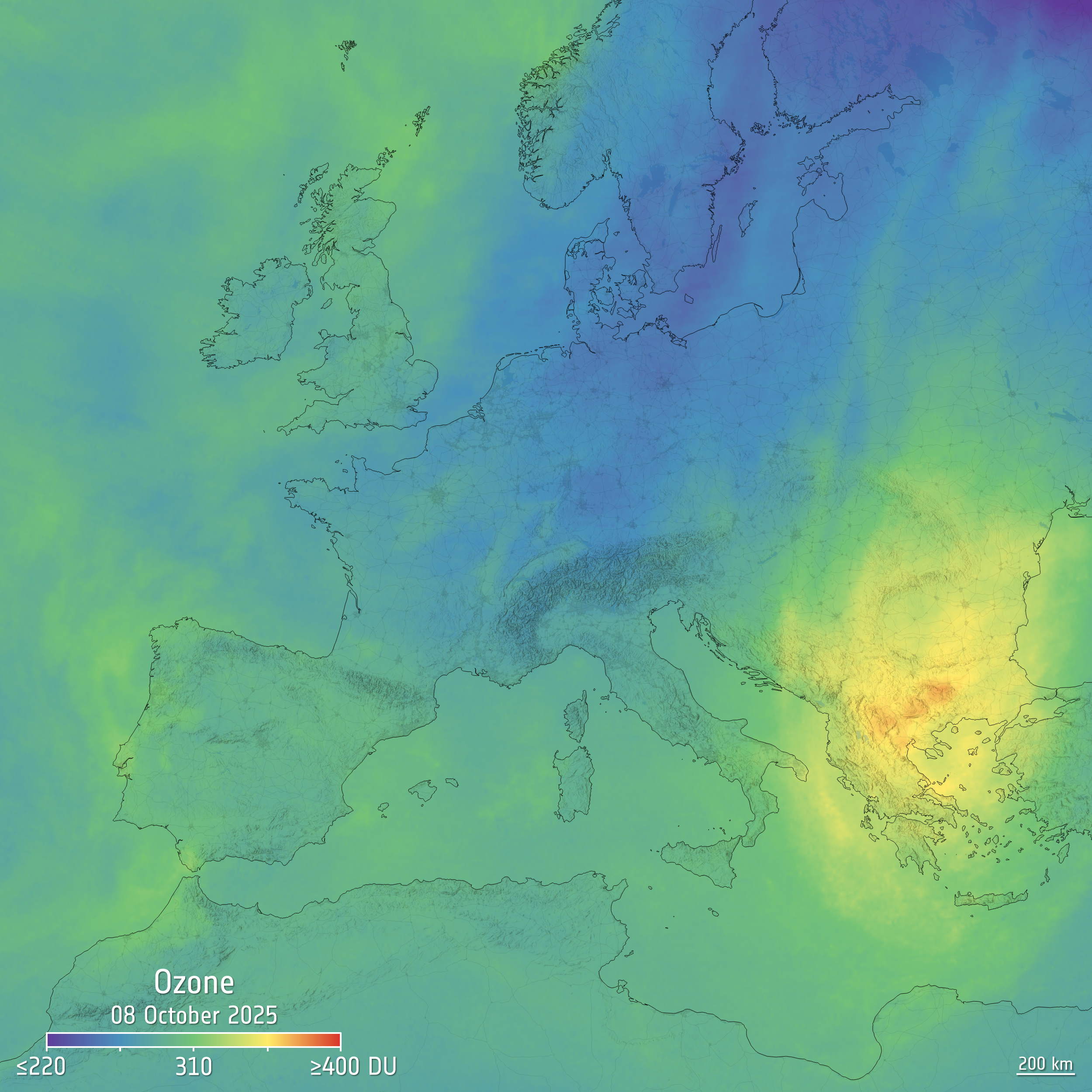
First image of ozone from Sentinel-4A

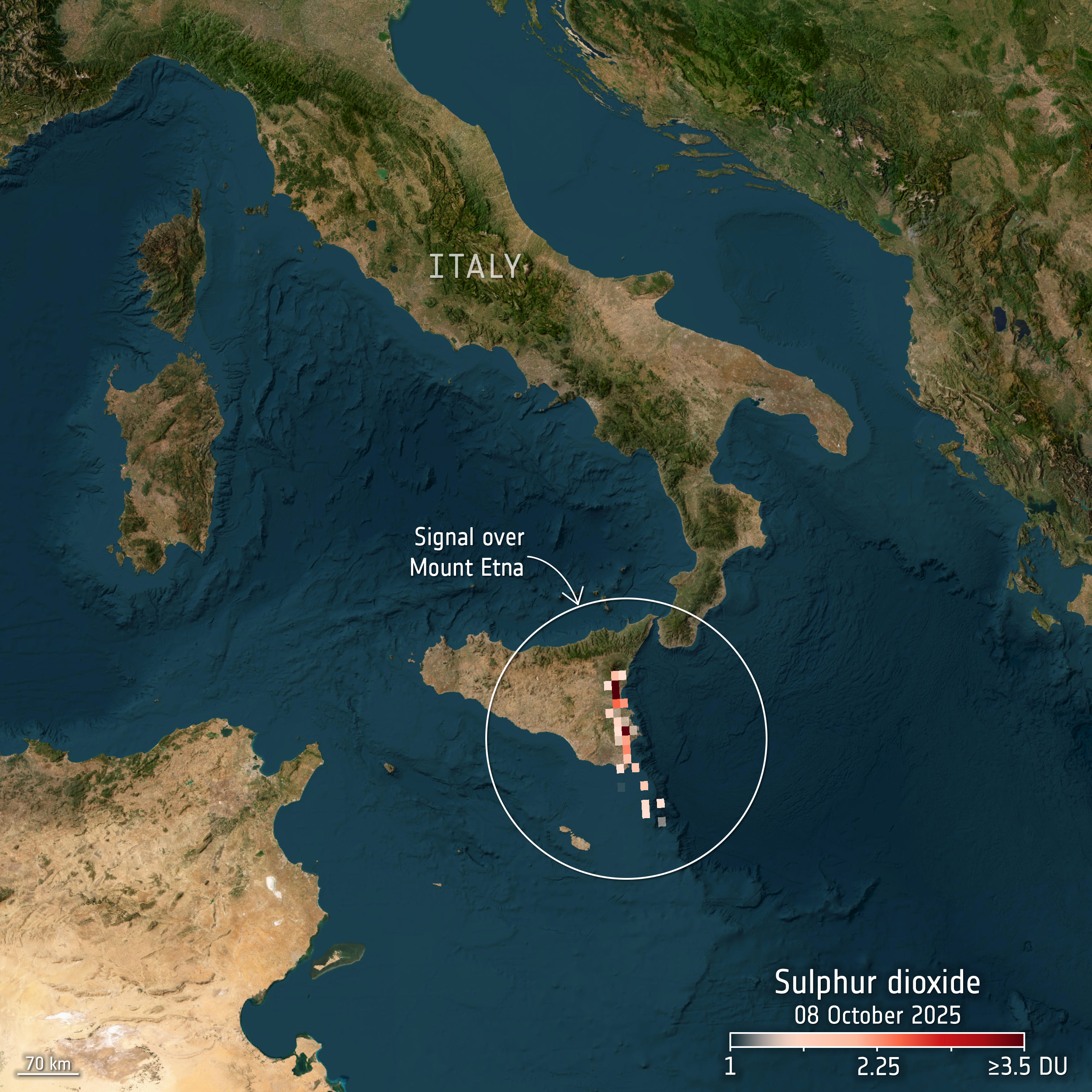
First image of sulphur dioxide from Sentinel-4A

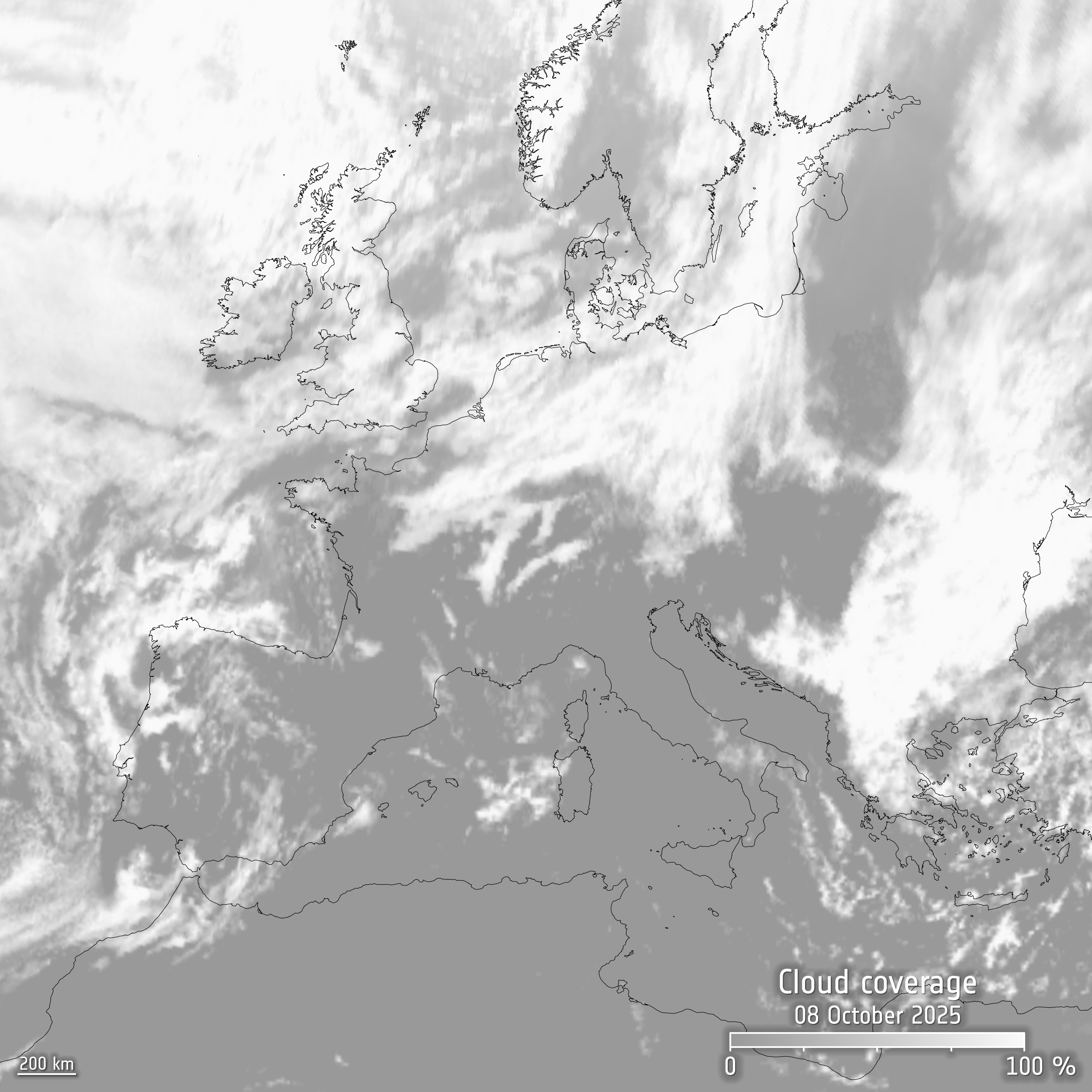
Cloud cover over Europe on 8 October 2025

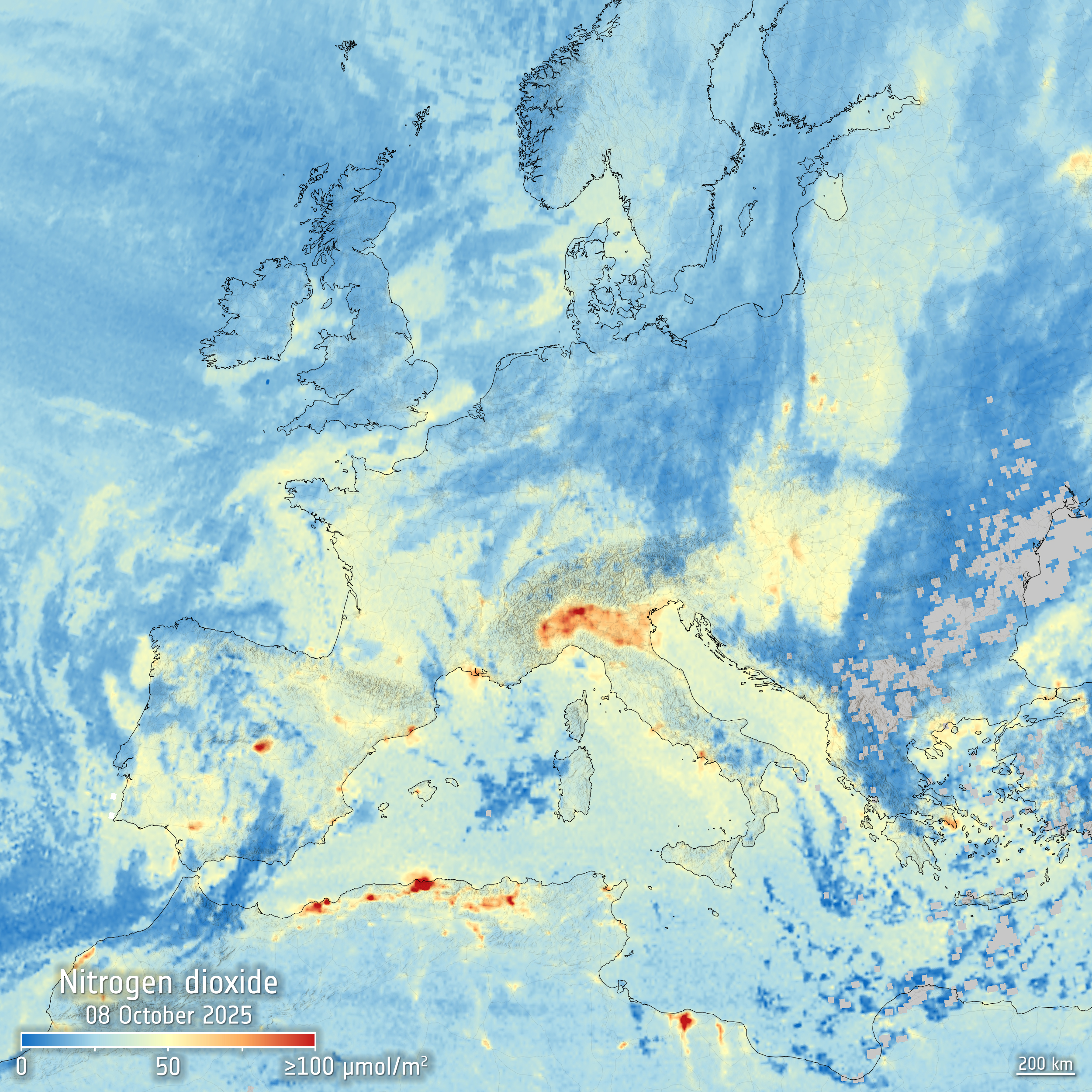
First image of nitrogen dioxide from Sentinel-4A

== See also ==
- 2025 in spaceflight
- List of European Space Agency programmes and missions
