= HiVE =

Earth observation satellite constellation

- Manufacturer: (Germany) constellr
- Country of origin: Germany; European Union; European Space Agency
- Applications: Earth observation
- Website: https://www.constellr.com

Specifications
- Regime: Sun-synchronous orbit

Production
- Planned: 3
- Launched: 2
- Operational: 2
- Maiden launch: 14 January 2025

Related spacecraft
- Launch vehicle: Falcon 9

The High-precision Versatile Ecosphere (HiVE) is a satellite constellation of Earth observation satellites under development by the German company constellr. The constellation is designed to deliver high resolution land surface temperature data on a global scale using infrared imaging for agriculture, urban planning, and infrastructure management. HiVE is supported and partially funded by the European Space Agency's InCubed programme and contributes to the EU's Copernicus programme for Earth observation. First two satellites of the constellation were launched on two separate flights of Falcon 9 in 2025.

== Satellites ==
Name	COSPAR ID	Launch date	Launch vehicle	Flight	Ref
SkyBee-1	2025-009BQ	14 January 2025	Falcon 9	Transporter-12	
SkyBee-2	2025-135S	23 June 2025	Falcon 9	Transporter-14	
SkyBee-3		late 2026 (planned)			

== See also ==
- List of European Space Agency programmes and missions
