= CO2M-B (Sentinel-7B) =

European Earth observation satellite for monitoring greenhouse gases

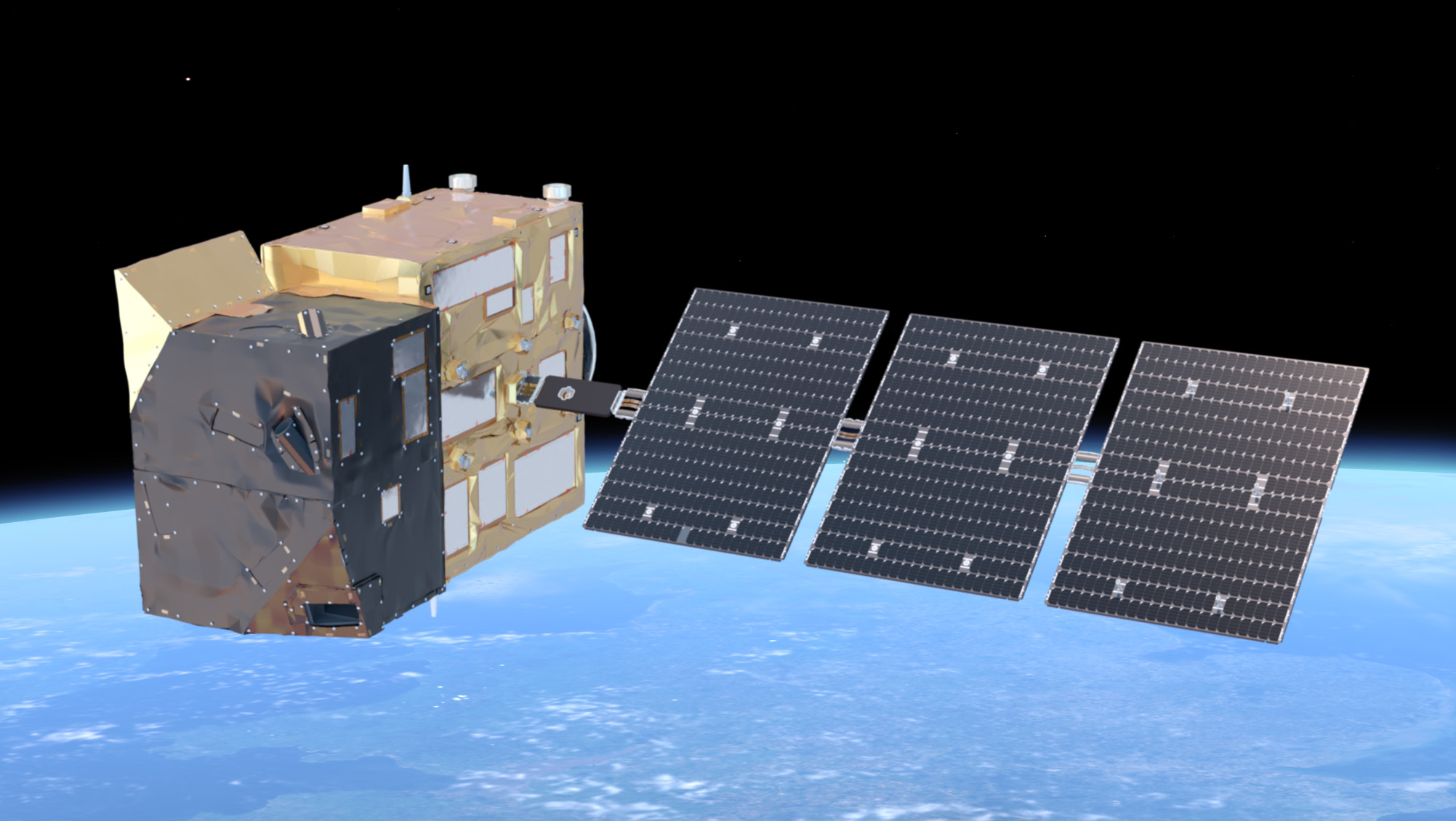
- Names: CO2M-B, Sentinel-7B
- Mission type: Earth observation satellite
- Operator: ESA, EUMETSAT

Start of mission
- Launch date: 2028 (planned)
- Rocket: Vega C
- Launch site: Guiana Space Centre

CO2M-B, also known as Sentinel-7B, is a future European Earth observation satellite within the EU's Copernicus programme, expected to launch in 2028. Its goal is to provide global measurements of anthropogenic emissions of CO_{2}, CH_{4}, and NO_{2} to support fulfilling the Paris Agreement. Like its sister spacecraft CO2M-A (Sentinel-7A), it will be equipped with an infrared spectrometer, a multi-angle polarimeter, and a cloud imager.

== See also ==
- List of European Space Agency programmes and missions
