= SCIAMACHY =

SCIAMACHY, Nadir and Limb scanning.

SCIAMACHY (SCanning Imaging Absorption SpectroMeter for Atmospheric CHartographY; Greek: σκιαμαχεί: analogously: "Fighting shadows") was one of ten instruments aboard of ESA's ENVIronmental SATellite, ENVISAT. It was a satellite spectrometer designed to measure sunlight, transmitted, reflected and scattered by the Earth's atmosphere or surface in the ultraviolet, visible and near infrared wavelength region (240 nm - 2380 nm) at moderate spectral resolution (0.2 nm - 1.5 nm). SCIAMACHY was built by Netherlands and Germany at TNO/TPD, SRON and Dutch Space.

== Launch and termination ==
SCIAMACHY, aboard the ENVISAT satellite, was launched by ESA (European Space Agency) from Kourou, French Guiana, in March 2002. ENVISAT's mission was ended in May 2012, after loss of contact one month earlier.

== Operation ==
The absorption, reflection and scattering characteristics of the atmosphere were determined by measuring the extraterrestrial solar irradiance and the upwelling radiance observed in different viewing geometries. The ratio of extraterrestrial irradiance and the upwelling radiance can be inverted to provide information about the amounts and distribution of important atmospheric constituents, which absorb or scatter light, and the spectral reflectance (or albedo) of the Earth's surface.

== Purpose ==
SCIAMACHY was conceived to improve global knowledge and understanding of a variety of issues of importance for the chemistry and physics of the Earth's atmosphere (troposphere, stratosphere and mesosphere) and potential changes resulting from either anthropogenic behavior or natural phenomena.
