= CO2M-A (Sentinel-7A) =

European Earth observation satellite for monitoring greenhouse gases

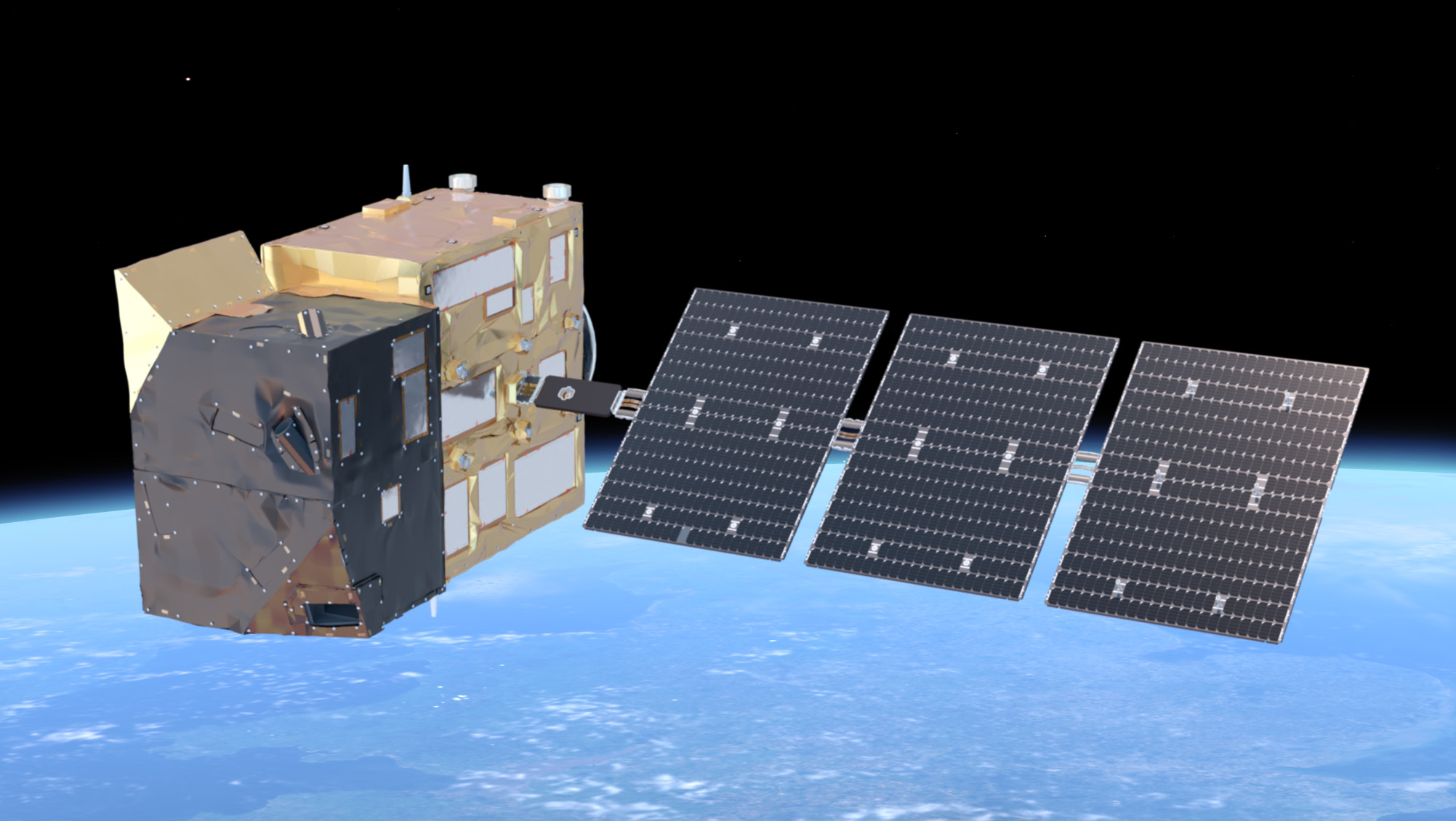
- Names: CO2M-A, Sentinel-7A
- Mission type: Earth observation satellite
- Operator: ESA, EUMETSAT

Start of mission
- Launch date: November 2027 (planned)
- Rocket: Vega C
- Launch site: Guiana Space Centre

CO2M-A, also known as Sentinel-7A, is a future European Earth observation satellite within the EU's Copernicus programme. Expected to launch in November 2027, CO2M-A will be the first satellite of the Copernicus Sentinel Expansion Missions. Its goal is to provide global measurements of anthropogenic emissions of CO_{2}, CH_{4}, and NO_{2} to support fulfilling the Paris Agreement. The satellite will be equipped with an infrared spectrometer, a multi-angle polarimeter, and a cloud imager.

== See also ==
- List of European Space Agency programmes and missions
