= Vega flight VV17 =

Failed space launch

Vega launch
- Launch: 17 November 2020, 01:52:20 UTC (16 November 2020, 10:52:20 pm local time)
- Operator: Arianespace
- Pad: Kourou, ELV
- Payload: SEOSat-Ingenio; TARANIS
- Outcome: Failure

Vega launches

Vega flight VV17 was the 17th launch of the Vega rocket. The rocket failed after launch and the mission was lost. It was the second failure of the Vega rocket, after that of VV15 in 2019.

== Payload ==
The dual payload consisted of the SEOSat-Ingenio and TARANIS satellites. With their adapters and dispensers, the total mass was approximately 1,192 kilograms (2,628 lb).

=== SEOSat-Ingenio ===
SEOSat-Ingenio, with a launch mass of about 750 kg (1,650 lb) and a design lifetime of 7 years, was in the upper position. It was planned to be injected 54 minutes after launch into its target sun-synchronous orbit at an altitude of about 670 km (semi-major axis of about 7050 km) and mean local time of the descending node approximately equal to 10:30. SEOSat-Ingenio would have been ESA's 79th and Airbus's 128th satellite launched by Arianespace.

=== TARANIS ===
TARANIS, with a launch mass of about 175 kg (386 lb) and a design lifetime of 2 to 4 years, was in the lower position. It was planned to be injected 1 hour and 42 minutes after launch into its target sun-synchronous orbit at an altitude of approximately 676 km and mean local time of the descending node also approximately equal to 10:30. TARANIS would have been CNES's 18th satellite (its 7th built in-house) launched by Arianespace.

== Flight ==
The flight was launched from the ELV launch pad at the Guiana Space Centre in Kourou, French Guiana on 17 November 2020 at 01:52:20 UTC (16 November 2020 at 22:52:20 local time).

=== Launch failure ===
The flight was planned to deploy the satellites into 2 very slightly different sun-synchronous orbits at roughly 675 km (starting 54 minutes until 102 minutes after liftoff), before the upper stage would have re-ignited to re-enter the Earth's atmosphere. However, at twenty minutes and thirty seconds into the flight, the range operations manager reported that the rocket's trajectory was degrading. The rocket failed after launch and the mission was lost. The launcher fell in a completely uninhabited area close to the drop zone planned for the Zefiro 9 stage. The cause was human error making the mission a failure. This was the Vega rocket's second failure in its last three missions.

== Inquiry commission ==
Initial investigations, conducted with the available data, concluded a problem related to the integration of the fourth-stage AVUM (Attitude and Vernier Upper Module) thrust vector control system is the most likely cause of the loss of control of the launcher. In accordance with their standard protocols, Arianespace and the European Space Agency (ESA) will set up an independent Inquiry Commission jointly chaired by Daniel Neuenschwander, Director of Space Transport at ESA, and Stéphane Israël, Arianespace Chief Executive Officer (CEO), on 18 November 2020. The Commission will provide detailed evidence to explain why steps were not taken to identify and correct the integration error. The Commission will formulate a road map for the Vega's return to flight under conditions of complete reliability. Arianespace and ESA will jointly present the findings of this commission.

During assembly, it is believed by Commission members that two cables carrying control signals to the thrust vectoring actuators on the AVUM's RD-843 engine were crossed. With the guidance signals going to the wrong actuators, the vehicle was uncontrollable and began to tumble. As a result, the satellites did not achieve orbital velocity. The rocket reentered the Earth's atmosphere and disintegrated during reentry.

On 17 December 2020, the Independent Enquiry Commission announced its conclusions. The Commission confirmed the preliminary findings that the two control signal cables on the AVUM's RD-843 engine were incorrectly routed. The IEC further concluded that the improper routing was the result of misleading instructions in the integration procedure that were not detected by personnel "due to some inconsistencies between specific requirements and prescribed controls."

== Aftermath ==
Arianespace expected to resume Vega flights by the end of March 2021. The Vega rocket returned to flight on 28 April 2021, launching the Pleiades Neo 3 imaging satellite for Airbus Defence and Space.

== See also ==
- List of Vega launches
