= Vega (rocket) =

European Space Agency launch system

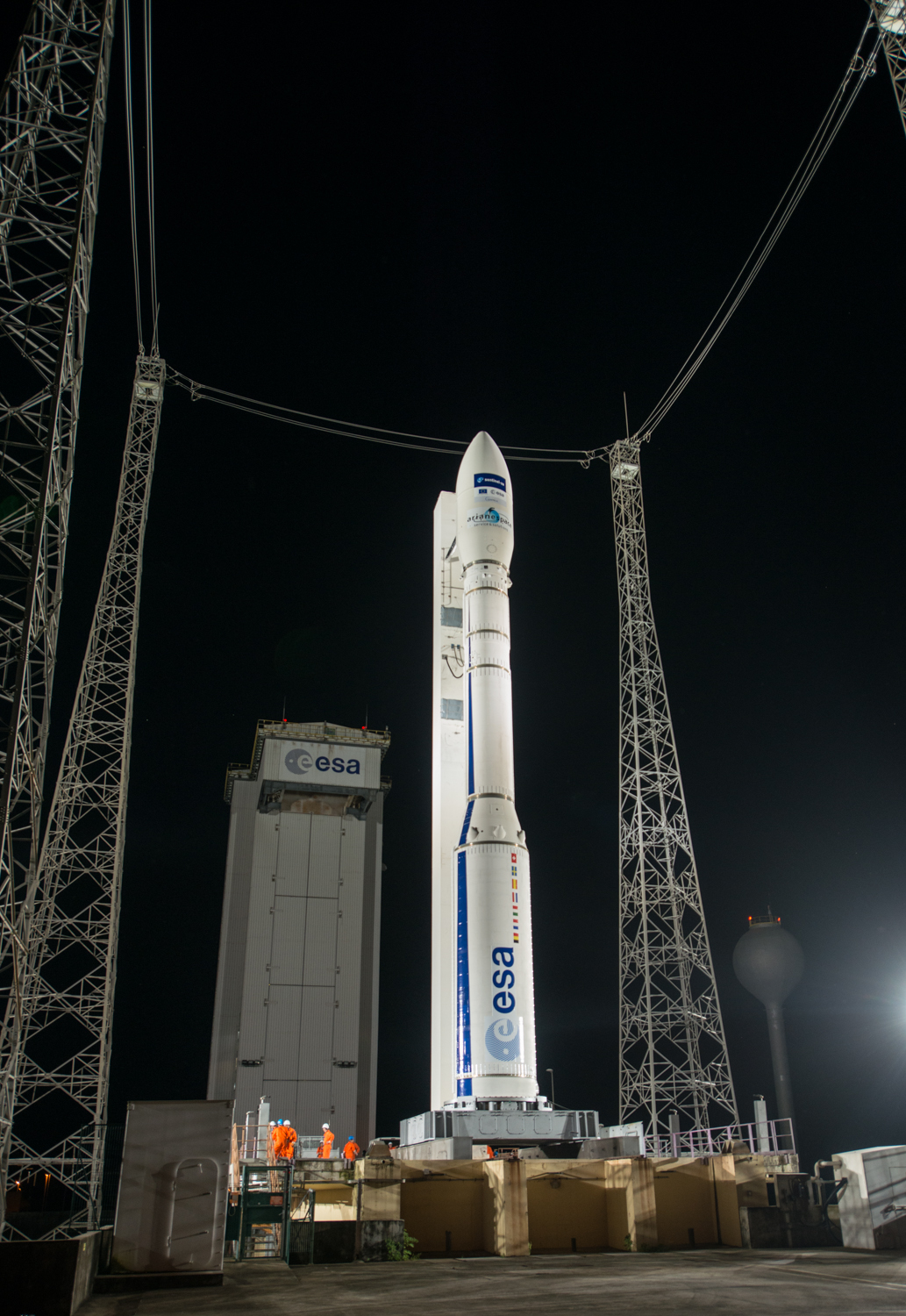
- Vega's VV05 before liftoff with Sentinel-2A
- Function: Small-lift launch vehicle
- Manufacturer: Avio
- Country of origin: European multi-national (Note: The lead manufacturer was from Italy, but the rocket has significant contributions from companies based in Belgium, France, Netherlands, Spain, Switzerland and Ukraine.)
- Cost per launch: US$37 million

Size
- Height: 30 m (98 ft 5 in)
- Diameter: 3 m (9 ft 10 in)
- Mass: 137,000 kg (302,000 lb)
- Stages: 4

Capacity

Payload to polar orbit
- Altitude: 700 km (430 mi)
- Orbital inclination: 90°
- Mass: 1,430 kg (3,150 lb)

Payload to elliptic orbit
- Altitude: 1,500 km × 200 km (930 mi × 120 mi)
- Orbital inclination: 5.4°
- Mass: 1,963 kg (4,328 lb)

Payload to SSO
- Altitude: 400 km (250 mi)
- Mass: 1,450 kg (3,200 lb)

Associated rockets
- Derivative work: Vega C
- Comparable: Delta II; Electron; Epsilon; Minotaur; PSLV; Rokot; Shavit 2; Soyuz-2.1v

Launch history
- Status: Retired
- Launch sites: Guiana, ELV
- Total launches: 22
- Success(es): 20
- Failure: 2
- First flight: 13 February 2012 (multiple payloads)
- Last flight: 5 September 2024 (Sentinel-2C)

First stage – P80FW
- Height: 11.7 m (38 ft 5 in)
- Diameter: 3 m (9 ft 10 in)
- Empty mass: 7,330 kg (16,160 lb)
- Gross mass: 95,695 kg (210,971 lb)
- Maximum thrust: 2,261 kN (508,000 lb_{f})
- Specific impulse: 280 s (2.7 km/s)
- Burn time: 107 seconds
- Propellant: HTPB / AP

Second stage – Zefiro 23
- Height: 8.39 m (27 ft 6 in)
- Diameter: 1.9 m (6 ft 3 in)
- Empty mass: 2,850 kg (6,280 lb)
- Gross mass: 28,850 kg (63,600 lb)
- Maximum thrust: 871 kN (196,000 lb_{f})
- Specific impulse: 287.5 s (2.819 km/s)
- Burn time: 71.6 seconds
- Propellant: HTPB / AP

Third stage – Zefiro 9
- Height: 4.12 m (13 ft 6 in)
- Diameter: 1.9 m (6 ft 3 in)
- Empty mass: 1,315 kg (2,899 lb)
- Gross mass: 11,815 kg (26,048 lb)
- Maximum thrust: 260 kN (58,000 lb_{f})
- Specific impulse: 296 s (2.90 km/s)
- Burn time: 117 seconds
- Propellant: HTPB / AP

Fourth stage – AVUM
- Height: 1.7 m (5 ft 7 in)
- Diameter: 1.9 m (6 ft 3 in)
- Empty mass: 147 kg (324 lb)
- Gross mass: 697 kg (1,537 lb)
- Powered by: 1 × RD-843 (MEA)
- Maximum thrust: 2.45 kN (550 lb_{f})
- Specific impulse: 314.6 s (3.085 km/s)
- Burn time: Up to 612.5 seconds (up to five burns)
- Propellant: UDMH / N_{2}O_{4}

Vega (Italian: Vettore Europeo di Generazione Avanzata, French: Vecteur européen de génération avancée, lit. 'Vector European Generation Advanced') was a European expendable small-lift launch vehicle developed by Avio and operated by Arianespace for the European Space Agency (ESA) and the Italian Space Agency (ASI). Designed to carry payloads between 300 and 2,500 kilograms (660 and 5,510 lb) into low Earth and polar orbits, Vega served primarily scientific and Earth observation missions.

Development of Vega began in 1998, with its maiden flight launched from the Guiana Space Centre on 13 February 2012. Over the next decade, it became the eighth most launched small-lift launch vehicle history, though it struggled to compete in the commercial launch market. After initial success, two in-flight failures and rising competition from SpaceX's rideshare programs, which offered lower prices, relegated Vega to primarily serving European government agencies willing to pay more to support independent space access.

The rocket took its name from Vega, the brightest star in the constellation Lyra. It featured a single-body design without strap-on boosters, consisting of three solid rocket stages, the P80FW, Zefiro 23, and Zefiro 9, topped by a liquid-fueled AVUM upper stage.

Italy led the Vega program, contributing 65% of its funding, with support from France, Spain, Belgium, the Netherlands, Switzerland, Sweden, and others. Vega was succeeded by the more powerful Vega C, which entered service in 2022. The original Vega made its final flight on 5 September 2024.

== Development ==
=== Background ===
During the mid-1990s, French firms Aérospatiale and SEP, along with Italian firm Bombrini-Parodi-Delfino (BPD), commenced discussions on the development of a proposed Ariane Complementary Launcher (ACL). Around the same time, Italy began to champion the concept of a new solid-propellant satellite launcher. This proposed launcher, dubbed Vega, was promoted as functioning to expand the range of European launch capabilities; Vega would be capable of launching a 1,000-kilogram (2,200 lb) payload into a 700-kilometre (430 mi) polar orbit. From the onset, the first of three stages would be based on the solid booster of the existing Ariane 5 expendable launch system while the second and third stages would make use of the in-development Zefiro rocket motor.

However, it was recognised to be a costly project and thus difficult for Italy alone to finance; accordingly, international partners were sought early on in order to proceed with development. In April 1998, it was publicly stated that the Vega programme was dependent upon the securing of roughly ECU70 million of industrial investment, as well as the availability of around ECU350 million of funding that had been requested from interested member states of the European Space Agency (ESA), led by France and Italy. During June 1998, it was announced that ministers from European Space Agency (ESA) member states had agreed to proceed with the first phase of the development programme for Vega; the participating members were France, Belgium, the Netherlands, Spain and Italy – the latter had assumed 55% of the burden for financing the programme.

By September 1998, it was projected that, if fully funded, Vega would perform its first launch during 2002. However, by early 1998, France was publicly showing displeasure in the programme, leading to disputes in its funding. A new, higher-performance version of the Vega was proposed, but this failed to sufficiently satisfy France. In September 1999, France decided to withdraw from the Vega programme entirely, leading to fears for the future of the launcher. In November 1999, European Space Agency (ESA) formally dropped Vega as an endorsed programme, a decision which was largely attributed to France's withdrawal; Italy declared that it would proceed regardless, and threatened to re-direct its allocated contributions for the further development of the Ariane 5 to meet the shortfall.

Around 2000, an alternative use for the Vega was explored as a medium-class booster rocket to be used in conjunction with an improved, up-rated model of the Ariane 5 heavy launcher. In October 2000, it was announced that France and Italy had settled their year-long dispute over the Vega programme; France and Italy agreed to provide 35% and 52%, respectively, of the financing towards the all-composite P80 booster for the Ariane 5 — work which would be included in the Vega programme. In March 2001, FiatAvio and the Italian Space Agency (ASI) formed a new company, European Launch Vehicle (ELV), to assume responsibility for the majority of development work on the Vega programme. By 2003, there was concerns that European Space Agency (ESA)'s recent adoption of the Russian Soyuz launcher would directly compete with the in-development Vega; demands for such launchers had declined with a downturn in the mobile telecommunications satellite market and doubts over the European Galileo satellite navigation system.

=== Programme launch ===
In March 2003, contracts for development of the Vega launcher were signed by European Space Agency (ESA) and Centre national d'études spatiales (CNES), the French space agency; Italy provided 65% of funding while six additional nations contributed the remainder. In May 2004, it was reported that a contract was signed between commercial operator Arianespace and prime contractor ELV to perform vehicle integration at Kourou, French Guiana. In November 2004, construction commenced upon a new dedicated launch pad for the Vega launcher at Kourou, this included a bunker and a self-propelled structure to assist assembly of the stages; this site was built over the original launch pad for the retired Ariane 1 launcher. In September 2005, the successful completion of key tests on the Vega's solid rocket motor igniters, a key milestone, was reported.

In November 2005, European Space Agency (ESA) declared its desire for the development and deployment of an electric propulsion-powered module to work in conjunction with the Vega launcher; this envisioned module would transfer payloads between low Earth orbit (LEO) and a geostationary orbit (GEO). During November 2005, it was reported that both Israel and India had shown formal interest in the Vega programme. In December 2005, the Vega launcher, along with the Ariane and Soyuz launchers, were endorsed as the recognised "first choice" platforms for ESA payloads. On 19 December 2005, the first test firing of the Vega's third stage was completed successfully at Salto di Quirra, Sardinia. For several years, further tests would be conducted at the Sardinia site. Progress on Vega was delayed by the failure of one such test of the third stage on 28 March 2007.

During January 2007, European Space Agency (ESA) announced that the agency was studying the use of Global Positioning System (GPS) navigation in order to support launches of the Vega and Ariane. At the 2009 Paris Air Show, it was revealed that the adoption of more cost-effective engine to replace the upper stages of the Vega have been postponed due to a failure to reduce the overall costs of the launcher, making it much less worthwhile to pursue. Despite this finding, efforts to improve the efficiency of the third stage continued. At this point, the certification of all four stages of the Vega launch was anticipated to be achieved prior to the end of 2009, while the first launch was scheduled to take place during 2010. The first flight was intended to be flown with a scientific payload, rather than a "dummy" placeholder; but had intentionally avoided a costly commercial satellite. By late 2010, the first flight had been delayed into 2011.

=== Into flight ===
During October 2011, all major components of the first Vega rocket departed Avio's Colleferro facility, near Rome, by sea for Kourou. At this point, the first launch was anticipated to occur during December 2011 or January 2012. During early January 2012, it was reported that the launch date would slip into the following month. On 13 February 2012, the first launch of the Vega rocket occurred from Kourou; it was reported as being an "apparently perfect flight".

During mid-2011, it was postulated that an evolved 'Europeanised' upgrade of the Vega rocket could be developed in the medium-to-long term future. Following the successful first launch, various improvements for the Vega were postulated. The German Aerospace Center (DLR) was reportedly enthusiastic on the prospects of developing a European alternative to the Vega's final, fourth stage; however, it was widely believed that there should be no change to Vega hardware for roughly 10 years in order to consolidate operations and avoid unnecessary costs early on. European Space Agency (ESA) was also keen to take advantage of potential commonalities between the Vega and the proposed Ariane 6 heavy launcher.

Following on from the first launch, a further four flights were conducted under the vestiges of the VERTA programme (Vega Research and Technology Accompaniment), during which observation or scientific payloads were orbited while validating and readying the Vega rocket for more lucrative commercial operations. The second launch, performed on 6 May 2013, which followed a considerably more demanding flight profile and carried the type's first commercial payload, was also successful. In the aftermath of this second launch, European Space Agency (ESA) declared the Vega rocket to be "fully functional". The lapse of more than one year between the inaugural flight and the second one was mainly due to the fact that the Italian manufacturer had to completely redevelop the Flight Control Software, due to the restrictions on French export control imposed on the software used on the first flight.

Since entering commercial service, Arianespace markets Vega as a launch system tailored for missions to polar and Sun-synchronous orbits. During its qualification flight, Vega placed its main payload the 386.8-kilogram (853 lb) LARES satellite, into a circular orbit at the altitude of 1,450 kilometres (900 mi) with an inclination of 69.5°.

== Specifications ==
=== Technical specifications ===
Stage	Stage 1 P80FW	Stage 2 Zefiro 23	Stage 3 Zefiro 9	Stage 4 AVUM
Height	11.7 m (38 ft 5 in)	7.5 m (24 ft 7 in)	3.5 m (11 ft 6 in)	1.7 m (5 ft 7 in)
Diameter	3 m (9 ft 10 in)	1.9 m (6 ft 3 in)	1.9 m (6 ft 3 in)	1.9 m (6 ft 3 in)
Propellant type	Solid (HTPB/AP/Al)	Solid (HTPB/AP/Al)	Solid (HTPB/AP/Al)	Liquid (UDMH/N_{2}O_{4})
Propellant mass	88,365 kg (194,811 lb)	24,000 kg (53,000 lb)	10,500 kg (23,100 lb)	550 kg (1,210 lb)
Motor dry mass	7,330 kg (16,160 lb)	1,950 kg (4,300 lb)	915 kg (2,017 lb)	131 kg (289 lb)
Motor case mass	3,260 kg (7,190 lb)	900 kg (2,000 lb)	400 kg (880 lb)	16 kg (35 lb)
Average thrust	2,200 kN (490,000 lb_{f})	871 kN (196,000 lb_{f})	260 kN (58,000 lb_{f})	2.42 kN (540 lb_{f})
Burn time	114 sec.	77 sec.	120 sec.	Up to 667 sec.
Specific impulse	280 s (2.7 km/s)	287.5 s (2.819 km/s)	296 s (2.90 km/s)	315.5 s (3.094 km/s)

=== Payload ===
Arianespace had indicated that the Vega launcher was able to carry 1,500 kg (3,300 lb) to a circular polar orbit at an altitude of 700 km (430 mi).

The payload fairing of the Vega was designed and was manufactured by RUAG Space of Switzerland. It has a diameter of 2.6 metres (8 ft 6 in), a height of 7.8 metres (25 ft 7 in) and a mass of 400 kg. The cylindrical part of the fairing has an outer diameter 2.6 metres (8 ft 6 in) and a height of 3.5 metres (11 ft 6 in).

=== Three solid motor stages ===
The first three stages are solid propellant engines produced by Avio, that was the prime contractor for the Vega launcher through its company ELV.

As of 2011, the design and production process of the three engine types intended for the three stages of Vega were planned to be verified in two ground-test firings — one for design evaluation and one in the final flight configuration.

==== P80FW ====
The P80FW was the first stage of Vega and its designation reflected its characteristics: "P" stands for powder (the French term for solid propellant), "80" refers to its roughly 80 tonnes of propellant (later increased to 88 tonnes), and "FW" signifies filament wound referring to the construction of the motor casing as a single-piece carbon-fibre composite shell.

The P80FW included a thrust vectoring control (TVC) system, developed and made in Belgium by SABCA, consisting of two electromechanical actuators that operate a movable nozzle with flexible joint using lithium-ion batteries. The 3 m diameter case was composed of graphite epoxy filament wound case and low density rubber was used for the internal insulation. The nozzle was made of light low-cost carbon phenolic material; a consumable casing was used for the igniter. The solid propellant loaded has low binder content and high aluminium percentage (HTPB 1912).

The first test firing of the P80FW engine took place on 30 November 2006 in Kourou, and the test was concluded successfully.

The second test firing of the P80FW first stage engine took place on 4 December 2007 in Kourou. Delivering a mean thrust of 190 tonnes over 111 seconds, the engine's behaviour was in line with predictions.

The future version of the stage, P120C, also with its name derived from the design phase propellant weight of 120 tonnes, will increase the propellant mass to 141–143 tonnes.

==== Zefiro 23 ====
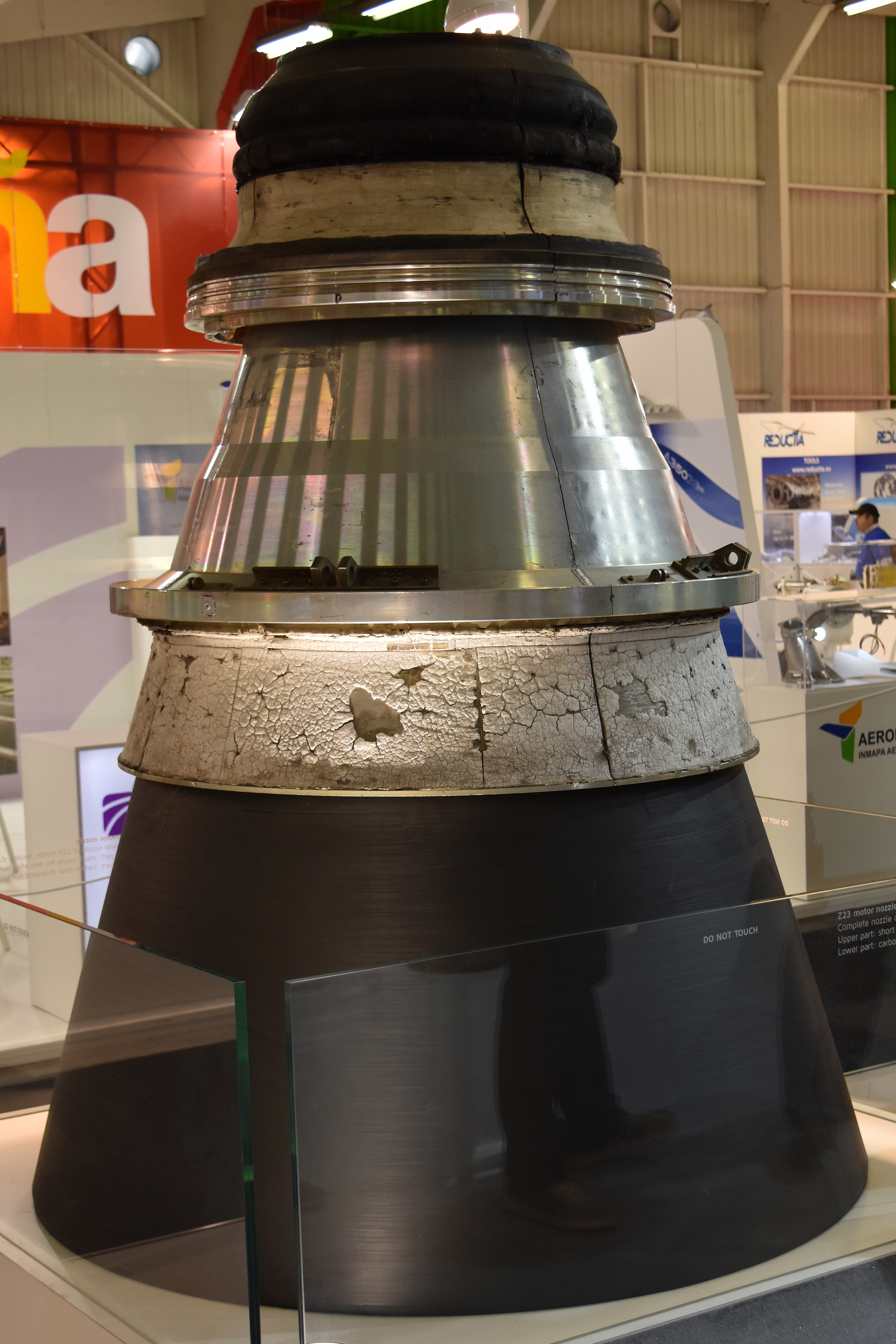
Nozzle of the Zefiro 23, Paris Air Show 2015

The development of the Zefiro motor was initiated by Avio, partially funded by the company and partially funded by a contract from the Italian Space Agency (ISA). A Zefiro 23 forms the second stage of Vega. Its carbon-epoxy case was filament-wound and its carbon phenolic nozzle includes a carbon-carbon throat insert. The propellant loading was 23 tonnes (51,000 lb).

The Zefiro 23 second stage engine was first fired on 26 June 2006 at Salto di Quirra. This test was successful.

The second test firing of the Zefiro 23 second stage engine took place on 27 March 2008 also at Salto di Quirra. This successful test qualified the rocket engine.

==== Zefiro 9 ====
The first engine completed was Zefiro 9, the third-stage engine. The first test firing was carried out on 20 December 2005, at the Salto di Quirra Inter-force Test Range, on the Mediterranean coast in southeast Sardinia. The test was a complete success.

After a critical design review based on the completed first test firings, the second test-firing of the Zefiro 9 took place at Salto di Quirra on 28 March 2007. After 35 seconds, there was a sudden drop in the motor's internal pressure, leading to an increased combustion time. No public information was available for this sudden drop of internal pressure, and whether any flaws were present in the motor's design.

On 23 October 2008, an enhanced version of the Zefiro 9 with a modified nozzle design, the Zefiro 9-A, was successfully tested.

On 28 April 2009, the final qualification test firing of Zefiro 9-A took place at the Salto di Quirra Interforce Test Range in Sardinia, Italy.

=== Attitude & Vernier Upper Module (AVUM) ===
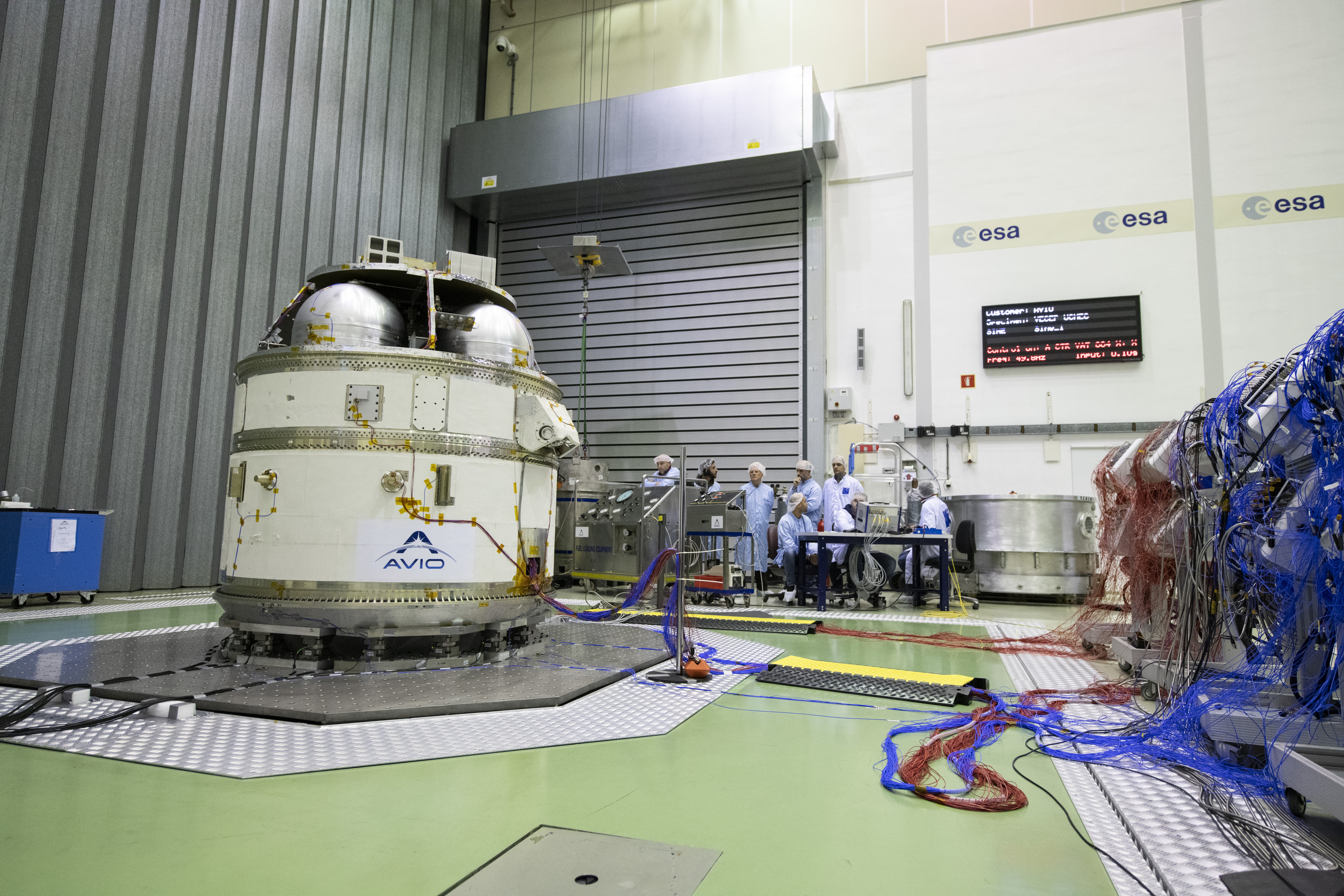
AVUM undergoing vibration test at ESTEC Test Centre in Noordwijk.

The Attitude & Vernier Upper Module (AVUM), developed by Avio, serves as the upper stage (fourth stage) of the Vega rocket, designed to place payloads into precise orbits while performing roll and attitude control functions. It is composed of two main components: the AVUM Propulsion Module (APM) and the AVUM Avionics Module (AAM). The APM is powered by the Ukrainian-built RD-843 rocket engine, a lightweight, pressure-fed liquid-fuel system that uses unsymmetrical dimethylhydrazine (UDMH) fuel and dinitrogen tetroxide (N_{2}O_{4}) oxidizer as propellants. This engine is capable of multiple restarts, enabling high-precision orbital adjustments, multi-payload deployment, and controlled de-orbiting to reduce space debris. The AAM houses the vehicle’s core avionics subsystem, integrating advanced guidance, navigation, and control systems.

== Variants ==
There was a concept study for a new medium-size launcher based on Vega and Ariane 5 elements. This launcher would use an Ariane 5 P230 first stage, a Vega P80 second stage and an Ariane 5 third stage using either storable or cryogenic fuel.

The future upgraded Vega (LYRA program) has exceeded the feasibility study and was planned to replace the current third and fourth stages with a single low cost LOX/Liquid methane stage with a new guidance system. The purpose of the program was to upgrade the performance by about 30% without significant price increase.

On 14 February 2012, one day after the successful first launch of Vega, the German Aerospace Center (DLR) moved to be included in the program. Johann-Dietrich Wörner, at that time head of DLR, said Germany wanted to join the project. Germany would provide a replacement for the RD-843 engine on the AVUM fourth stage, currently made in Ukraine. The Vega launcher manager stated that it will not fly in the near future because it takes some time to develop, but he confirmed it will be on agenda in the next meeting of ministers in late 2012. That way, all components of the rocket would be built inside the European Union (EU), excluding the Swiss made ones.

The revised Vega-C first stage, renamed P120C (Common), has been selected as booster for the first stage of the next generation Ariane 6 rocket at European Space Agency (ESA) Council meeting at Ministerial level in December 2014.

Avio was also considering a "Vega Light" that would omit the first stage of either the Vega-C or Vega-E and would be targeted at replenishing satellite constellations. The vehicle would be capable of launching between 250–300 kg or 400–500 kg depending on whether it was derived from a Vega-C or Vega-E, respectively.

=== Vega C ===
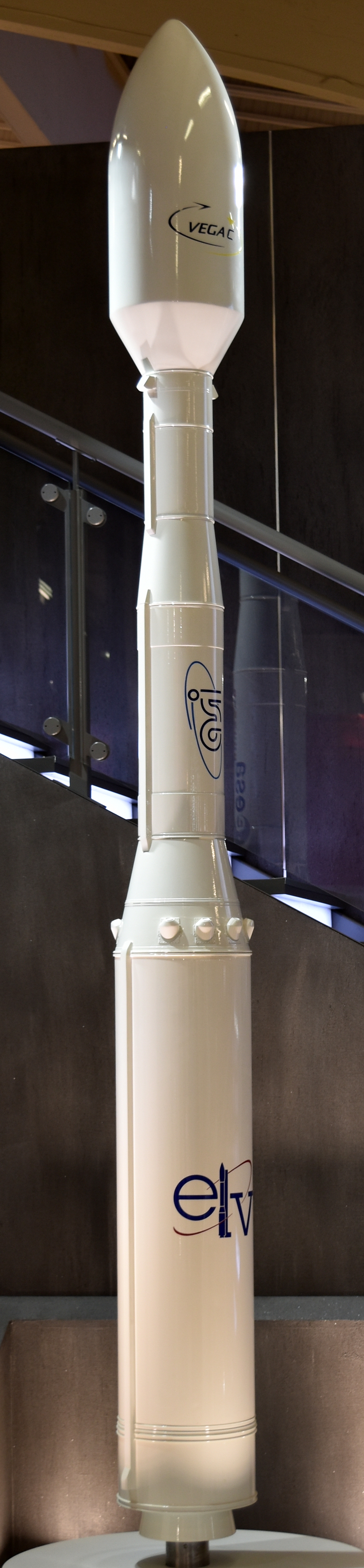
Model of Vega-C at Paris Air Show 2015

Vega C was an evolution on the original Vega launcher to enable better launch performance and flexibility. Development started following the December 2014 ESA Ministerial Council with the goal to meet the change in payload demands, both in regards to an increase in medium-sized institutional payloads, and to compete with cheaper launch providers.

This new evolution incorporates various changes to the Vega stack. The first stage P80FW motor will be replaced with the P120C, the same booster due to be used on the Ariane 6 launcher, and the Zefiro 23 second stage will also be replaced with the Zefiro 40. The larger AVUM+ will replace the AVUM fourth stage, while the third Zefiro 9 stage will be carried over from the base version of the launcher.

These modifications will enable new mission parameters using various payload adapters and upper stages. The new rocket will be able to carry dual payloads using the Vespa-C payload adapter, or a single large satellite in addition to smaller payloads using the Vampire and SMSS multiple payload dispenser. Orbital transfer capability was also available with the Vega Electrical Nudge Upper Stage, or VENUS.

Return missions are also available using the reusable Space Rider vehicle, currently in development by ESA and due to launch on a Vega-C no earlier than July 2025.

On 13 July 2022, Vega-C had its debut flight, during which it delivered the LARES 2 and six other satellites to orbit. This launch came as a way of filling the gap after the Russian rockets became unavailable due to the invasion of Ukraine. On 21 December 2022 (UTC), Vega-C suffered a launch failure due to an anomaly with the Zefiro 40 second stage resulting in the loss of two spacecraft for the Airbus Pléiades Neo Earth-imaging constellation.

Following the failure, the next launch was delayed until late 2024 to allow the redesign of a rocket motor nozzle.

=== Vega-E ===
The Vega E (or Vega Evolution) is a further evolution of the Vega-C. The first stage P120C motor will be replaced with the P160C, the same booster due to be used on the Ariane 6 Block 2 launcher.

The Zefiro 9 and AVUM+ third and fourth stages will be replaced with a cryogenic upper stage powered by liquid oxygen and liquid methane. This variant offers even more flexibility than Vega-C, with the ability to deliver multiple satellites into different orbits on a single launch.

As of March 2021 Avio was finalizing the development of the new M10 methane engine used in the new upper stage. The engine design was the result of a collaboration between Avio and Chemical Automatics Design Bureau (KBKhA) ended in 2014.

Avio successfully conducted the first series of testing of the M10 engine between May and July 2022 with the maiden flight of the Vega-E planned for 2027.

== Costs ==
Development costs for the Vega rocket totaled €710 million, with ESA spending an additional €400 million to sponsor five development flights between 2012 and 2014. Estimates of commercial launch costs in 2012 were projected to be €32 million, including Arianespace's marketing and service costs, or €25 million for each rocket alone, assuming a launch rate of 2 per year.

"Our belief was that we can charge up to 20% more per launch than our biggest competitors and still win business because of the value we provide at the space center here and with Arianespace"

— Francesco De Pasquale, managing director of ELV SpA, 2012, SpaceNews

In 2012, the managing director of ELV estimated that if the sustained flight rate were to increase to four flights per year, the price of each individual launch vehicle could potentially decrease to €22 million.

In the event, by November 2020, Vega had never flown more than three flights in a single year, with an average flight rate of just under two launches per year.

== List of flights ==
Flight	Date / time (UTC)	Payload	Payload mass	Orbit	Launch Outcome
VV01	13 February 2012; 10:00:00	LARES; ALMASat-1; e-st@r; Goliat; MaSat-1; PW-Sat; ROBUSTA; UniCubeSat-GG; Xatcobeo	680 kg (1,500 lb)	LEO	Success
VV02	7 May 2013; 02:06:31	PROBA-V; VNREDSat 1A; ESTCube-1	254.83 kg (561.8 lb)	SSO	Success
VV03	30 April 2014; 01:35:15	KazEOSat 1	830 kg (1,830 lb)	SSO	Success
VV04	11 February 2015; 13:40:00	IXV	1,845 kg (4,068 lb)	TAO	Success
VV05	23 June 2015; 01:51:58	Sentinel-2A	1,130 kg (2,490 lb)	SSO	Success
VV06	3 December 2015; 04:04:00	LISA Pathfinder	1,906 kg (4,202 lb)	Halo orbit Earth–Sun L1	Success
VV07	16 September 2016; 01:43:35	PeruSat-1; 4 × Terra Bella satellites	870 kg (1,920 lb)	SSO	Success
VV08	5 December 2016; 13:51:44	Göktürk-1A	1,060 kg (2,340 lb)	SSO	Success
VV09	7 March 2017; 01:49:24	Sentinel-2B	1,130 kg (2,490 lb)	SSO	Success
VV10	2 August 2017; 01:58:33	OPTSAT-3000; VENμS	632 kg (1,393 lb)	SSO	Success
VV11	8 November 2017; 01:42:31	Mohammed VI-A (MN35-13A)	1,110 kg (2,450 lb)	SSO	Success
VV12	22 August 2018; 21:20:09	ADM-Aeolus	1,357 kg (2,992 lb)	SSO	Success
VV13	21 November 2018; 01:42:31	Mohammed VI-B (MN35-13B)	1,108 kg (2,443 lb)	SSO	Success
VV14	22 March 2019; 01:50:35	PRISMA	879 kg (1,938 lb)	SSO	Success
VV15	11 July 2019; 01:53	Falcon Eye 1	1,197 kg (2,639 lb)	SSO	Failure
VV16	3 September 2020; 01:51:10	SSMS PoC Flight (53 satellites)		SSO	Success
VV17	17 November 2020; 01:52:20	SEOSat-Ingenio and TARANIS	925 kg (2,039 lb)	SSO	Failure
VV18	29 April 2021; 01:50	Pléiades Neo 3; NorSat-3; Bravo; ELO Alpha; Lemur-2 × 2	1,278 kg (2,818 lb)	SSO	Success
VV19	17 August 2021; 01:47	Pléiades Neo 4; BRO-4; LEDSAT; RADCUBE; SUNSTORM	1,029 kg (2,269 lb)	SSO	Success
VV20	16 November 2021; 09:27:55	CERES 1/2/3	1,548 kg (3,413 lb)	Semi-synchronous	Success
VV23	9 October 2023; 01:36	THEOS-2; TRITON; ANSER × 3; CSC × 2; ESTCube-2; MACSAT; N3SS; PRETTY; PROBA-V CC		SSO	Success
VV24	5 September 2024; 01:50	Sentinel-2C	1,143 kg (2,520 lb)	SSO	Success

== Comparable rockets ==
- Delta II 7420 (retired)
- Epsilon
- Firefly Alpha
- Minotaur IV
- Minotaur-C
- Rokot (retired)
- Soyuz-2-1v
- Polar Satellite Launch Vehicle

== See also ==
- Vega-C
- List of Vega launches
- Solid rocket
- Comparison of orbital launchers families
- Comparison of orbital launch systems
