= Young Engineers' Satellite =

Dutch satellite launched in 1997

- COSPAR ID: 1997-066C
- SATCAT no.: 25025

Start of mission
- Launch date: 30 October 1997 13:43 UTC
- Rocket: Ariane 5G
- Launch site: Guiana Space Center, ELA-3

End of mission
- Declared: 3 November 1997

Orbital parameters
- Inclination: 7.6°
- Period: 467.7 min

The Young Engineers' Satellite (YES, also known as TEAMSAT: Technology, science and Education experiments Added to Maqsat) was a European satellite built by Delta-Utec SRC. The project was coordinated by the European Space Agency (ESA).

The project was proposed in October 1996 at the International Astronautical Congress (IAC) meeting in Beijing. On 30 October 1997, the Young Engineers' Satellite was launched from the Guiana Space Center aboard the second Ariane 5 rocket.

The satellite was built in six months by forty engineers and students from ten different countries as well as several experienced ESA specialists. The construction phase took place at the Erasmus High Bay at the European Space Research and Technology Centre (ESTEC) in Noordwijk, Netherlands.

Several experiments were on board the satellite: a GPS receiver, a webcam attached to a custom-built on-board computer, and a tether experiment. The tether experiment could not be carried out due to a change in orbit shortly before launch, implemented to avoid endangering other satellites in Geostationary transfer orbit.

== See also ==
- List of European Space Agency programmes and missions
- Young Engineers' Satellite 2
- YPSat-1
