= Mohammed VI (satellites) =

Moroccan Earth observation satellites

- Mission type: Earth observation and reconnaissance
- Operator: Government of Morocco
- COSPAR ID: 2017-070A (A); 2018-095A (B)
- SATCAT no.: 43005 (A); 43717 (B)
- Mission duration: 5 years (planned); 8 years, 11 months, 16 days (elapsed; A); 7 years, 11 months, 3 days (elapsed; B)

Spacecraft properties
- Spacecraft: Mohammed VI-A; Mohammed VI-B
- Spacecraft type: Observation satellite
- Bus: Astrosat-1000
- Manufacturer: Airbus Defence and Space; Thales Alenia Space
- Launch mass: 1,110 kg (2,450 lb)

Start of mission
- Launch date: November 8, 2017 (A); November 21, 2018 (B)
- Rocket: Vega
- Launch site: Guiana Space Centre ELA-1
- Contractor: Arianespace

Orbital parameters
- Reference system: Geocentric
- Regime: Low Earth
- Semi-major axis: 7,106 km (4,415 mi) (A); 7,106 km (4,415 mi) (B)
- Periapsis altitude: 644.8 km (400.7 mi) (A); 644.6 km (400.5 mi) (B)
- Apoapsis altitude: 646.5 km (401.7 mi) (A); 646.7 km (401.8 mi) (B)
- Inclination: 97.9°
- Period: 97.5 minutes

The Mohammed VI satellites are a series of two Moroccan Earth observation and reconnaissance satellites, namely Mohammed VI-A and Mohammed VI-B, developed and built by Airbus Defence and Space and Thales Alenia Space based upon the Astrosat-1000 satellite bus. They are Morocco's first optical imaging satellites, and are operated by Morocco's Ministry of Defense, with an expected service life of 5 years. They are named after Mohammed VI, the King of Morocco.

== Design ==
=== Satellite bus ===
Both satellites are based on the Astrosat-1000 satellite bus. They have a launch mass of 1,110 kg (2,450 lb) and have three deployable solar arrays, and an expected service life of around 5 years.

=== Propulsion ===
The satellites have four hydrazine thrusters for reboosting its orbit and keeping its altitude.

== Launch ==
=== Mohammed VI-A ===
The Mohammed VI-A satellite, Morocco's first spy satellite, was launched on Vega flight VV11 on board the Vega launcher from Guiana Space Centre ELA-1, French Guiana, on November 8, 2017. It was launched to low Earth Sun-synchronous orbit with an inclination of 97.9°.

=== Mohammed VI-B ===
The Mohammed VI-B satellite, Morocco's second spy satellite, was launched a year later on Vega flight VV14 from Guiana Space Centre ELA-1, French Guiana, on November 28, 2018. It was launched to Low Earth Sun-synchronous orbit with an inclination of 97.9°.

== See also ==
- List of Earth observation satellites
- Royal Center for Remote Sensing
