= HM4 =

- Country of origin: France
- Designer: Société d'Etudes pour la Propulsion par Réaction
- Application: Cryogenic Engine Testbed
- Successor: HM7
- Status: Retired

Liquid-fuel engine
- Propellant: LOX / LH_{2}
- Mixture ratio: 5:1
- Cycle: Gas-generator

Configuration
- Chamber: 4

Performance
- Thrust: 40 kN (8,992 lb_{f})
- Chamber pressure: 24kg/cm^{2}
- Specific impulse, vacuum: 412 s (4.04 km/s)

Dimensions
- Dry mass: 198 kg (437 lb)

References
- Notes: Testbed engine, never flew

The HM4 was a first non-American cryogenic rocket engine. Developed in France between 1967 and 1969 it never flew into space, was used purely as a testbed for new technologies. Technologies developed in HM4 become a base for HM7 engine used in Ariane.

== History ==
HM4 evolved from a liquid fuel combustion chamber development projects H2 and H3 led by Société d'Etudes pour la Propulsion par Réaction (SERP) tested between 1961 and 1963 with an intention of using H2 as an upper stage to proposed Diamant Hydrogen variant with a turbopump derived from Mirage IIIC. However, both projects were abandoned in 1964 and replaced by HM4 engine in 4-chamber configuration producing 40 kN (8,992 lb_{f}) each for a total of 160 kN (35,970 lb_{f}). First test of a new engine concluded in March 1967. In total 85 trials of HM4 took place with a combined burn time of 2300 seconds, including the longest tested burn time of 350 seconds. Engine was proposed by SERP to be used in ELDO-B project, an evolution of Europa rocket, in a single-chamber configuration to be developed by Rolls-Royce, however project was canceled in 1969 and instead development focused on HM7 which was later used in Ariane 1 upper stage.
