= HM7B =

European rocket engine

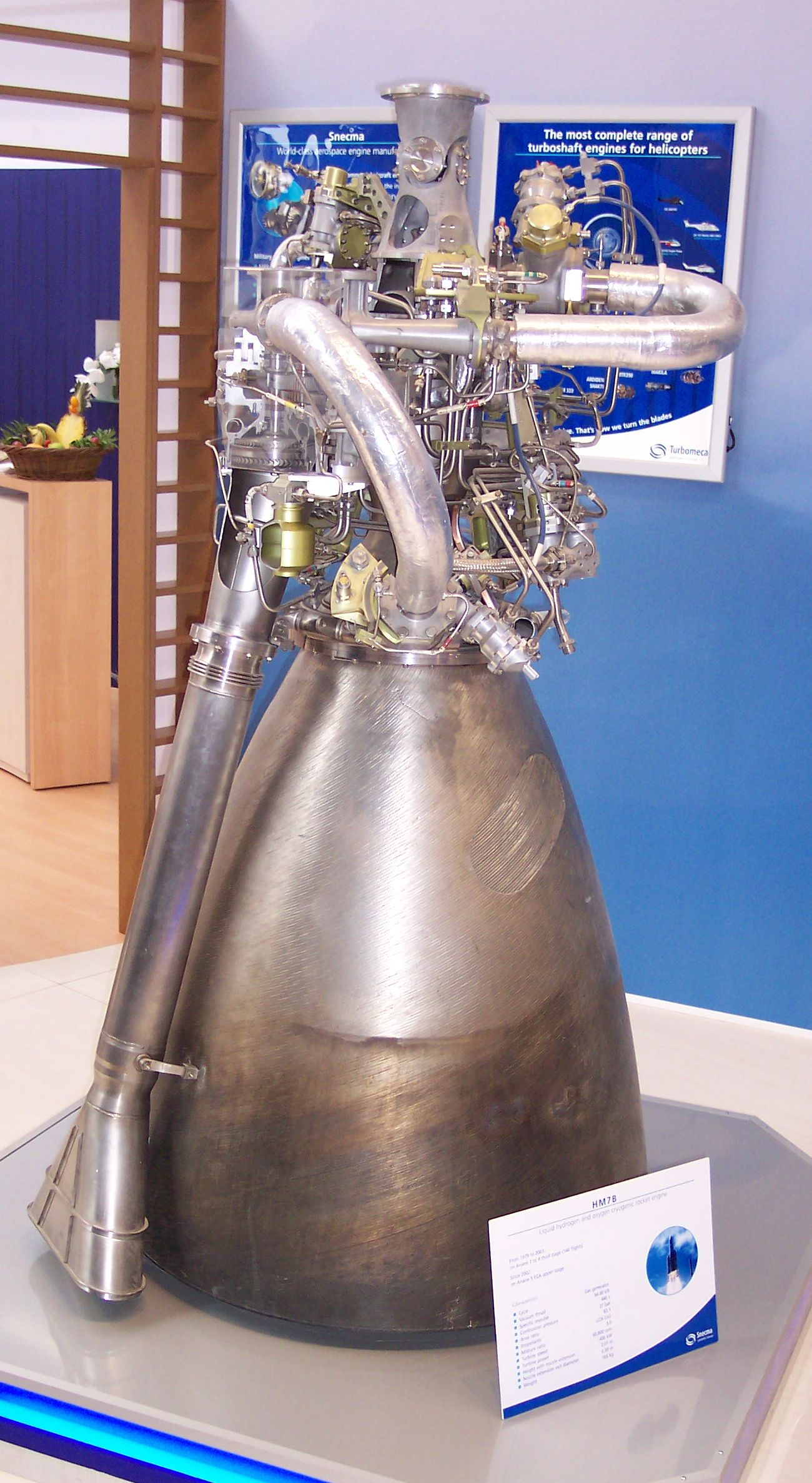
- Country of origin: France
- First flight: 24 December 1979
- Designer: Snecma
- Manufacturer: Snecma
- Application: Upper stage engine
- Predecessor: HM4
- Successor: Vinci
- Status: Retired

Liquid-fuel engine
- Propellant: LOX / LH_{2}
- Mixture ratio: 5:1
- Cycle: Gas-generator

Configuration
- Chamber: 1
- Nozzle ratio: 83.1:1

Performance
- Thrust, vacuum: 62.2 kN (13,980 lb_{f})
- Chamber pressure: 3.7 MPa (37 bar)
- Specific impulse, vacuum: 444.6 s (4.36 km/s)

Dimensions
- Length: 2.01 m (6 ft 7 in)
- Diameter: 0.992 m (3 ft 3.1 in)
- Dry mass: 165 kg (364 lb)

Used in
- HM7B: Ariane 5 ECA; Ariane 4; Ariane 3; Ariane 2; HM7(A): Ariane 1

The HM7B was a European cryogenic upper stage rocket engine used on the vehicles in the Ariane rocket family. It was replaced by Vinci, which acts as the new upper stage engine on Ariane 6. Nearly 300 engines have been produced to date.

== History ==
The development of HM7 engine begun in 1973 on a base of HM4 rocket engine. It was designed to power a third stage of newly constructed Ariane 1, the first launch system for European Space Agency. Maiden flight took place on 24 December 1979 successfully placing CAT-1 satellite on the orbit. With the later introduction of Ariane 2 and Ariane 3 it became necessary to improve the performance of the upper stage engine. This was achieved by extending the nozzle length and increasing the chamber pressure from 30 to 35 bar, increasing the engine's specific impulse and resulting in a nominal burn time increase from 570 to 735 seconds. Qualification tests were completed in 1983 and this upgraded variant was designated HM7B. It was also used on the Ariane 4 vehicle's upper stage where the burn time was further increased to 780 seconds, and since 12 February 2005 it's also used on the upper stage of Ariane 5 ECA.

== Overview ==
The HM7B is a regeneratively cooled gas generator rocket engine fed with liquid oxygen and liquid hydrogen. It has no restart capability: the engine is continuously fired for 950 seconds in its Ariane 5 version (780 s in the Ariane 4). It provides 62.7 kN of thrust with a specific impulse of 444.6 s. The engine's chamber pressure is 3.5 MPa.

== See also ==
- Spacecraft propulsion
- Timeline of hydrogen technologies
- Comparison of orbital rocket engines
- HM4

=== Comparable engines ===
- YF-75
- RL10
- Vinci
- CE-7.5
