= Intelsat VA F-15 =

Communications satellite

Intelsat VA F-15 → Columbia 515
- Mission type: Communication
- Operator: Intelsat / Columbia Communications Corporation
- COSPAR ID: 1989-006A
- SATCAT no.: 19772
- Mission duration: 7 years (planned)

Spacecraft properties
- Bus: Intelsat VA
- Manufacturer: Ford Aerospace
- Launch mass: 1981 kg
- Dry mass: 1098 kg
- Dimensions: 1.66 x 2.1 x 1.77 metres
- Power: 1800 watts

Start of mission
- Launch date: 27 January 1989, 01:21:00 UTC
- Rocket: Ariane 2 V28
- Launch site: Kourou, ELA-1
- Contractor: Aérospatiale

End of mission
- Disposal: Graveyard orbit
- Deactivated: November 2002

Orbital parameters
- Reference system: Geocentric orbit
- Regime: Geostationary orbit
- Longitude: 60.0° East (1989-1992), 18.0° West (1992-1996), 21.5° West (1996-1998), 37.8° West (1998-2002)
- Epoch: 27 January 1989

Transponders
- Band: 29 C-band; 6 Ku-band

Intelsat VA F-15 or Intelsat 515, then named Columbia 515, was a communications satellite operated by Intelsat and which was later sold to Columbia Communications Corporation. Launched in 1989, it was the fifteenth of fifteen Intelsat V satellites to be launched. The Intelsat V series was constructed by Ford Aerospace, based on the Intelsat VA satellite bus. Intelsat VA F-15 was part of an advanced series of satellites designed to provide greater telecommunications capacity for Intelsat's global network, from an orbital station at 60.0° East.

== Satellite ==
The satellite was box-shaped, measuring 1.66 by 2.1 by 1.77 metres; solar arrays spanned 15.9 metres tip to tip. The arrays, supplemented by nickel-hydrogen batteries during eclipse, provided 1800 watts of power at mission onset, approximately 1280 watts at the end of its seven-year design life. The payload housed 29 C-band and 6 Ku-band transponders. It could accommodate 15,000 two-way voice circuits and two TV channels simultaneously. It also provided maritime communications for ships at sea.

== Launch ==
The satellite was successfully launched into space on 27 January 1989, at 01:21:00 UTC, by means of an Ariane 2 vehicle from the Crentre Spatial Guyanais, Kourou, French Guiana. It had a launch mass of 1981 kg.

== Columbia 515 ==
From 1 April 1998, the satellite was used by Columbia Communications Corporation and renamed Columbia 515. The Ku-band payload was not used anymore. Columbia Communications was granted the right to operate a C-Band satellite by the FCC as a replacement at the location, 37.8° West. It was deactivated in November 2002.
