= Royal Center for Remote Sensing =

- المركز الملكي للإستشعار البعدي الفضائي; Centre royal de télédétection spatiale

Agency overview
- Formed: 1989; 37 years ago
- Type: Space agency
- Headquarters: Rabat, Morocco
- Administrator: Rafiq Akram
- Website: www.crts.gov.ma

The Royal Centre for Remote Sensing (CRTS) is a Moroccan public institution responsible for implementing the national remote sensing program and developing space applications in Morocco. It plays a central role in the collection, processing, and utilization of Earth observation data, serving public policies, scientific research, and territorial development.

Established by decree in December 1989 and based in Rabat, the CRTS is tasked with promoting the use of space technologies and coordinating national activities in remote sensing. It acts as an interface between public institutions, universities, research organizations, and international partners.

The CRTS is the official distributor in Morocco of satellite imagery from SPOT, Landsat, ERS, and NOAA.

At the international level, the CRTS operates within a framework of cooperation and partnership with numerous institutions and space agencies. It notably participates in the work of the COPUOS.

== Missions ==
The CRTS has the following main missions:

- implementing the national remote sensing program;
- collecting, processing, and disseminating satellite data;
- developing applications based on Earth observation;
- supporting public policies in the fields of environment, agriculture, and spatial planning;
- training and capacity building in remote sensing and geographic information systems (GIS);
- promoting scientific research and innovation in the space sector.

== Fields of activity ==
Since its establishment, the CRTS has implemented numerous projects integrating remote sensing and geographic information systems (GIS) to meet user needs in terms of inventory, natural resource management, environmental protection, and spatial planning.

These projects are part of national development programs and take various forms (study contracts, pilot projects, national development projects, etc.). The applications developed provide strategic support for decision-making and cover several areas:

- agriculture;
- forestry and rangelands;
- land use, spatial planning, and urban development;
- coastal zones, oceanography, and fisheries resources;
- geographic information management;
- water resources and desertification control.

== Space program ==
The Royal Centre for Remote Sensing, jointly with the Institute of Aeronautics and Astronautics of the Technical University of Berlin, launched on 10 December 2001 a micro-Earth observation satellite, Maroc-TUBSAT, as part of the TUBSAT program. This satellite contributed to image acquisition and the development of national expertise in space technologies before reaching the end of its operational life.

== Role and importance ==
The CRTS is a key actor in Morocco’s space sector. It contributes to improving knowledge of the territory, the sustainable management of natural resources, and the prevention of environmental risks.

It also contributes to Morocco’s integration into international Earth observation programs and to the development of national expertise in space technologies.

== See also ==
- Mohammed VI (satellite)
- List of space agencies
