= Tele-X =

Decommissioned Nordic communications satellite

- Mission type: Communications
- Operator: Nordic Satellite AB; Swedish Space Corporation
- COSPAR ID: 1989-027A
- SATCAT no.: 19919
- Website: Tele-X at SSC
- Mission duration: 9 years (achieved)

Spacecraft properties
- Bus: Spacebus 300
- Manufacturer: Aérospatiale; Saab Ericsson Space
- Launch mass: 1,050 kg (2,310 lb)
- Power: 3 kW

Start of mission
- Launch date: 2 April 1989, 02:28:00 UTC
- Rocket: Ariane 2 (V30 - L27)
- Launch site: Centre Spatial Guyanais, ELA-1
- Contractor: Arianespace

End of mission
- Disposal: Graveyard orbit
- Deactivated: 16 January 1998

Orbital parameters
- Reference system: Geocentric orbit
- Regime: Geostationary orbit

Tele-X was the first communications satellite serving the Nordic countries. It was launched with an Ariane 2 launch vehicle from Kourou, French Guiana, on 2 April 1989. On 16 January 1998, its fuel was exhausted and it was moved into graveyard orbit. The project was managed and operated by the Swedish Space Corporation (SCC), but it was built by Aérospatiale and Saab Ericsson Space, based on the Spacebus 300 series.

Some of the TV channels it broadcast was TV4 Sweden, Kanal 5 Sweden, NRK and Filmnet. In addition, it broadcast radio for TT, The Voice Danmark, Radio Sweden, Rix FM, Mix Megapol and NRJ. It was also used for Internet communication for universities in Eastern Europe.
