= OIP Sensor Systems =

Belgian defence company

- Formerly: Optronic Instruments and Products (OIP); Optiques et Instruments de Précision (OIP)
- Company type: N.V./S.A.
- Industry: Defense and Space
- Founded: 1919
- Headquarters: Oudenaarde, Belgium
- Number of employees: ~100
- Parent: Elbit Systems
- Website: www.oip.be

OIP Sensor Systems is a Belgian defence and space company. It is a subsidiary of the Israeli company Elbit Systems.

== History ==
The company was founded in Ghent in 1919 as Optique et Instruments de Précision (Precision Optics and Instruments), as an effort of Belgium to develop its own optical industry for its army.

From its foundation until the 1950s, OIP developed military lenses and objectives, medical and scientific microscopes, as well as cameras and photocopy machines for the industry. From the 1960s on, it was one of the first European companies to enter the emerging electro-optical market, with innovations such as one of the first heads-up display for the Lockheed F-104 Starfighter and fire control systems for the Leopard 1 battle tanks in Belgium, Canada and Australia together with SABCA. The company also manufactures holographic night vision goggles, and participates in space projects.

On 1 July 2003, the company was acquired from Delft Instruments (nl) by the Israeli company Elbit Systems. The company OIP is organized in two branches and 3 departments. The two branches are:

- OIP Sensor Systems (blue)

- OIP Land Systems (green)

Inside OIP Sensor Systems are the defense and the space division (yellow).

With over a century of experience, OIP SENSOR SYSTEMS specializes in the design, development & production of customized electro-optical systems for both defense & space. OIP Sensor Systems’ application areas comprise Day/night Observation, Targeting, Sighting & situational awareness for defense, law enforcement & security.

== See also ==
- PROBA-V
