= VNREDSat-1 =

Vietnamese Earth observation satellite

VNREDSat 1A
- Mission type: Earth observation
- Operator: VAST
- COSPAR ID: 2013-021B
- SATCAT no.: 39160
- Mission duration: 5 years

Spacecraft properties
- Manufacturer: EADS Astrium
- Launch mass: 120 kilograms (260 lb)

Start of mission
- Launch date: 7 May 2013, 02:06:31 UTC
- Rocket: Vega flight VV02
- Launch site: Kourou ELA-1
- Contractor: Arianespace

Orbital parameters
- Reference system: Geocentric
- Regime: Sun-synchronous
- Perigee altitude: 690 kilometres (430 mi)
- Apogee altitude: 691 kilometres (429 mi)
- Inclination: 98.16 degrees
- Period: 98.43 minutes
- Epoch: 25 January 2015, 05:27:58 UTC

VNREDSat-1 (short for Vietnam Natural Resources, Environment and Disaster Monitoring Satellite, also VNREDSat-1A) is the first optical Earth Observing satellite of Vietnam; its primary mission is to monitor and study the effects of climate change, predict and take measures to prevent natural disasters, and optimise the management of Vietnam's natural resources.

== Satellite ==
The VNREDSat-1 was built in Toulouse by EADS Astrium. During the project 15 Vietnamese engineers were integrated and trained by the Astrium team. The VNREDSat-1 system is based on the Astrium operational AstroSat100 satellite, used for the SSOT programme developed with Chile or the ALSAT-2 satellite system developed with Algeria. The 120 kg satellite will image at 2.5 m in panchromatic mode and 10 m in multi-spectral mode (four bands) with a 17.5 km swath, and will orbit at 600–700 km in a Sun-synchronous orbit.

== Launch ==
The satellite was launched from ELV at the Guiana Space Centre by the Vega VV02 rocket at 02:06:31 UTC on 7 May 2013 together with the PROBA-V and ESTCube-1 satellites.

== Successor ==
In 2026, the governments of France and Vietnam confirmed cooperation for VNREDSat-2, assisted by French financial instruments.
