= Sentinel-2A =

European optical imaging satellite

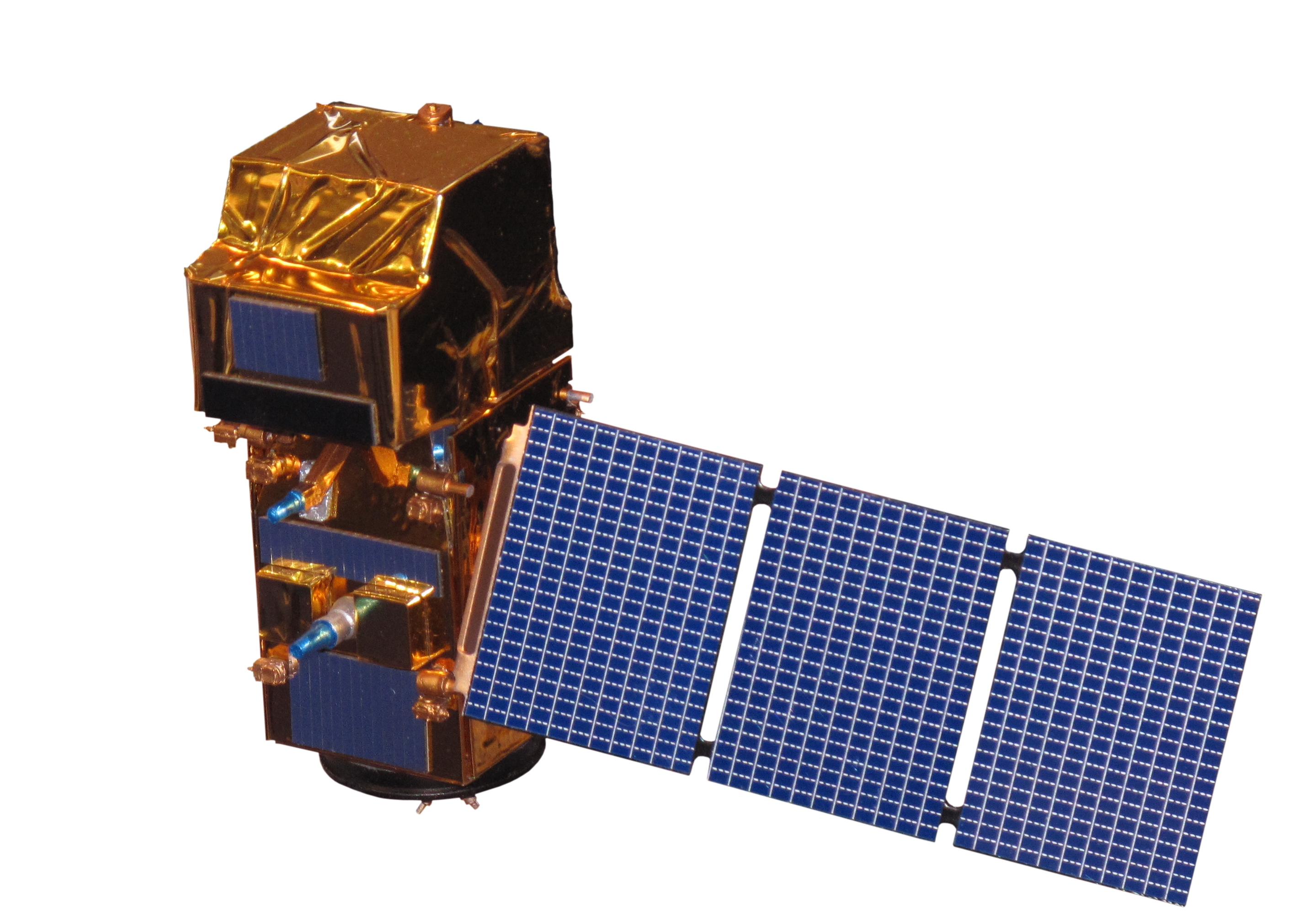
- Model of a Sentinel 2 satellite
- Mission type: Earth observation
- Operator: ESA
- COSPAR ID: 2015-028A
- SATCAT no.: 40697
- Website: Sentinel-2 (ESA)
- Mission duration: Planned: 7 years Elapsed: 10 years, 10 months, 21 days

Spacecraft properties
- Spacecraft type: Sentinel-2
- Manufacturer: Airbus Defence and Space
- Launch mass: 1,140 kg (2,510 lb)
- Dry mass: 1,017 kg (2,242 lb)
- Dimensions: 3.4 m × 1.8 m × 2.35 m (11.2 ft × 5.9 ft × 7.7 ft)
- Power: 1700 watts

Start of mission
- Launch date: 23 June 2015, 01:51:58 UTC
- Rocket: Vega (VV05)
- Launch site: Kourou SLV
- Contractor: Arianespace

Orbital parameters
- Reference system: Geocentric
- Regime: Low Earth
- Semi-major axis: 7,167.10 km (4,453.43 mi)
- Eccentricity: 0.000127
- Perigee altitude: 788.06 km (489.68 mi)
- Apogee altitude: 789.87 km (490.80 mi)
- Inclination: 98.5623°
- Period: 100.65 minutes
- Epoch: 9 March 2017, 21:05:23 UTC

Transponders
- Band: S band (TT&C support); X band and optical laser through EDRS (data acquisition)
- Bandwidth: 64 kbit/s upload (S band); 128 kbit/s - 2 Mbit/s down (S band); 520 Mbit/s down (X band/Optical)

Instruments
- Multi-Spectral Imager (MSI)

Sentinel-2A is a European optical imaging satellite launched in 2015. It is the first Sentinel-2 satellite launched by the European Space Agency's and this Sentinel is part of the European Commission's Copernicus Programme. The satellite carries a wide swath high-resolution multispectral imager with 13 spectral bands. Its observations support services such as forest monitoring, land cover change-detection, natural disaster management and water quality monitoring. On 7 March 2017 the Sentinel-2A was joined in orbit by its sister satellite, Sentinel-2B.

== Mission history ==
=== Launch ===
Sentinel-2A was launched by the Vega VV05 rocket on 23 June 2015 at 01:52 UTC. The satellite separated from the upper stage 54 min 43 s after liftoff.

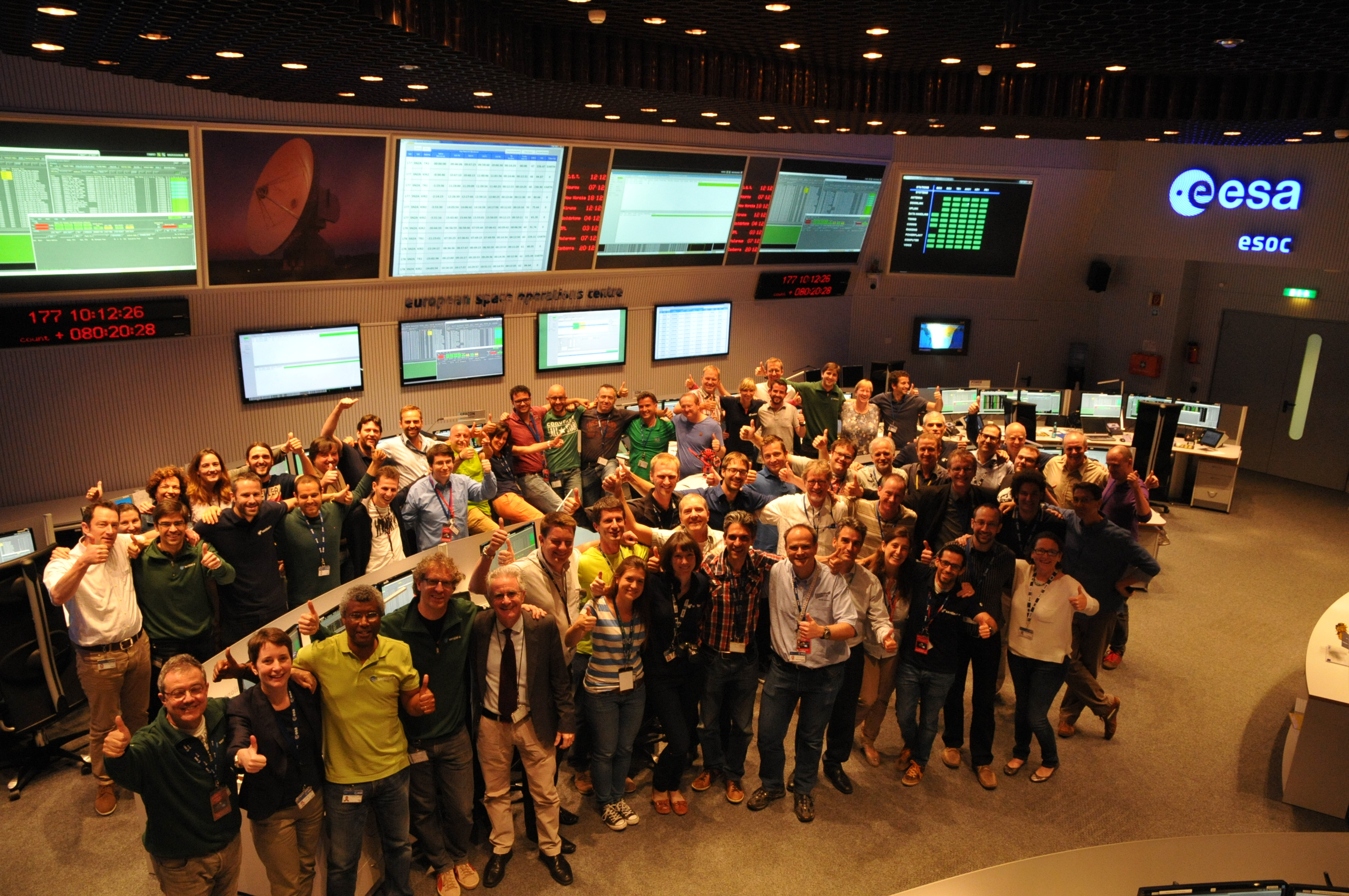
Flight controllers at ESA's ESOC celebrating end of LEOP for Sentinel-2A

=== Orbital operation ===
The satellite captured its first image 100 hours after launch, covering a 290 km (180 mi) wide swath from Sweden through Central Europe to Algeria. Commissioning occurred in October 2015.

Between 20 and 23 January 2017 the spacecraft suffered a mission planning anomaly which resulted in loss of data from its instrument, the Multi-Spectral Imager.

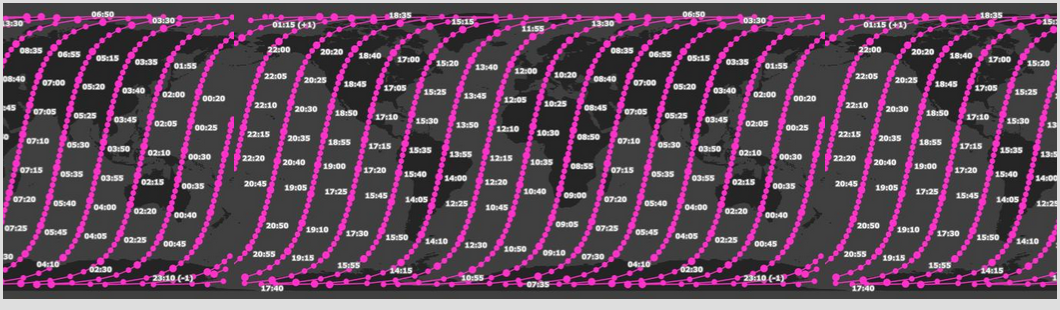
Sentinel 2A's descending orbital path

In December 2025, Sentinel-2A performed experimental night observations, something it was not designed to do, in order to test these operations for the follow-on Sentinel-2 Next Generation mission. The satellite successfully captured night-time images of gas flares from oil production in the Middle East, wildfires in India, and fishing boats off the coast of South Korea.

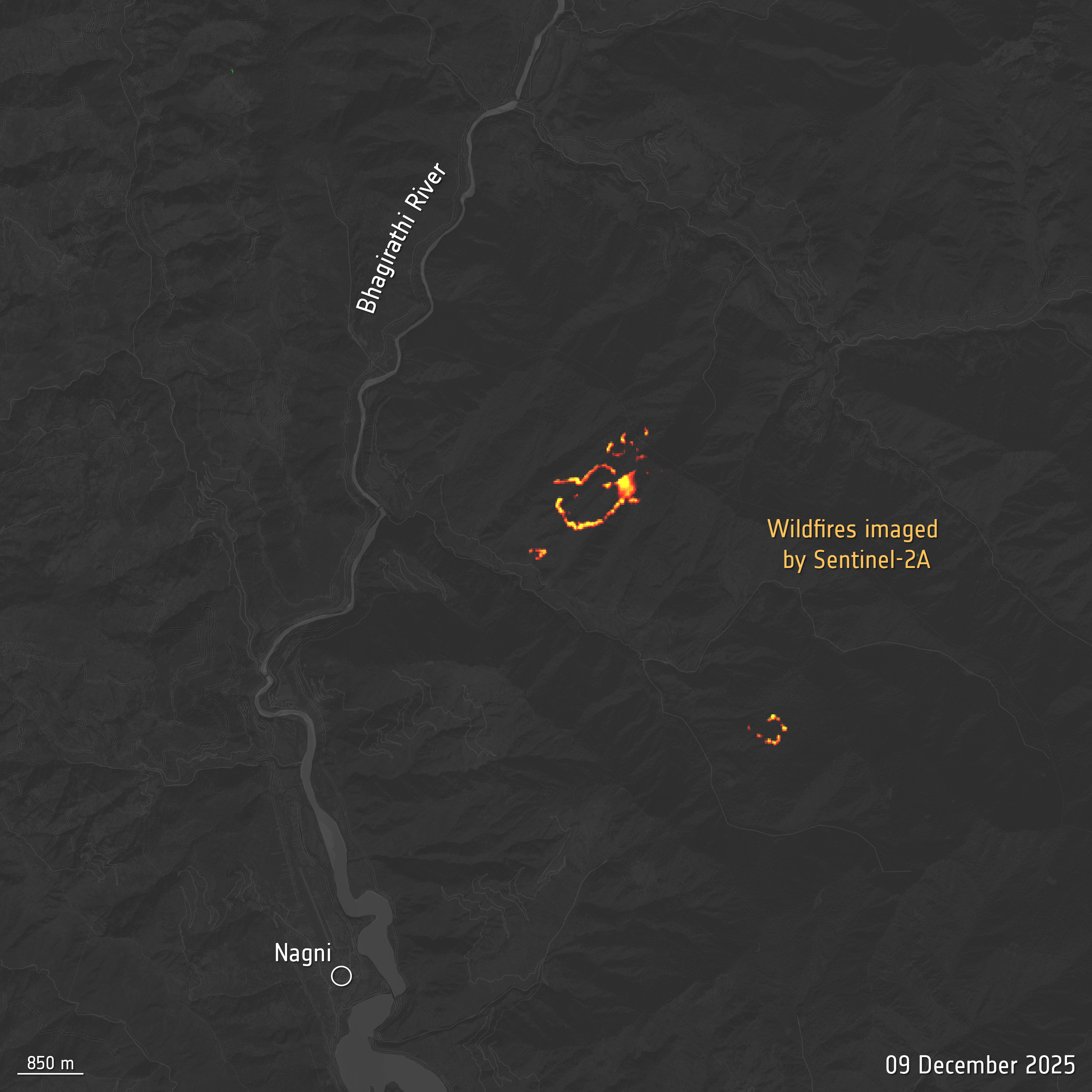
Wildfire in India imaged by Sentinel-2A at night
