= Intelsat VA F-14 =

Geostationary communications satellite

- Mission type: Communication
- Operator: Intelsat
- COSPAR ID: 1986-F05
- Mission duration: 7 years (planned)

Spacecraft properties
- Bus: Intelsat VA
- Manufacturer: Ford Aerospace
- Launch mass: 1981 kg
- BOL mass: 1098 kg
- Dimensions: 1.66 x 2.1 x 1.77 metres
- Power: 1800 watts

Start of mission
- Launch date: 31 May 1986, 00:53:03 UTC
- Rocket: Ariane 2 V18
- Launch site: Kourou, ELA-1
- Contractor: Aérospatiale
- Entered service: Launch failure

Orbital parameters
- Reference system: Geocentric orbit
- Regime: Geostationary orbit
- Epoch: Planned

Transponders
- Band: 26 C-band; 6 Ku-band

Intelsat VA F-14, was a communications satellite operated by Intelsat. Launched in 1986, it was the fourteenth of fifteen Intelsat V satellites to be launched. The Intelsat V series was constructed by Ford Aerospace, based on the Intelsat VA satellite bus. Intelsat VA F-14 was part of an advanced series of satellites designed to provide greater telecommunications capacity for Intelsat's global network.

== Satellite ==
The satellite was box-shaped, measuring 1.66 by 2.1 by 1.77 metres; solar arrays spanned 15.9 metres tip to tip. The arrays, supplemented by nickel-hydrogen batteries during eclipse, provided 1800 watts of power at mission onset, approximately 1280 watts at the end of its seven-year design life. The payload housed 26 C-band and 6 Ku-band transponders. It could accommodate 15,000 two-way voice circuits and two TV channels simultaneously. It also provided maritime communications for ships at sea.

== Launch ==
The satellite was successfully launched into space on 31 May 1986, at 00:53:03 UTC, by means of an Ariane 2 vehicle from the Centre Spatial Guyanais, Kourou, French Guiana. It had a launch mass of 1981 kg. During the Ariane 2 maiden flight, the third stage had a partial ignition followed by another ignition above nominal pressure which led to the engine's failure and the destruction of the launcher.

== Investigation ==
Because the upper stage of the Ariane 2 was shared with the other Ariane rockets, all flights were suspended until 16 September 1987. As a result of an investigation into the ignition irregularities, it was decided that installing more powerful igniters would sufficiently rectify the issue.
