= PROBA-V =

European Space Agency satellite

- Artist's view of the PROBA-V satellite
- Mission type: Earth observation
- Operator: European Space Agency
- COSPAR ID: 2013-021A
- SATCAT no.: 39159
- Mission duration: 2.5–5 years (planned); 13 years, 5 months and 20 days (elapsed)

Spacecraft properties
- Manufacturer: QinetiQ Space Belgium
- Launch mass: 158 kilograms (348 lb)

Start of mission
- Launch date: 7 May 2013, 02:06:31 UTC
- Rocket: Vega VV02
- Launch site: Kourou ELV
- Contractor: Arianespace

Orbital parameters
- Reference system: Geocentric
- Regime: Sun-synchronous
- Semi-major axis: 7,193.71 kilometres (4,469.96 mi)
- Eccentricity: 0.0004747
- Perigee altitude: 819 kilometres (509 mi)
- Apogee altitude: 826 kilometres (513 mi)
- Inclination: 98.68 degrees
- Period: 101.21 minutes
- Epoch: 25 January 2015, 05:31:39 UTC

PROBA-V, or PROBA-Vegetation (the V standing for vegetation and not the Roman numeral for 5), is a satellite in the European Space Agency's PROBA series. It was launched in 2013 with a predicted usable lifetime between 2.5 and 5 years.

== Satellite ==
PROBA-V is a small satellite, assuring the succession of the Vegetation instruments on board the French SPOT-4 and SPOT-5 Earth observation missions. PROBA-V was initiated by the Space and Aeronautics department of the Belgian Science Policy Office. It is built by QinetiQ Space N.V. and operated by ESA and uses a PROBA platform. PROBA-V will support applications such as land use, worldwide vegetation classification, crop monitoring, famine prediction, food security, disaster monitoring and biosphere studies. The mission was originally conceived as a "gap filler" between the SPOT-5 end-of-life (foreseen mid-2014) and the launch of the constellation of the Sentinel-3A and -3B satellites. Due to delays of the Sentinel programme and because some instrument specifications of the Sentinel-3 satellites have meanwhile changed, PROBA-V no longer is a gap filler mission but will assure the continuation of the Vegetation programme as such. The Vegetation, International User Committee (IUC, an independent body consisting of Vegetation users, that provides user feedback and recommendations to the Vegetation Steering Committee) has recommended to foresee a successor mission for PROBA-V, because the current specifications of the Sentinel-3 satellites no longer allow the continuation of the Vegetation products in the long run. This mission is the first full application mission with a PROBA platform and had a very tight development schedule.

== Development and operations ==
PROBA-V and its onboard instruments have been developed and built by QinetiQ Space N.V and subcontractors for the Directorate of TEChnology (DTEC) of ESA. These developments have been paid with Belgian and Luxembourg contributions to ESA. The In Orbit Commissioning Review (IOCR) was successfully achieved on 27 November 2013. After the launch and the commissioning, PROBA-V was handed over from DTEC to the Earth Observation Directorate of ESA on 12 December 2013. After this handover, the Earth Observation Directorate of ESA will manage the satellite operations, instrument data collection and distribution of the traditional Vegetation products to the users. VITO will actually generate and distribute these products. The management of the new, higher resolution products will be assured by the Space and Aeronautics department of the Belgian Science Policy Office. For these products too, VITO will actually generate and distribute these higher resolution products.

== Onboard instruments ==
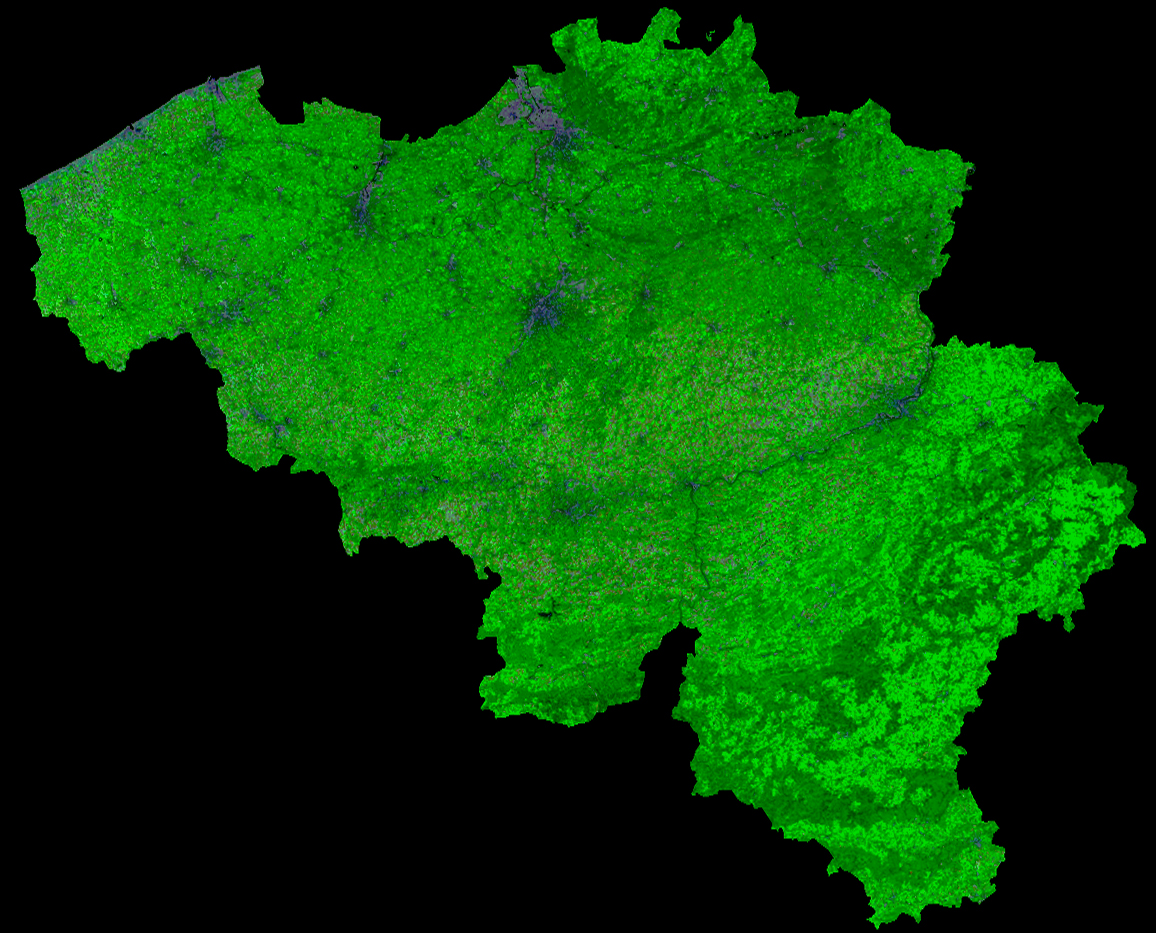
Photo made by PROBA-V in 300 m per pixel resolution of Belgium, showing land cover and vegetation growth

The primary payload of Proba-V is the Vegetation instrument, built by OIP Sensor Systems. This is a reduced-mass version of the Vegetation instrument which was on board the SPOT-4 and -5 satellites to provide a daily overview of global vegetation growth. Traditional Vegetation products generated by these instruments include the 1-day Synthesis products and the 10-day Synthesis products, both with a ground resolution of about 1 km (1 km x 1 km pixel size). Despite the fact that the Vegetation instrument onboard PROBA-V has a higher spatial resolution (smaller groundpixels) than the Vegetation instruments on board the SPOT satellites, the long time series (15 years) of the traditional Vegetation products will be continued by PROBA-V. Thus, PROBA-V will also generate the traditional Vegetation products at approximately 1 km x 1 km ground resolution. The spectral bands (see Electromagnetic spectrum) are nearly identical to the spectral bands of the SPOT Vegetation instruments. Other characteristics of the PROBA-V Vegetation instrument are:

PROBA-V Vegetation instrument	Specification
3 compact, wide field of view, 3-mirror Astigmatic telescope	(3x 34.6°) x 5.5°
Visual and Near InfraRed (VNIR) detectors	3x 5200 pixels, 13 μm
Blue band	447–493 nm
Red band	610–690 nm
Near infrared band	777–893 nm
Ground resolution VNIR	1/3 km
Short Wave InfraRed (SWIR) detector	3x 1024 pixels, butted InGaAs detectors
Short wave infrared band	1570–1650 nm
Ground resolution SWIR	2/3 km

For more detailed specifications and the resulting products that are available to the users, see:

The other, secondary, onboard instruments are:

PROBA-V secondary instruments	Objective
Gallium Nitride based X-band power amplifier	space qualification of new hardware
Energetic particle telescope	record charge, energy and incidence angle of charged particles
Automatic Dependent Surveillance Broadcast (ADS-B) receiver	demonstrate receiving aircraft signals from space, allowing better handling of aircraft emergencies in very remote areas
SATRAM radiation monitoring system	complement to Energetic particle telescope

These secondary instruments are technology demonstrators.

== Launch ==
PROBA-V was launched from ELA-1 at Guiana Space Centre on board Vega flight VV02, on 7 May 2013, together with the Vietnamese VNREDSat 1A satellite, and Estonia's first satellite, ESTCube-1. The launch will mark the first test of the new Vespa dual-payload adapter; PROBA-V will ride in the upper position of the Vespa adapter, and VNREDSat 1A will sit in the lower position. The usable lifetime of PROBA-V highly depends on the local time of the descending node (LTDN). Given that PROBA-V has no onboard propulsion, the natural drift of this LTDN depends on the satellites' in orbit injection accuracy. Based on the injection accuracy specifications of the VEGA launcher, a usable lifetime between 2.5 and 5 years was predicted. The achieved in orbit injection accuracy is such that the LTDN will be out of the specifications after 5 years.

== Data policy ==
The data policy for the traditional Vegetation products, as provided by the SPOT-Vegetation instruments, was not freely accessible for all users, meaning that for some products, the user had to pay a fee. Only the products older than 3 months were for free for everybody and were delivered on a best effort basis. The data policy of the traditional Vegetation products, as provided by PROBA-V, will be freely accessible for all users. This, so called full, free and open data policy, was approved by the Programme Board for Earth Observation (PBEO) of ESA on 25 September 2013. The new, higher resolution products of PROBA-V that are older than 1 month, have the same full, free and open data policy. Depending on the kind of user (scientific, commercial, ...) and the kind of higher resolution product (customised or not, guaranteed in time delivery or not, ...) a fee has to be paid for certain other, higher resolution products of PROBA-V.

== Outreach ==
On 18 March 2019, Bpost released a souvenir sheet of 5 stamps honouring Belgian space activities, among which PROBA-V's own stamp representing the country's contribution in Earth observation.

== See also ==
- List of European Space Agency programs and missions
- PROBA
- PROBA-2
- PROBA-3
