= TRITON =

Taiwanese weather satellite

- Mission type: Weather satellite
- Operator: Taiwan Space Agency
- COSPAR ID: 2023-155B
- SATCAT no.: 58017

Spacecraft properties
- Manufacturer: Surrey Satellite Technology; Taiwan Space Agency
- Launch mass: About 250 kg (551 lb)
- Dimensions: 100 cm × 120 cm × 125 cm

Start of mission
- Launch date: 9 October 2023, 1:36 UTC
- Rocket: Vega
- Launch site: Guiana Space Center

TRITON, or originally called FORMOSAT-7R, is a Taiwanese weather satellite. It can collect sea surface data to derive wind speed using a GNSS reflectometry sensor. The English name TRITON comes from the Greek mythology messenger of the sea, Triton.

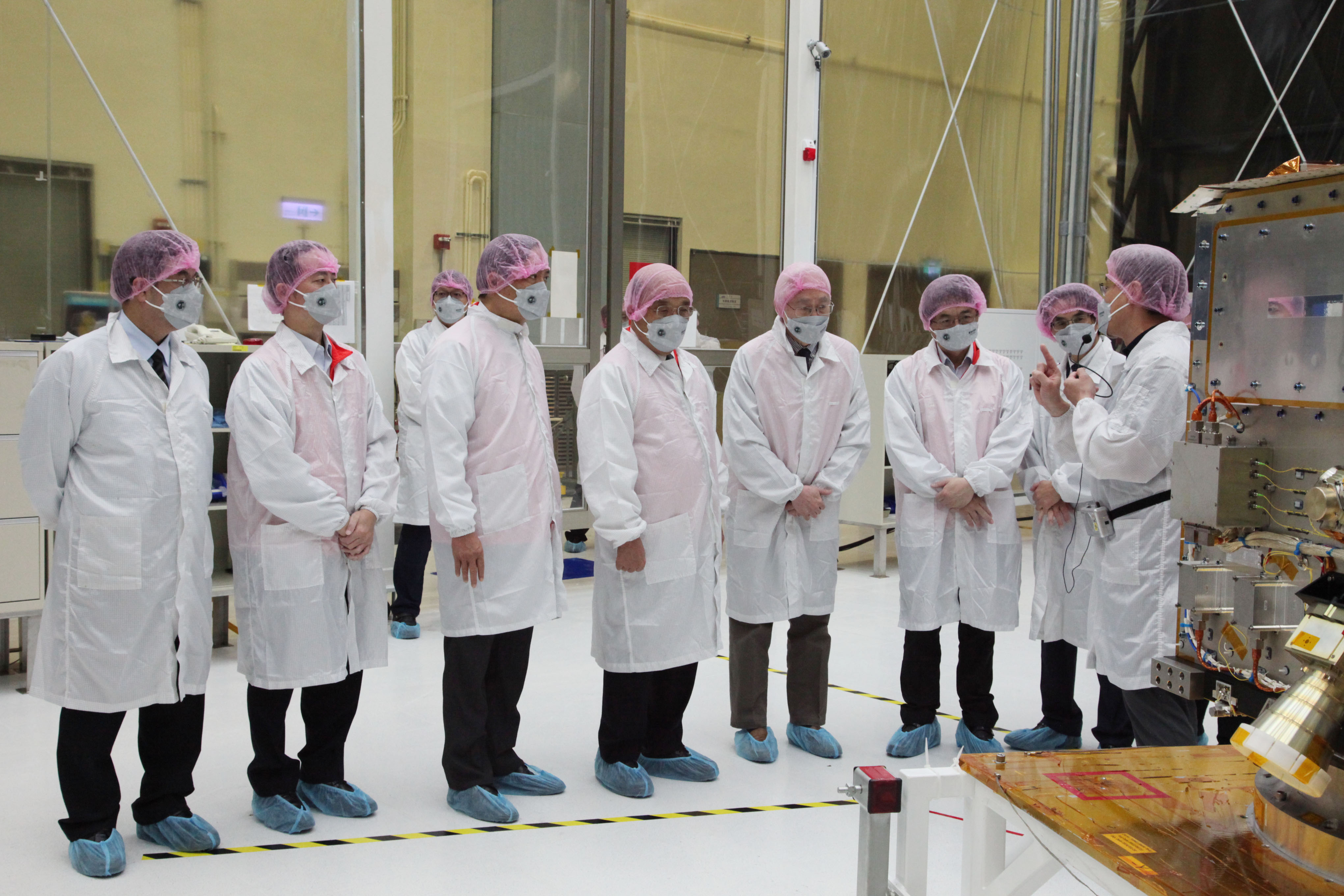
TRITON satellite Taiwan Space Agency team taking a photo beside the satellite

== History ==
The TRITON satellite was originally the FORMOSAT-7R, which was intended to be the indigenous node out of the planned 13 satellites of the constellation FORMOSAT-7. The constellation was later scaled down to one TRITON satellite plus six FORMOSAT-7 satellites. The satellite boasts an 83% domestic production rate, with key contributions from Taiwanese companies. Aerospace Industrial Development Corporation (AIDC) was responsible for the satellite's integration, with components supplied by companies such as Fongshen Technology and the Syscom Computer.

Notably, information regarding the satellite's manufacture can be found on the official website of Surrey Satellite Technology Ltd. (SSTL), the company that constructed the FORMOSAT-7 satellites.

The satellite's launch was initially scheduled for early 2023. However, it was postponed due to the inaugural commercial launch failure of the Vega C rocket, on which TRITON was slated to be a payload.

On July 14, 2023, the TRITON satellite was transported from the Taiwan Space Agency (formerly the National Space Organization) to the airport for its journey to the Guiana Space Centre. The launch was scheduled for October 5 at 9:36 AM Taiwan time.

However, on October 5, Arianespace, the launch service provider, announced a delay, citing the need for additional time for rocket preparation and testing. The launch was rescheduled to October 7 at 9:36 AM Taiwan time.

On the rescheduled date of October 7, the launch was aborted just 14 seconds before liftoff due to a signal anomaly, necessitating a further postponement. The mission was successfully restarted on October 9, with the satellite lifting off and entering its designated orbit at approximately 10:00 AM on the same day.
