= Astrosat-1000 =

Satellite bus manufactured by EADS Astrium

Astrosat-1000 is the largest option in EADS Astrium's Astrosat family of satellite buses. Astrosat-1000 provides the basic structure for building satellites between 800 and 1200 kg in mass. It is the satellite bus used for the Pléiades-HR series of satellites.
