= CAT-1 =

European Space Agency artificial satellite

- Mission type: Vehicle evaluation
- Operator: ESA
- COSPAR ID: 1979-104A
- SATCAT no.: 11645
- Mission duration: 8 orbits

Spacecraft properties
- Launch mass: 1,602 kilograms (3,532 lb)

Start of mission
- Launch date: December 24, 1979, 17:14:38 UTC
- Rocket: Ariane 1
- Launch site: Kourou ELA-1

End of mission
- Last contact: 28 December 1979
- Decay date: 27 November 1989

Orbital parameters
- Reference system: Geocentric
- Regime: Geostationary transfer
- Perigee altitude: 182 kilometres (113 mi)
- Apogee altitude: 35,824 kilometres (22,260 mi)
- Inclination: 17.6 degrees
- Period: 631.45 minutes
- Epoch: 23 January 1980

CAT-1 (also Technological Capsule 1, also Obélix) was the first artificial Earth satellite launched by the European Space Agency on their own rocket, the Ariane 1. It was only intended to provide data on the launch characteristics of the new rocket and was only powered for 8 orbits.

== See also ==
- List of European Space Agency programmes and missions
- YPSat-1
