= YPSat-1 =

Payload monitoring the first flight of the Ariane 6 rocket

- Mission type: Flight monitoring
- Operator: European Space Agency

Start of mission
- Launch date: 9 July 2024
- Rocket: Ariane 6
- Young Professionals Satellite Programme

YPSat-1 was a payload launched on the inaugural flight of the European rocket Ariane 6 in July 2024 in order to monitor the rocket's flight and operations with cameras and a magnetic field sensor.

== History ==
YPSat-1 was developed as a volunteer project by a group of young professionals from the European Space Agency (ESA), and so its purpose was not only technological but also educational. The instrument, designed to stay attached to the rocket's second stage, successfully recorded images and videos from key phases of the flight, including fairing separation and deployment of satellites, and transmitted them to Earth. ESA is developing a similar project YPSat-2 for the first flight of its uncrewed spaceplane Space Rider in 2027.

== See also ==
- List of European Space Agency programmes and missions
- CAT-1
