= SEOSat-Ingenio =

2020 failed Spanish satellite project

- Mission type: Earth observation Optical imaging Disaster monitoring
- Operator: hisdeSAT
- Mission duration: 7 years (planned)

Spacecraft properties
- Bus: AstroBus-L
- Manufacturer: Airbus Defence and Space; Thales Alenia Space
- Launch mass: 830 kg
- Dry mass: 750 kg
- Power: 580 watts

Start of mission
- Launch date: 17 November 2020, 01:52:20 UTC
- Rocket: Vega VV17
- Launch site: Centre Spatial Guyanais, ELV
- Contractor: Arianespace

End of mission
- Last contact: November 17, 2020 UTC
- Decay date: Launch failure, did not achieve orbit Cause: Human Error

Orbital parameters
- Reference system: Geocentric orbit
- Regime: Sun-synchronous orbit
- Altitude: 670 km
- Inclination: 98.09°

SEOSat-Ingenio (short for Spanish Earth Observation Satellite-Ingenio), was a Spanish project to produce a satellite capable of providing wide-field imagery (230 frames a day, 60 km × 60 km) ensuring a repeat cycle of 38 days at 2.5 metre panchromatic resolution and 10 metre colour resolution, from a Sun-synchronous polar orbit; it was Spain's first optical imaging satellite. The satellite was part of the Spanish Earth Observation Satellite program. The mission was funded by Spain's Centre for the Development of Industrial Technology (CDTI). SEOSat-Ingenio information was to be used by various Spanish civil, institutional or government users. However, under the Copernicus Programme of the European Union, it was also accessible to other European users, as well as to the Group on Earth observation of the Global Observing System of Earth.

== Overview ==
The prime contractor was Airbus Defence and Space, Spain and some parts of the satellite was built by Thales Alenia Space. Spacecraft construction was completed in 2019. The primary payload was a pushbroom imager composed of a Multispectral Imager and a Panchromatic Imager.

Three Complementary Scientific Payloads were initially scheduled to be on board: SENSOSOL, The Two Towers (TTT) and Ultraviolet and Visible Atmospheric Sounder (UVAS). However, in July 2019, Airbus and CDTI confirmed that both TTT and UVAS instruments had lost their flight opportunity.

It was originally projected to launch in 2017; launch vehicle candidates included Vega, Rockot, and PSLV. On 17 May 2019, ESA and Arianespace signed a contract to launch SEOSat-Ingenio on a Vega rocket (VV17) from Centre Spatial Guyanais in 2020.

== Spacecraft ==
The first test images of SEOSat-Ingenio were to be downlinked within two to three weeks of launch. The satellite was to be fully operational by April 2021. The SEOSat-Ingenio project cost around 200 million euros, or US$236 million.

Another goal of the SEOSat-Ingenio project, which Spain's government kicked off in 2007, was to foster a growing Spanish space industry. About 80% of the spacecraft was manufactured in Spain, while previous Spanish government satellites were only about half-manufactured in Spain.

== Launch failure ==
SEOSat-Ingenio was launched from the Centre Spatial Guyanais at 01:52:20 UTC on 17 November 2020 alongside the TARANIS satellite. The flight was planned to deploy the satellites into 2 very slightly different Sun-synchronous orbits at roughly 670 km (starting 54 minutes until 102 minutes after liftoff), before the upper stage would have re-ignited to re-enter the Earth's atmosphere. However, the rocket failed after launch and the mission was lost. The exact cause was the first ignition of the engine of the Avum fourth stage, a deviation of trajectory was identified, entailing the loss of the mission. Arianespace traces cause of Vega launch failure to "human error". This was the Vega rocket's second failure in seventeen missions.
