= Vega flight VV15 =

Space launch

- Artwork featured on visitors' brochures

Vega launch
- Launch: 11 July 2019, 01:53:03 UTC
- Operator: Arianespace
- Pad: Centre Spatial Guyanais, ELV
- Payload: FalconEye1
- Outcome: Failure

Vega launches

Vega flight VV15 was the 15th flight of the Vega launcher, and its first failure.

== Payload ==
The flight, with a total payload mass of about 1,279 kg (2,820 lb), was a single-payload mission that should have deployed the FalconEye1 satellite into orbit.

=== FalconEye1 ===
FalconEye1, a high resolution Earth observation satellite built by Airbus Defence and Space and Thales Alenia Space, for the United Arab Emirates Armed Forces (UAEAF), had a lift-off mass of approximately 1,197 kg (2,639 lb), and was the only satellite on board the flight.

== Mission description ==
=== Launch date ===
The launch, initially planned for 5 June 2019, was postponed several times due to unfavourable weather conditions. The 15th Vega flight finally lifted off from the ELV launch pad in Kourou, French Guiana on 11 July 2019 at 01:53:03 UTC (10 July 2019 at 22:53:03 local time).

=== Planned orbit ===
Arianespace detailed presentation of planned orbit

The mission was planned to last 57 minutes and 09 seconds from lift-off until separation, placing its payload into a quasi-circular Sun-synchronous target orbit with a mean altitude of about 611 km (380 mi).

=== Launch log ===
It was the 311th Arianespace mission (the sixth in 2019), and the 15th Vega launch (the 2nd in 2019).

FalconEye1 was Airbus Defence and Space's 131st and Thales Alenia Space 159th spacecraft to be launched by Arianespace.

== Failure ==
=== Initial statements ===
Only 9 minutes after liftoff, a first statement was read by Luce Fabreguettes, Arianespace's executive vice-president for missions, operations and purchasing:

Ladies and gentlemen, as you have seen, about 2 minutes after liftoff, around the Zefiro 23 (Z23) ignition, a major anomaly occurred, resulting in the loss of the mission. On behalf of Arianespace, I wish to express my deepest apologies to our customers for the loss of their payload, and telling them how sorry I am. From the first flight data analysis we will get in the coming hours more precise information, and we will communicate to everybody at the soonest. Again let me present my deepest apologies to our customers. Thank you.

Arianespace later repeated in a press release that "approximately two minutes after the Vega launcher's liftoff, shortly after ignition of the second stage (Z23), a launcher anomaly occurred – leading to the premature end of the mission".

Avio also published the same press release and also a video by their CEO confirming the event: "Approximately two minutes after the Vega launcher's liftoff, shortly after ignition of the second stage, a launcher anomaly occurred – leading to the premature end of the mission", and "At present, the cause of the anomaly is still unknown and is under investigation".

=== Inquiry commission ===
On the day of the incident, Arianespace and ESA announced that an inquiry commission would be appointed to investigate the causes of the failure and to produce recommendations allowing the Vega launcher to resume safe operations. It has been co-chaired by ESA's inspector general, Toni Tolker-Nielsen, and Arianespace's chief technical officer, Roland Lagier, and also included representatives from CNES and Avio.

On 4 September 2019, the inquiry commission submitted its findings, that were released the next day on 5 September 2019. In particular, a structural failure on the second stage's forward dome area resulting from higher temperatures was identified as the most probable cause of the failure:

The Commission identified as the most likely cause of the anomaly a thermo-structural failure in the forward dome area of the Z23 motor. Other possible causes such as inadvertent activation of the Z23 neutralization system have been found unlikely.

On 6 December 2019, Avio released its further findings, revealing that a thermal protection design flaw on the second stage's forward dome area was the root cause of this launch failure that allowed a hot gas leaking into the critical structural part of the forward dome area. Avio engineers were able to replicate the same failure mode with this launch failure. The issue was addressed though adding more thermal protection and taking other measures.

=== Aftermath ===
A set of corrective actions will be implemented by the rocket manufacturer to fix and reinforce the suspected part to prevent the repeat of the failure. Arianespace expected to resume Vega flight by late March 2020, almost nine months of hiatus. The maiden flight of upgraded Vega C would be in the second quarter of 2020.

But the return-to-flight was delayed several times. In June 2020, after being delayed from March 2020 due to COVID-19 pandemic, the launch was delayed again to mid-August 2020 due to unfavorable weather conditions and the need to recharge the satellites' batteries as the launch window in June had exhausted, making another launch campaign in the Guiana Space Centre, Ariane flight VA253, preceded this return-to-flight. Delayed again to 1 and then 2 September due to range conflict with delayed launch of VA253 resulting from a sensor problem on the Ariane 5 rocket. Delayed again by 24 hours due to Typhoon Maysak approaching the Jeju tracking station that was intended to acquire the rocket's telemetry. Finally, the return-to-flight was performed successfully on 3 September 2020 at the instantaneous launch window at 01:51:10 UTC, almost 14 months of hiatus. As a result, from the long delay, the maiden flight of upgraded Vega C would be the first half of 2021.

UAE Armed Forces announced the cancellation of subsequent FalconEye 2 satellite to be launched on a Vega rocket and ordered Arianespace to switch to a more expensive Soyuz rocket.

The failed launch of Falcon Eye 1 led to the highest recorded amount for a single insurance claim in history ($415 million) for a satellite launch failure.
