= Ariane 2 =

European medium-lift space launch vehicle (1986–1989)

- Function: Medium-lift launch vehicle
- Manufacturer: Aérospatiale for ESA and Arianespace

Size
- Height: 49.13 m (161.2 ft)
- Diameter: 3.8 m (12 ft)
- Mass: 215,000 kg (474,000 lb)
- Stages: 3

Capacity

Payload to GTO
- Mass: 2,175 kg (4,795 lb)

Associated rockets
- Family: Ariane

Launch history
- Status: Retired
- Launch sites: Guiana Space Centre ELA-1
- Total launches: 6
- Success(es): 5
- Failure: 1
- First flight: 31 May 1986
- Last flight: 2 April 1989
- Carries passengers or cargo: Tele-X TV-SAT 1

First stage – L-140
- Height: 19.09 m (62.6 ft)
- Diameter: 3.80 m (12.5 ft)
- Gross mass: 165.89 tonnes (182.86 tons)
- Powered by: Viking 5B
- Maximum thrust: 2,580 kN (580,000 lb_{f})
- Specific impulse: 2,376 N‑s/kg (242.3 s)
- Burn time: 138 s
- Propellant: UH 25 / N_{2}O_{4}

Second stage – L-33
- Height: 11.47 m (37.6 ft)
- Diameter: 2.60 m (8 ft 6 in)
- Gross mass: 39.41 tonnes (43.44 tons)
- Powered by: Viking 4B
- Maximum thrust: 784.8 kN (176,400 lb_{f}) (vacuum)
- Specific impulse: 2,851 N‑s/kg (290.7 s)
- Burn time: 128.9 s
- Propellant: UH 25 / N_{2}O_{4}

Third stage – H-10
- Height: 9.89 m (32.4 ft)
- Diameter: 2.60 m (8 ft 6 in)
- Gross mass: 12.74 tonnes (14.04 tons)
- Powered by: HM7B
- Maximum thrust: 64.2 kN (14,400 lb_{f})
- Specific impulse: 4,336 N‑s/kg (442.1 s)
- Burn time: 729 s
- Propellant: LH_{2} / LOX

Ariane 2 was a European expendable space launch vehicle, operated by the European Space Agency (ESA) between 1986 and 1989 as part of Ariane family of rockets. The principal manufacturer for the Ariane 2 was Aérospatiale, while the lead agency for its development was the Centre National d'Etudes Spatiales (CNES), the French government's space agency.

Development of the Ariane 2 was authorised in July 1979, months prior to the Ariane 1's first flight. Drawing heavily upon both the design and infrastructure of the Ariane 1, the new launcher was concurrently developed alongside the Ariane 3, with which it shared much of its design. It represented an advancement of the Ariane 1 rather than a replacement, but was capable of lifting even heavier payloads into geostationary transfer orbit (GTO). Developed largely within a two-year window, the Ariane 2 performed its maiden flight on 31 May 1986, actually flying after its Ariane 3 sibling. During its brief service life, the final launch of the Ariane 2 having been conducted on 2 April 1989, the Ariane family had become increasingly commercially competitive, becoming the market leading heavy launch vehicle in the world by the late 1980s.

== Development ==
In 1973, eleven nations decided to pursue a joint collaboration in the field of space exploration and formed a new pan-national organisation to undertake this mission, the European Space Agency. Six years later, in December 1979, the arrival of a capable European expendable launch system was marked when the first Ariane 1 launcher was successfully launched from the Guiana Space Centre at Kourou, French Guiana. The Ariane 1 soon became considered to be a capable and competitive launcher in comparison to rival platforms offered by the Soviet Union and the United States. However, even prior to the launcher entering service, there was a strong desire to quickly produce improved derivatives that would be able to handle even greater payloads than Ariane 1 could. These desires would result in the creation of both the Ariane 2 and Ariane 3.

While the initiative was first proposed in 1978, prior to the Ariane 1's first flight, approval to commence the first phase of development was not received until July 1979. The bulk of development work on the new launcher occurred between 1980 and 1982. The Ariane 2 was designed to satisfy the future demand for the delivery of two tonne payloads into a Geosynchronous transfer orbit (GTO). According to aerospace historian Brian Harvey, in spite of the numbering sequence adopted, the Ariane 3 was the direct successor to the Ariane 1, rather than the Ariane 2, as could be logically assumed. The principal agency behind the development of the Ariane 2 was the Centre National d'Etudes Spatiales (CNES), while the lead company for its production was the French aerospace manufacturer Aérospatiale.

In order to keep costs down, CNES directed that only tested technologies could be implemented in the launcher's improvements; in fact, no budget was provided for new test series to be performed. Furthermore, it was restricted to using the existing launch pad and handling facilities established for the Ariane 1, and that there was to be no allowance for retooling of the Ariane production line. However, one new piece of infrastructure that was permitted was the establishment of tracking equipment in the Ivory Coast; the existing infrastructure based in Brazil used by the Ariane 1 was less suitable due to the increased performance of the Ariane 2, which flew a different ascent profile than its predecessor. Performance boosts were achieved via several different ways, such as the elongated third stage fuel tanks to carry 30 per cent more fuel, elevated combustion pressure in multiple stages, a new intertank structure that supported the addition of solid-fuel boosters, and the adoption of a new fuel mixture.

The finalised Ariane 2 is largely identical to its sibling, the Ariane 3, the only major difference being the lack of additional solid rocket boosters, which gave the Ariane 3 a higher payload capacity at a greater unit cost. The payload capacity of the Ariane 2 was 2,175 kilograms (4,795 lb) to a geosynchronous transfer orbit (GTO), exceeding that of the preceding Ariane 1.

== Launch history ==
The Ariane 2 first flew on 31 May 1986, during which it carried the Intelsat VA F-14 satellite. However, the third stage had a partial ignition followed by another ignition above nominal pressure which led to the engine's failure. Because the upper stage of the Ariane 2 was shared with the other Ariane rockets, all flights were suspended until 16 September 1987. As a result of an investigation into the ignition irregularities, it was decided that installing more powerful igniters would sufficiently rectify the issue. Despite this incident, the reliability of the Ariane family meant that insurance costs for the launcher decreased until they were less than that of rival American launchers. Throughout the 1980s, the platform became increasingly competitive on the global stage.

Following its reintroduction, five further launches of the Ariane 2 were conducted, all of which were successful. The last Ariane 2 launch occurred on 2 April 1989, successfully placing Tele-X into orbit. According to Harvey, the Ariane family had become the dominant series of launchers on the world market as early as 1986. Even prior to the maiden flight of the Ariane 2, the family had been able to secure the majority of the global launcher market. Despite its relative success, the Ariane 2 was quickly replaced by the even more capable Ariane 4, which had resulted in the launcher only conducting a comparatively small number of launches.
