= Ensemble de Lancement Vega =

Launch pad at the Guiana Space Centre

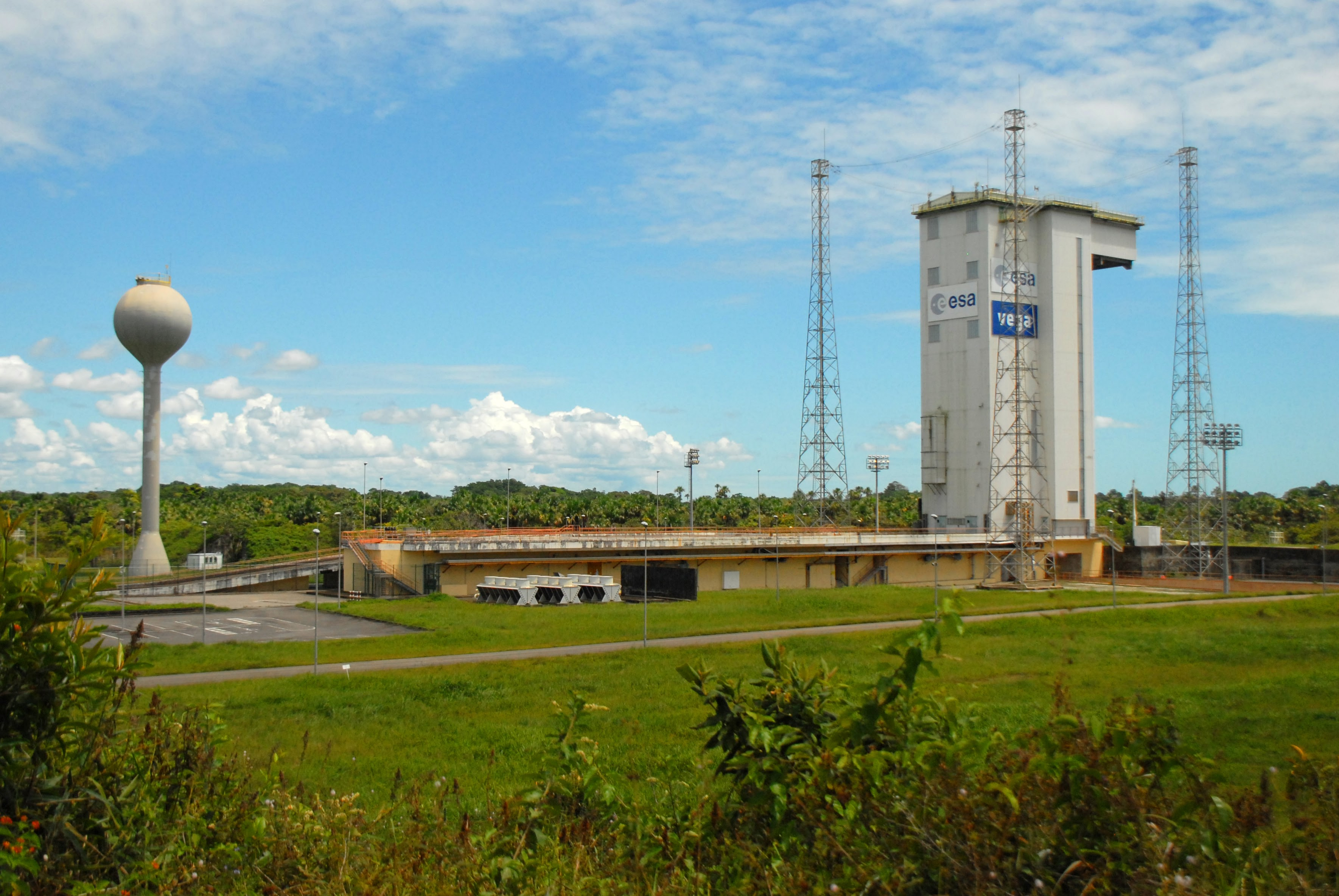
- ELV launch pad in 2017
- Interactive map of Ensemble de Lancement Vega
- Launch site: Guiana Space Centre
- Location: 5°14′10″N 52°46′30″W
- Time zone: UTC−03 (GFT)
- Short name: ELV
- Operator: Avio · ESA
- Total launches: 56: 1 Europa II; 11 Ariane 1; 5 Ariane 2; 9 Ariane 3; 22 Vega; 8 Vega C
Launch history
- Status: Active
- First launch: 5 November 1971; Europa II (STV-4)
- Last launch: 15 September 2026; Vega C (Sentinel-3C & FLEX)
- Associated rockets: Active: Vega C Retired: Europa II, Ariane 1, Ariane 2, Ariane 3, Vega

Launch pads at the Guiana Space Centre
Active pad
Inactive tenanted pad
Inactive untenanted pad
1 ELFS
2 ELM
3 ELV
4 ELA-2
5 ELA-3
6 ELA-4
7 ELS

Ensemble de Lancement Vega (ELV, lit. 'Vega Launch Complex') is a launch complex at the Guiana Space Centre in French Guiana supporting launches of the Vega and Vega C rockets. It was first built in November 1971 and was previously used to support launches of the Europa, Ariane 1 and Ariane 3 rockets.

== History ==
=== Europa (BEC) ===
ELA-1, at the time designated BEC (French: Base Équatoriale du CECLES, lit. 'CECLES Equatorial Base') was constructed as an equatorial launch site for the Europa-II rocket which was being built as part of the ELDO programme. The first launch occurred on 5 November 1971. This was the only flight of the Europa-II, which ended in failure due to a guidance problem. The launch site was mothballed, and later demolished.

=== Ariane (ELA) ===
When the Ariane 1 programme was started, to replace the failed ELDO programme, a new launch site was built on the site of the former BEC, re-designated as ELA (French: Ensemble de Ariane, lit. 'Ariane Launch Complex'). The first Ariane 1 launch occurred on 24 December 1979. ELA was also used by Ariane 2 and Ariane 3 rockets, which first flew on 31 May 1986 and 4 August 1984 respectively. ELA was redesignated ELA-1 when the Ariane 4 entered service in 1988, as this launched from a separate launch pad, designated ELA-2. The Ariane 1 was retired on 22 February 1986, the Ariane 2 on 2 April 1989, and the Ariane 3 on 12 July 1989. ELA was subsequently demolished.

=== Vega (ELV) ===
In November 2001, started the redevelopment of the pad to accommodate the Vega rocket and the ELA-1 was redesignated ELV. The reconstruction retained the Ariane 1 flame trench and added a new 50 m tall retractable vertical assembly building to cover the rocket during the preparation, four lighting protection masts and a new launch tower for the rocket. The launchpad is sometimes also designated as Site de Lancement Vega (SLV) and Zone de Lancement Vega (ZLV). Vega made its first launch from the complex on 13 February 2012.

== Launch history ==
- Europa II
- Ariane 1
- Ariane 2
- Ariane 3
- Vega
- Vega C

=== As BEC and ELA-1 ===
| No. | Date | Time (UTC) | Launch vehicle | Payload | Result | Remarks |
|---|---|---|---|---|---|---|
| 1 | 5 November 1971 | 13:00 | Europa II | Boilerplate payload | Failure | Only launch of the Europa II. Reverse of guidance signals caused third stage failure. First orbital launch attempt from Kourou. |
| 2 | 24 December 1979 | 17:14 | Ariane 1 | CAT-1 | Success | Demonstration satellite to test the launch vehicle. Maiden flight of Ariane 1 and of the Ariane family. First successful launch from ELA-1. |
| 3 | 23 May 1980 | 14:29 | Ariane 1 | CAT-2 and secondary payloads | Failure | Combustion instability led to first stage failure and loss of vehicle during launch. |
| 4 | 19 June 1981 | 12:32 | Ariane 1 | CAT-3 and secondary payloads | Success | |
| 5 | 20 December 1981 | 01:29 | Ariane 1 | CAT-4 and MARECS 1 | Success | |
| 6 | 9 September 1982 | 02:12 | Ariane 1 | MARECS B and Sirio 2 | Failure | Third stage encountered turbopump failure, leading to loss of vehicle. |
| 7 | 16 June 1983 | 11:59 | Ariane 1 | Eutelsat 1 and Oscar 10 | Success | |
| 8 | 19 October 1983 | 00:45 | Ariane 1 | Intelsat 507 | Success | |
| 9 | 5 March 1984 | 00:50 | Ariane 1 | Intelsat 508 | Success | |
| 10 | 23 May 1984 | 01:33 | Ariane 1 | Spacenet F1 | Success | |
| 11 | 4 August 1984 | 13:32 | Ariane 3 | Eutelsat 2 and Telecom 1A | Success | Maiden flight of the Ariane 3. |
| 12 | 10 November 1984 | 01:14 | Ariane 3 | Spacenet F2 and MARECS 2 | Success | |
| 13 | 8 February 1985 | 23:22 | Ariane 3 | Arabsat-1A and Brasilsat-A1 | Success | |
| 14 | 8 May 1985 | 01:15 | Ariane 3 | GStar 1 and Télécom 1B | Success | |
| 15 | 2 July 1985 | 11:23 | Ariane 1 | Giotto | Success | Part of the Halley Armada, tasked with exploring comet 1P/Halley during its 1986 apparition and later explored 26P/Grigg–Skjellerup. First launch from Kourou to go to heliocentric orbit and first ESA spacecraft to visit another celestial body. |
| 16 | 12 September 1985 | 23:26 | Ariane 3 | Spacenet 3 and Eutelsat 3 | Failure | Burn into geostationary transfer orbit failed, stranding payloads in low Earth orbit. |
| 17 | 22 February 1986 | 01:44 | Ariane 1 | SPOT 1 and Viking | Success | First satellite operated by Sweden for Viking. Final launch of Ariane 1. |
| 18 | 31 May 1986 | 00:53 | Ariane 2 | Intelsat VA F-14 | Failure | Maiden flight of Ariane 2. Third stage failed to ignite. |
| 19 | 16 September 1987 | 00:45 | Ariane 3 | Aussat A3 and Eutelsat 1F4 | Success | |
| 20 | 11 March 1988 | 23:28 | Ariane 3 | Spacenet 3R and Telecom 1C | Success | |
| 21 | 17 May 1988 | 23:58 | Ariane 2 | Intelsat VA F-13 | Success | |
| 22 | 21 July 1988 | 23:12 | Ariane 3 | Insat 1C and Eutelsat 1F5 | Success | |
| 23 | 28 October 1988 | 02:17 | Ariane 2 | TDF-1 | Success | |
| 24 | 27 January 1989 | 01:21 | Ariane 2 | Intelsat VA F-15 | Success | |
| 25 | 2 April 1989 | 02:28 | Ariane 2 | Tele-X | Success | Final launch of Ariane 2. |
| 26 | 11 July 1989 | 00:14 | Ariane 3 | Olympus-1 | Success | Final launch of Ariane 3 and most recent Ariane flight from ELA-1, with subsequent Ariane launches being performed at ELA-2, ELA-3, and ELA-4. Final launch from ELA-1 prior to conversion into ELV. |

=== As ELV ===
| No. | Date | Time (UTC) | Launch vehicle | Payload | Result | Remarks |
|---|---|---|---|---|---|---|
| 27 | 13 February 2012 | 10:00 | Vega | Various payloads | Success | Maiden flight of Vega and first launch from ELV following Ariane 2 and 3's retirement. First non-Ariane orbital launch from Kourou since Europa II in 1971. |
| 28 | 7 May 2013 | 02:06 | Vega | PROBA-V, VNREDSat 1A, and ESTCube-1 | Success | |
| 29 | 30 April 2014 | 01:35 | Vega | KazEOSat 1 | Success | |
| 30 | 11 February 2015 | 13:40 | Vega | Intermediate eXperimental Vehicle | Success | Semi-suborbital launch. Test flight of a lifting body vehicle at reentry speeds. Test launch as part of the Future Launchers Preparatory Programme. |
| 31 | 23 June 2015 | 01:51 | Vega | Sentinel-2A | Success | Part of the Copernicus Programme series of earth observation satellites. First Sentinel launch on Vega and from ELV. |
| 32 | 3 December 2015 | 04:04 | Vega | LISA Pathfinder | Success | Part of the Horizon 2000 Plus program, aiming to test technologies needed for future use by the Laser Interferometer Space Antenna mission. First Vega launch to go beyond low Earth orbit. |
| 33 | 16 September 2016 | 01:43 | Vega | PeruSat-1 and Terra Bella | Success | |
| 34 | 5 December 2016 | 13:51 | Vega | Göktürk-1A | Success | |
| 35 | 7 March 2017 | 01:49 | Vega | Sentinel-2B | Success | Part of the Copernicus Programme series of earth observation satellites. |
| 36 | 2 August 2017 | 01:58 | Vega | OPTSAT-3000 and VENμS | Success | |
| 37 | 8 November 2017 | 01:42 | Vega | Mohammed VI-A | Success | |
| 38 | 22 August 2018 | 21:20 | Vega | ADM-Aeolus | Success | |
| 39 | 21 November 2018 | 01:42 | Vega | Mohammed VI-B | Success | |
| 40 | 22 March 2019 | 01:50 | Vega | PRISMA | Success | |
| 41 | 11 July 2019 | 01:53 | Vega | Falcon Eye 1 | Failure | Flaw in thermal protection caused second stage failure, leading to loss of vehicle and payload. |
| 42 | 3 September 2020 | 01:51 | Vega | SSMS PoC Flight | Success | |
| 43 | 17 November 2020 | 01:52 | Vega | SEOSat-Ingenio and TARANIS | Failure | Fourth stage caused deviation in trajectory, leading to failure of placing satellites in orbit. |
| 44 | 29 April 2021 | 01:50 | Vega | Pléiades Neo 3 and others | Success | |
| 45 | 17 August 2021 | 01:47 | Vega | Pléiades Neo 4 and others | Success | |
| 46 | 16 November 2021 | 09:27 | Vega | CERES 1/2/3 | Success | |
| 47 | 13 July 2022 | 13:13 | Vega C | LARES 2 and others | Success | Maiden flight of Vega C. |
| 48 | 21 December 2022 | 01:47 | Vega C | Pléiades Neo 5 & 6 | Failure | Loss of pressure in second stage resulted in loss of launch vehicle and payload. |
| 49 | 9 October 2023 | 01:36 | Vega | THEOS-2 and others | Success | |
| 50 | 5 September 2024 | 01:50 | Vega | Sentinel-2C | Success | Part of the Copernicus Programme series of earth observation satellites. Final launch of the original Vega launch vehicle. |
| 51 | 5 December 2024 | 21:20 | Vega C | Sentinel-1C | Success | Part of the Copernicus Programme series of earth observation satellites. First Vega C launch following the failure of VV22. |
| 52 | 29 April 2025 | 09:15 | Vega C | BIOMASS | Success | Part of the Living Planet Programme, aimed at measuring the biomass of forests across the planet. |
| 53 | 26 July 2025 | 02:03 | Vega C | CO3D and MicroCarb | Success | |
| 54 | 1 December 2025 | 17:21 | Vega C | KOMPSAT-7 | Success | |
| 55 | 19 May 2026 | 03:52 | Vega C | SMILE | Success | Part of the Cosmic Vision Programme, designed to study Earth's magnetosphere. Joint mission between ESA and the Chinese Academy of Sciences. |
| 56 | 15 September 2026 | 01:21 | Vega C | Sentinel-3C and FLEX | Success | Part of the Copernicus Programme series of earth observation satellites for Sentinel-3C. Part of the FutureEO programme for FLEX, designed to study chlorophyll fluorescence from orbit. |

==== Upcoming launches ====
| Date | Launch vehicle | Payload |
|---|---|---|
| December 2026 | Vega C | IRIDE Mission 1 |

== See also ==
- Ariane 1
- Ariane 2
- Ariane 3
- Ariane (rocket family)
- Europa
- Vega
- ELA-2
- Centre Spatial Guyanais
