= TARANIS =

Earth observation satellite

- Mission type: Magnetosphere, ionosphere and atmosphere studies
- Operator: Centre national d'études spatiales (CNES)
- Website: https://taranis.cnes.fr
- Mission duration: 4 years (planned)

Spacecraft properties
- Bus: Myriade
- Manufacturer: Centre national d'études spatiales (CNES)
- Launch mass: 175 kg
- Power: 85 watts

Start of mission
- Launch date: 17 November 2020, 01:52:20 UTC
- Rocket: Vega VV17
- Launch site: Centre Spatial Guyanais, ELV
- Contractor: Avio, Italy

End of mission
- Decay date: Launch failure (4th stage); Cause: human error Last contact: November 17, 2020; Did not achieve orbit, so decay was imminent

Orbital parameters
- Reference system: Geocentric orbit
- Regime: Sun-synchronous orbit
- Altitude: 676.0 km
- Inclination: 98.19°

TARANIS (Tool for the Analysis of Radiation from lightning and Sprites) was an observation satellite of the French Space Agency (CNES) which would have studied the transient events produced in the Earth's atmospheric layer between 10 km (6.2 mi) and 100 km (62 mi) altitude. TARANIS was launched in November 2020 with SEOSat-Ingenio aboard Vega flight VV17 and would have been placed in a Sun-synchronous orbit at an altitude of 676 km, for a mission duration of two to four years, but the rocket failed shortly after launch.

== Science objectives ==
The satellite was intended to collect data on transient events that are observed during thunderstorms. These events happen between the medium and upper atmosphere, the ionosphere and the magnetosphere (radiation belts). The resulting phenomena in visible light are called Transient Luminous Events (TLE) and take a great diversity of forms sprites, blue jets, red giants, halos, elves, varying in color, shape and duration, and relations between them. Thunderstorms are also known to generate gamma and X-ray photon emissions called Terrestrial Gamma-ray Flashes (TGF), generated by intense electric fields in which the electrons are accelerated to the point of reaching energies up to 40 MeV (the bremsstrahlung process produces the photons). The link between TLEs and TGFs was one of the scientific questions of the TARANIS mission. The Lightning induced electron precipitation (LEP) were also to be studied. All these events have associated electromagnetic wave emissions which also had to be studied.

The Atmosphere-Space Interactions Monitor (ASIM) of the International Space Station was to operate concurrently with TARANIS and was to provide additional observations.

== Technical characteristics ==
The TARANIS microsatellite had a mass of 175 kg, and used the Myriade platform powered by solar panels providing 85 watts. The amount of data transferred should have been 24 Gigabits per day. The scientific payload was made of seven instruments:

- MCP (MicroCameras and Photometers), set of two cameras and three photometers, 30 frames/s, 512 x 512 pixels and measuring the luminance in several spectral bands at high resolution.
- XGRE (X-ray, Gamma-ray and Relativistic Electrons), set of three detectors to measure high energy photons (1 MeV to 10 MeV).
- IDEE (Instruments for the Detection of high-Energy Electrons), set of two electron detectors to measure their spectrum between 70 keV to 4 MeV together with their pitch angle. The sensors were developed by the IRAP (Institut de recherche en astrophysique et planétologie) astrophysics and planetology research institute.
- IME-BF, low frequency antenna to measure the electric field to a frequency up to 3.3 MHz.
- IME-HF, high frequency antenna to measure the electric field at frequencies of 100 kHz to 30 MHz.
- IMM, a tri-axis magnetometer of « search-coil » type to measure the magnetic field.
- MEXIC (MultiEXperiment Interface Controller).

The studied phenomena last not more than a few milliseconds (except blue jets), therefore a specific recording method is implemented. Scientific instruments operate continuously and data is stored in a memory that is regularly purged of its oldest elements. If a phenomenon is noticed through one of the triggering instrument (XGRE, IDEE, MCP, IME-HF), the data of all the instruments corresponding to the period it took place is saved, and later transmitted to the ground.

== Flight ==
After launch, TARANIS had to deploy instrument ramps and had to start several months of commissioning and validation. The scientific data were to be available from TARANIS in June 2021. CNES has devoted around 115 million euros, or US136 million, to the TARANIS project since its start in 2010. The mission was designed to operate over two to four years.

=== Launch failure ===
TARANIS was launched from the Centre Spatial Guyanais at 01:52:20 UTC on 17 November 2020. The flight was planned to deploy the satellites into 2 very slightly different sun-synchronous orbits at roughly 670 km (starting 54 minutes until 102 minutes after liftoff), before the upper stage would have re-ignited to re-enter the Earth's atmosphere. However, the rocket failed after launch and the mission was lost. The exact cause could be first ignition of the engine of the Avum fourth stage, a deviation of trajectory was identified, entailing the loss of the mission. Arianespace traces cause of Vega launch failure to "human error". This was the Vega rocket's second failure in three missions.

== Replacement ==
After TARANIS's failure to orbit, CNES started to plan a replacing mission TARANIS 2 in late 2020 and early 2021. TARANIS 2 is planned to achieve the same scientific objectives as TARANIS would have had TARANIS not failed. TARANIS 2 is planned to launch around 2025.

== See also ==
- French space program
- Guiana Space Centre
