= Ariane 1 =

European medium-lift space launch vehicle (1979–1986)

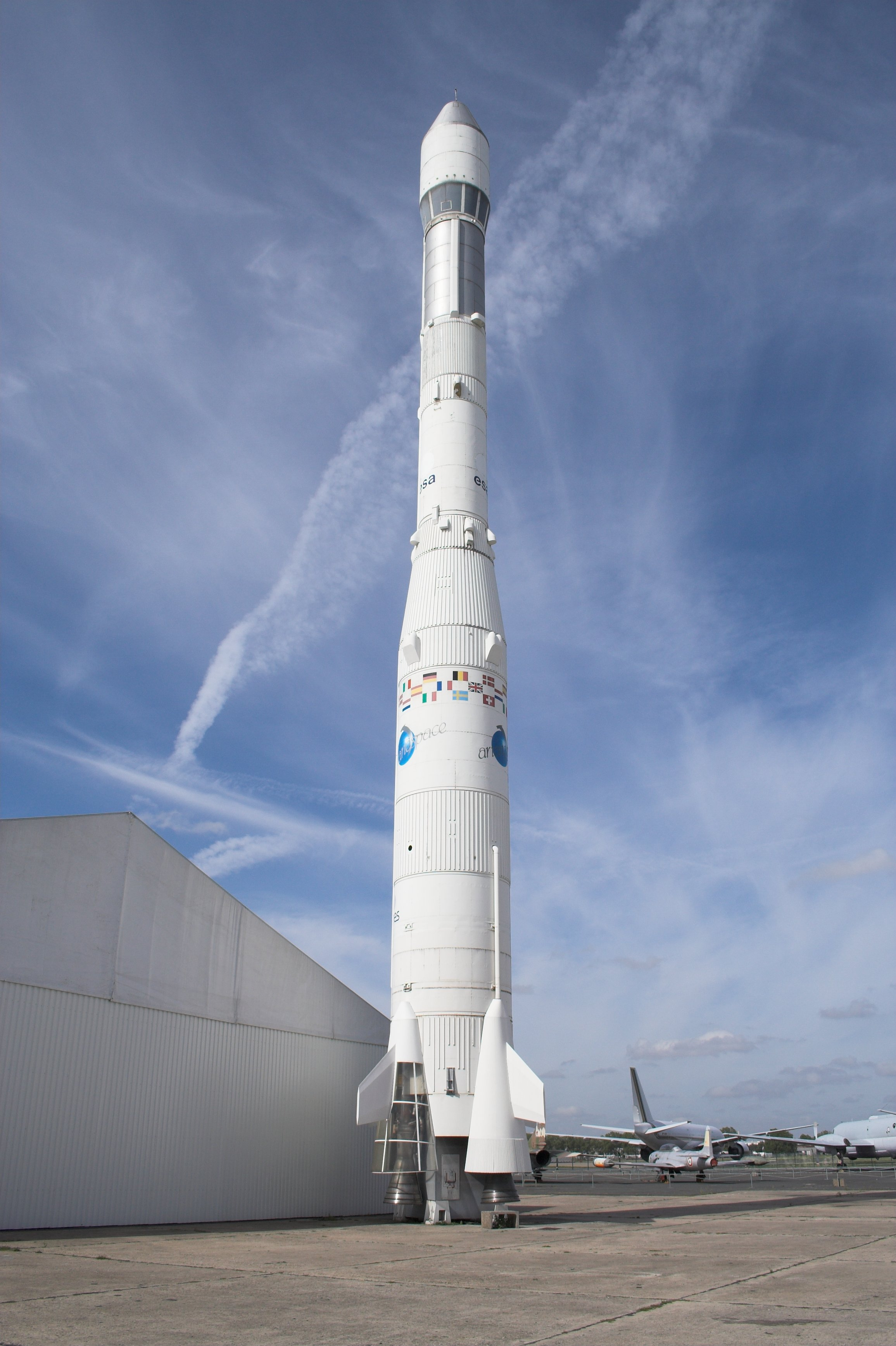
- Ariane 1 mock-up at the Musée de l'Air et de l'Espace, Le Bourget, Greater Paris
- Function: Medium lift launch vehicle
- Manufacturer: Aérospatiale
- Country of origin: France

Size
- Height: 50 m (160 ft)
- Diameter: 3.8 m (12 ft)
- Mass: 207,200 kg (456,800 lb)
- Stages: 3

Capacity

Payload to LEO
- Mass: 4,850 kilograms (10,690 lb)

Payload to GTO
- Mass: 1,850 kilograms (4,080 lb)

Launch history
- Status: Retired
- Launch sites: ELA-1, Guiana Space Centre
- Total launches: 11
- Success(es): 9
- Failure: 2
- First flight: 24 December 1979
- Last flight: 22 February 1986
- Carries passengers or cargo: Giotto

First stage
- Powered by: 4 Viking-2
- Maximum thrust: 2,771.940 kN (623,157 lbf)
- Specific impulse: 281 s (2.76 km/s)
- Burn time: 145 seconds
- Propellant: N_{2}O_{4} / UDMH

Second stage
- Powered by: 1 Viking-4
- Maximum thrust: 720.965 kN (162,079 lbf)
- Specific impulse: 296 s (2.90 km/s)
- Burn time: 132 seconds
- Propellant: N_{2}O_{4} / UDMH

Third stage
- Powered by: 1 HM7-A
- Maximum thrust: 61.674 kN (13,865 lbf)
- Specific impulse: 443 s (4.34 km/s)
- Burn time: 563 seconds
- Propellant: LH_{2} / LOX

Ariane 1 (French: [aʁjan œ̃]) was the first rocket in the Ariane family of expendable launch systems. It was developed for and operated by the European Space Agency (ESA), which had been formed in 1973, the same year that development of the launcher had commenced. Aérospatiale was designated to lead the programme. Ariane 1 was the first launcher to be developed with the primary purpose of sending commercial satellites into geosynchronous orbit. Crucially, it was designed with the ability of sending a pair of satellites into orbit on a single launcher, thus reducing costs.

As the size of satellites grew, Ariane 1 quickly gave way to the more powerful Ariane 2 and Ariane 3 launchers, which were heavily based upon the original rocket. The Ariane 4 was the last rocket to heavily draw upon the Ariane 1, as the successor rocket Ariane 5 uses a far greater proportion of all-new elements.

== Development ==
=== Origins ===
In 1975, ten European countries decided to pursue joint collaboration in the field of space exploration and formed a new pan-national organisation to undertake this mission, the European Space Agency (ESA). For some time prior to the ESA's formation, France had been lobbying for the development of a new European expendable launch system to serve as a replacement for the Europa rocket; one proposed successor in the form of a refined Europa, referred to as the Europa IIIB, was studied but was found to be too ambitious and costly. As a result, the Europa IIIB proposal was scaled back and soon reemerged as the L3S. Multinational effort became a quick focus point for the L3S proposal; early on, emphasis was placed upon cooperation on the initiative between Germany and France, while increasing contribution from other countries also came into the picture over time.

In January 1973, Willy Brandt, the Chancellor of Germany, formally agreed to the L3S project following a series of personal approaches by Georges Pompidou, the President of France. On 21 September 1973, the legal agreement for the L3S, was signed. Under this agreement, the Europa III was formally cancelled, while the L3S would be developed as a multinational project. From the onset, the launcher was to be developed for the purpose of sending commercial satellites into geosynchronous orbit, unlike many other competing launchers, which had been typically developed for other purposes and subsequently adapted, such as ballistic missiles. Development of L3S was seen as a crucial test for the ESA, the fortunes of the former being viewed as being highly indicative for the future of the latter. According to author Brian Harvey, L3S was "one of the major European engineering projects in the last quarter of the century".

France was the largest stakeholder in the L3S programme; French aerospace manufacturer Aérospatiale served as the prime contractor and held responsibility for performing the integration of all sections of the vehicle, while French engine manufacturer Société Européenne de Propulsion (SEP) provided both the first and second stage engines (the third stage engines were produced by Air Liquide and German aerospace manufacturer MBB). Other major companies involved included the French electronics firm Matra, Swedish manufacturer Volvo, and German aircraft producer Dornier Flugzeugwerke. The United Kingdom, which held a stake of 2.47 per cent in the project, provided the guidance system, developed by Ferranti, and the central digital computer, from Marconi; British Aerospace had later involvement and workshare as well. Early on, it was felt that the L3S designation lacked public appeal; out of several alternative names, including Phoenix, Lyra, Ganymede and Vega, French minister of industrial and scientific development Jean Charbonnel chose the name Ariane for the new launcher.

=== Preparation ===
During mid-1974, work on the Ariane was temporarily suspended as a result of the substantial cost involved; several other French space projects has incurred delays or funding shortages due to the ongoing development, which had led to disruption and greater funding being made available by the French government to their national space agency, the Centre national d'études spatiales (CNES). Development of the third stage was a major focus point for the project - prior to Ariane, only the United States had ever flown a launcher that utilised hydrogen-powered upper stages. During 1977 and 1978, preparations and testing commenced in anticipation of the first Ariane launch; while some issues were encountered during ground tests and engine firings, these had resulted in no meaningful delays and these milestones had been successfully passed. The ESA decided that there should be a total of four development flights flown prior to initiating commercial operations; however, vacant space was made available to operators for these flights on the proviso that success was not guaranteed.

In order to accommodate Ariane launches, the Guiana Space Centre at Kourou, French Guiana received extensive modifications. The former Europa launch site was re-designated as ELA 1 (Ensemble de Lancement Ariane 1 — lit. 'Ariane 1 Launch Complex') and was rebuilt with a lowered base and elongated tower. While all Ariane launches would take place from French Guiana, rocket construction would be performed at Aérospatiale's facility in Les Mureaux, near Paris. In order to deliver the rocket from the production facility to the launch site, each stage of the Ariane would be shipped on barges down the Seine to Le Havre, where they would be loaded onto an ocean-going vessel and be conveyed across the Atlantic Ocean to Kourou; a combination of roads and railways would transport the components inland to the space center itself. Once fully assembled, the rocket would be moved a short distance to the launch pad itself on a mobile rail-mounted platform and stored within a fully enclosed air conditioned service tower, where the payload would be installed and final checks performed under clean room conditions.

Prior to Ariane's first launch, there was some scepticism, much coming from American and British figures, that the endeavour was an expensive indulgence that could be unnecessary, and rendered uncompetitive, by the upcoming Space Shuttle, a partially reusable launch system that was then under development by NASA. By 1977, there had only been three initial customers lined up for Ariane; however, in December 1977, communications satellite operator Intelsat was persuaded to place an order for two Intelsat IVs to be launched using Ariane. This was considered a major coup for the programme as Intelsat was viewed as heavily committed to using the rival Space Shuttle launcher for a large number of its satellites at that point. One week later, ESA announced its commitment to a production run of 10 Ariane 1 launchers.

=== Maiden flight ===
There was considerable pressure for Ariane to perform its maiden flight prior to end of 1979. It was decided that Ariane should launch on 15 December 1979 and, 38 hours prior the launch, the countdown was initiated; however, a technical issue was encountered in the final hour which led to an abort. Despite fears that the launch would have to be delayed for a month, it was decided to resume the countdown for a second attempt. However, upon the countdown reaching zero, three seconds following engine ignition, the onboard computer decided to cut engine power due to erroneous sensor information indicating that engine pressure had been falling. Another attempt was quickly scheduled for 24 December 1979; this time, the launch was successfully executed and the first Ariane flight was performed, the firing button having been personally pressed by French President Valéry Giscard d'Estaing.

For the first flight, designated as L-O1 (Lancement [Launch] 01), the payload consisted of an Aeritalia-built test instrumentation system, known as CAT (Capsule Ariane Technologique — lit. 'Ariane Technological Capsule'), for the purpose of measuring all key stages of the ascent in great detail, such as noise, stress, acceleration, temperature, and pressure; this unit was also designed to simulate a real satellite payload. CAT was successfully placed into an orbit of 202 by 35,753 km (126 by 22,216 mi); the successful deployment of this payload indicated the end of the American monopoly on commercial satellite launches. On 26 March 1980, almost immediately after the success of LO-1, CNES and ESA created a new company for the purpose of promoting, marketing, and managing Ariane operations, choosing to name the venture Arianespace.

== Design ==
With lift-off mass of 210,000 kg (460,000 lb), Ariane 1 was able to put in geostationary transfer orbit one satellite or two smaller of a maximal weight of 1,850 kg (4,080 lb). The cost of program is estimated at 2 billion euros.

The Ariane 1 was a three-stage vehicle. The first stage was equipped with 4 Viking engines developed by the Société Européenne de Propulsion. The second stage had a single Viking engine. The third stage had one LOX/LH2 bipropellant engine capable of a thrust of 7,000 kgf (69 kN; 15,000 lbf). Satellites destined for geostationary orbit (GEO) used an additional space tug or onboard propulsion to transition from geostationary transfer orbit (GTO) to GEO.

This design was kept in the Ariane series until Ariane 4.

== Launches ==
On 24 December 1979, the first Ariane launch, designated as L-O1, was conducted, which was successful. However, in 1980, the second launch, L-O2 ended in a failure shortly after takeoff, which had been caused by a combustion instability that had occurred in one of the Viking first stage engines. The third launch, L-O3 succeeded, which resulted in the orbiting of three separate satellites; the fourth and last qualification launch, L-04, was also a success. However, during the fifth launch, which was the first commercial mission to be performed by Ariane, designated as L5, the rocket ceased functioning after 7 minutes of flight. This failure was traced back to a single turbopump in the third stage that had stopped functioning, and a significant re-design of elements of the third stage was performed as a result.

The failure of the first commercial flight had created a tense atmosphere along with a flurry of criticism being aired about the Ariane programme. Following the completion of a complete review of the programme, on 16 June 1983, the second commercial flight, L6 was successfully launched into orbit. This began a run of successful flight for the launcher, the following six flights were all successes. As a result of the repeated successes, orders for the type increased quickly; by early 1984, a total of 27 satellites had been booked for Ariane, which was half of the world market at that time. As a result of the commercial success, after the tenth Ariane mission was flown, the ESA transferred responsibility for Ariane over to Arianespace.

The Giotto mission's spaceprobe was successfully launched on the tenth Ariane 1 mission, V-14, on 2 July 1985. The first SPOT satellite was put into orbit by the eleventh and last launch of Ariane 1 on 22 February 1986. By early 1986, the Ariane 1, along with its Ariane 2 and Ariane 3 derivatives, were the dominant launcher on the world market.

== Launch history ==
#	Flight	Date	Launch Pad	Payload	Outcome	Reference	Remarks
1	L-01	24 December 1979	ELA-1	CAT-1	Success		First flight
2	L-02	23 May 1980	ELA-1	Firewheel Subsat-1,2,3,4 Amsat P3A; CAT 2	Failure		Combustion instability in one of the Viking first stage engines
3	L-03	19 June 1981	ELA-1	Meteosat 2 APPLE; CAT 3	Success		
4	L-04	20 December 1981	ELA-1	MARECS 1 CAT 4	Success		
5	L-5	9 September 1982	ELA-1	MARECS B Sirio 2	Failure		First commercial launch The rocket ceased functioning after 7 minutes of flight due to a turbopump failure in the third stage
6	L-6	16 June 1983	ELA-1	ECS 1 Amsat P3B (Oscar 10)	Success		
7	L-7	19 October 1983	ELA-1	Intelsat 507	Success		
8	L-8	5 March 1984	ELA-1	Intelsat 508	Success		
9	V-9	23 May 1984	ELA-1	Spacenet 1	Success		
10	V-14	2 July 1985	ELA-1	Giotto	Success		
11	V-16	22 February 1986	ELA-1	SPOT 1 Viking	Success		Last flight
