= List of Sentinel satellites =

The Sentinel satellites are a family of Earth observation satellites developed by the European Space Agency (ESA) for the Copernicus Programme of the European Union.

The program includes radar, optical, oceanographic, and atmospheric-monitoring satellites and payloads operating in low Earth orbit and geostationary orbit. Sentinel missions provide data for environmental monitoring, climate studies, emergency management, agriculture, and maritime surveillance.

The classes are Sentinel-1, Sentinel-2, Sentinel-3, Sentinel-4, Sentinel-5, Sentinel-6, Sentinel-7.

== List of Sentinel satellites ==
Satellite	Date	Rocket	Launch site	Orbit	Fate	Notes
Sentinel-1A	3 Apr 2014	Soyuz ST-A/Fregat	Guiana, Kourou, French Guiana	Sun-synchronous low Earth orbit	Active	First satellite of the Sentinel-1 radar mission.
Sentinel-2A	23 Jun 2015	Vega	Guiana, Kourou, French Guiana	Sun-synchronous low Earth orbit	Active	First Sentinel-2 optical imaging satellite.
Sentinel-3A	16 Feb 2016	Rockot/Briz-KM	Plesetsk, Russia	Sun-synchronous low Earth orbit	Active	Ocean and land monitoring satellite.
Sentinel-1B	25 Apr 2016	Soyuz ST-A/Fregat	Guiana, Kourou, French Guiana	Sun-synchronous low Earth orbit	Retired	Contact lost in December 2021; mission ended in August 2022.
Sentinel-2B	7 Mar 2017	Vega	Guiana, Kourou, French Guiana	Sun-synchronous low Earth orbit	Active	Companion satellite to Sentinel-2A.
Sentinel-5P	13 Oct 2017	Rockot	Plesetsk, Russia	Sun-synchronous low Earth orbit	Active	Precursor mission for Sentinel-5.
Sentinel-3B	25 Apr 2018	Rockot/Briz-KM	Plesetsk, Russia	Sun-synchronous low Earth orbit	Active	Second Sentinel-3 satellite.
Sentinel-6A	21 Nov 2020	Falcon 9 Block 5	Vandenberg, California, United States	Low Earth orbit	Active	Ocean altimetry mission.
Sentinel-2C	5 Sep 2024	Vega	Guiana, Kourou, French Guiana	Sun-synchronous low Earth orbit	Active	Replaced Sentinel-2A in the operational constellation.
Sentinel-1C	5 Dec 2024	Vega-C	Guiana, Kourou, French Guiana	Sun-synchronous low Earth orbit	Active	Restored the two-satellite Sentinel-1 constellation.
Sentinel-4A	1 Jul 2025	Ariane 6	Guiana, Kourou, French Guiana	Geostationary orbit	Active	Atmospheric-monitoring payload aboard MTG-S1.
Sentinel-5A	13 Aug 2025	Ariane 6	Guiana, Kourou, French Guiana	Sun-synchronous low Earth orbit	Active	Atmospheric spectrometer aboard MetOp-SG.
Sentinel-1D	4 Nov 2025	Ariane 6	Guiana, Kourou, French Guiana	Low Earth orbit	Active	Companion satellite to Sentinel-1C; launched to replace Sentinel-1A.
Sentinel-6B	17 Nov 2025	Falcon 9 Block 5	Vandenberg, California, United States	Low Earth orbit	Active	Ocean altimetry satellite for sea-level record alongside Sentinel-6A.
Sentinel-3C	15 Sep 2026	Vega-C	Guiana, Kourou, French Guiana	Low Earth orbit	Active	Ocean and land monitoring

== Planned satellites ==
- Sentinel-2D
- Sentinel-7A
- Sentinel-7B
- Sentinel-7C

== See also ==
- Earth observation satellite
- European Space Agency
- Copernicus Programme
