= Vega C =

European small-lift launch vehicle

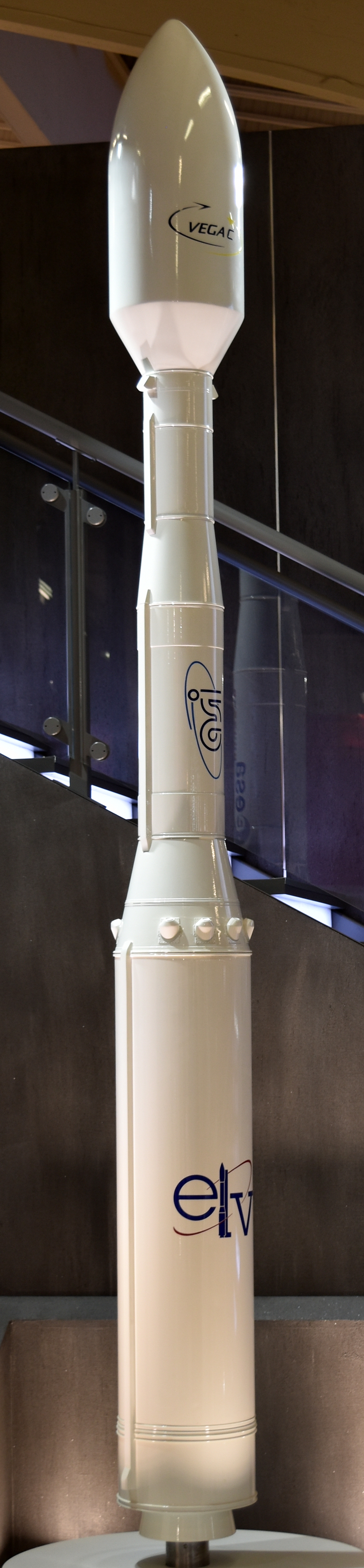
- Model of Vega C at Paris Air Show 2015
- Function: Medium-lift launch vehicle
- Manufacturer: Avio
- Country of origin: European multi-national (Note: The lead manufacturer is from Italy, but the rocket has significant contributions from companies based in Belgium, France, Netherlands, Spain, Switzerland and Ukraine.)
- Cost per launch: €48 million (2022)

Size
- Height: 34.8 m (114 ft)
- Diameter: 3.4 m (11 ft)
- Mass: 210,000 kg (460,000 lb)
- Stages: 4

Capacity

Payload to SSO
- Altitude: 700 km (430 mi)
- Orbital inclination: 90°
- Mass: 2,300 kg (5,100 lb)

Payload to polar orbit
- Altitude: 500 km (310 mi)
- Orbital inclination: 88°
- Mass: 2,250 kg (4,960 lb)

Payload to equatorial elliptical orbit
- Altitude: 5,700 km × 250 km (3,540 mi × 160 mi)
- Orbital inclination: 6°
- Mass: 1,700 kg (3,700 lb)

Associated rockets
- Family: Vega
- Comparable: Alpha; Kinetica 1; Epsilon; Minotaur; Tianlong-2; PSLV; Soyuz-2.1v

Launch history
- Status: Active
- Launch sites: Guiana, ELV
- Total launches: 8
- Success(es): 7
- Failure: 1 (VV22)
- First flight: 13 July 2022
- Last flight: 15 September 2026 (most recent)

First stage – P120C
- Height: 13.38 m (43.9 ft)
- Diameter: 3.4 m (11 ft)
- Empty mass: 11,200 kg (24,700 lb)
- Gross mass: 155,027 kg (341,776 lb)
- Propellant mass: 141,634 kg (312,250 lb)
- Maximum thrust: 4,323 kN (972,000 lb_{f})
- Specific impulse: 279 s (2.74 km/s)
- Burn time: 135.7 seconds
- Propellant: HTPB / AP / Al

Second stage – Zefiro 40
- Height: 8.07 m (26.5 ft)
- Diameter: 2.4 m (7 ft 10 in)
- Empty mass: 3,230 kg (7,120 lb)
- Gross mass: 40,477 kg (89,237 lb)
- Propellant mass: 36,239 kg (79,893 lb)
- Maximum thrust: 1,304 kN (293,000 lb_{f})
- Specific impulse: 293.5 s (2.878 km/s)
- Burn time: 92.9 seconds
- Propellant: HTPB / AP / Al

Third stage – Zefiro 9
- Height: 4.12 m (13.5 ft)
- Diameter: 1.9 m (6 ft 3 in)
- Empty mass: 929 kg (2,048 lb)
- Gross mass: 12,000 kg (26,000 lb)
- Propellant mass: 10,567 kg (23,296 lb)
- Maximum thrust: 317 kN (71,000 lb_{f})
- Specific impulse: 295.9 s (2.902 km/s)
- Burn time: 119.6 seconds
- Propellant: HTPB / AP / Al

Fourth stage – AVUM+
- Height: 2.04 m (6 ft 8 in)
- Diameter: 2.18 m (7 ft 2 in)
- Empty mass: 695 kg (1,532 lb)
- Propellant mass: 492 kg (1,085 lb) of N_{2}O_{4}; 248 kg (547 lb) of UDMH
- Powered by: 1 × RD-843 (MEA)
- Maximum thrust: 2.42 kN (540 lb_{f})
- Specific impulse: 315.8 s (3.097 km/s)
- Burn time: 924.8 seconds (up to five burns) (Note: Engines can burn up to 612.5 seconds per burn and can burn up to five times. Maximum cumulative burn time of 924.8 seconds.)
- Propellant: UDMH / N_{2}O_{4}

Vega C, or Vega Consolidation, is a European expendable, medium-lift launch vehicle developed and produced by Avio. It is an evolution of the original Vega launcher, designed to offer greater launch performance and flexibility.

Approved for development by the European Space Agency (ESA) in December 2014, Vega C was designed to accommodate larger institutional payloads and compete effectively in the commercial launch market. Initially marketed and operated by Arianespace, the ESA decided in August 2024 to empower Avio to directly commercialize Vega C and seek non-governmental customers. This transition is anticipated to be complete by the end of 2025.

Vega C, like its predecessor, is designed to launch small satellites for scientific and Earth observation missions to polar and sun-synchronous low Earth orbits. The reference Vega C mission places a 2,300-kilogram (5,100 lb) spacecraft into a 700-kilometre (430 mi) polar orbit, representing an 800-kilogram (1,800 lb) or 60% increase over the original Vega.

Named after Vega, the brightest star in the constellation Lyra, the rocket is a single-body launcher (no strap-on boosters) with three solid and one liquid stage. While Avio of Italy leads the Vega program, contributions come from companies in Belgium, France, the Netherlands, Spain, Switzerland and Ukraine.

Vega C introduces several key advancements over the original Vega. The first stage has been replaced by the more powerful P120C, the "C" refers to its common design allowing it to be used as a booster for the Ariane 6 launcher, enabling shared development costs. The second stage features the upgraded Zefiro 40. While the AVUM+ (Attitude & Vernier Upper Module) fourth stage remains largely unchanged, the "+" reflects its increased propellant capacity. The third stage, Zefiro 9, remains the same.

Vega rockets are launched from the ELV launch pad at the Guiana Space Centre. The Vega C's maiden flight on 13 July 2022 successfully delivered LARES 2 and six other satellites to orbit. However, the second launch on 21 December 2022 experienced a failure of the Zefiro 40 second stage, resulting in the loss of two Pléiades Neo Earth-imaging satellites. Consequently, the next launch was delayed until late 2024 to allow for the rocket motor nozzle to be redesigned.

== Specifications ==
=== Stages ===
Stages	Stage 1 P120C	Stage 2 Zefiro 40	Stage 3 Zefiro 9	Stage 4 AVUM+
Height	13.38 m (43 ft 11 in)	8.07 m (26 ft 6 in)	4.12 m (13 ft 6 in)	2.04 m (6 ft 8 in)
Diameter	3.4 m (11 ft 2 in)	2.4 m (7 ft 10 in)	1.9 m (6 ft 3 in)	2.18 m (7 ft 2 in)
Propellant type	Solid (HTPB/AP/Al)	Solid (HTPB/AP/Al)	Solid (HTPB/AP/Al)	Liquid (UDMH/N_{2}O_{4})
Gross mass	155,027 kg (341,776 lb)	40,477 kg (89,237 lb)	12,000 kg (26,000 lb)	1,436 kg (3,166 lb)
Propellant mass	141,634 kg (312,250 lb)	36,239 kg (79,893 lb)	10,567 kg (23,296 lb)	740 kg (1,630 lb)
Average thrust	4,323 kN (972,000 lb_{f})	1,304 kN (293,000 lb_{f})	317 kN (71,000 lb_{f})	2.45 kN (550 lb_{f})
Burn time (sec.)	135.7	92.9	119.6	924.8 (up to 5 burns)
Specific impulse	279 s (2.74 km/s)	293.5 s (2.878 km/s)	295.9 s (2.902 km/s)	315.8 s (3.097 km/s)

=== Main suppliers ===
Building the Vega is a European multi-national effort led by Avio of Italy, which manages Vega development and oversees production as the prime contractor, and also builds the Zefiro 40, Zefiro 9 and AVUM+ stages. Europropulsion, a 50–50 joint venture of Avio and ArianeGroup, builds the P120C first stage. Airbus Netherlands B.V. of the Netherlands builds the interstage between the first and second stages. The Italian Aerospace Research Centre builds the interstage between the second and third stages. Beyond Gravity of Switzerland builds the payload fairing and onboard GNC computer. SABCA of Belgium builds the thrust vector control systems.

=== Payload capacity ===
Arianespace had indicated that the Vega C launcher is able to carry 2,300 kg (5,100 lb) to a circular polar orbit at an altitude of 700 km (430 mi).

Because of its ability to carry heavier payloads, Beyond Gravity had to redesign the fairing of the Vega C. The new fairing is 3.3 m (11 ft) in diameter and over 9 m (30 ft) tall, which offers nearly double the payload volume of the original Vega, which had a fairing of 2.6 m (8 ft 6 in) in diameter and over 7.8 m (26 ft) tall.

=== Ascent timeline ===
This timeline of a typical Vega C ascent profile and associated sequence of events includes two AVUM+ boosts. However, the flight profile is optimized for each mission.

Event	Time (sec.)	Altitude km (mi)	Velocity m/s (ft/s)
P120C ignition & lift-off	0	0	0
P120C burn-out & separation, Zefiro 40 ignition	142	60 (37)	1,885 (6,180)
Zefiro 40 burn-out & separation	245	121 (75)	4,555 (14,940)
Zefiro 9 ignition	249	123 (76)	4,550 (14,900)
Fairing jettisoning	254	126 (78)	4,600 (15,000)
Zefiro 9 separation	417	190 (120)	7,564 (24,820)
AVUM+ 1st ignition	448	199 (124)	7,553 (24,780)
AVUM+ 1st cut-off	1,090	300 (190)	7,885 (25,870)
AVUM+ 2nd ignition	3,151	619 (385)	7,533 (24,710)
AVUM+ 2nd cut-off	3,287	623 (387)	7,631 (25,040)
Spacecraft separation	3,427	626 (389)	7,627 (25,020)

== Future ==
=== Vega C+ ===
A mid-life upgrade, the Vega C+ will feature the enlarged P160C first stage, replacing the P120C. This version has been extended by 1 metre (3 ft 3 in) and adds an additional 14 tonnes (31,000 lb) of propellant, enabling the launch of an additional 200 kilograms (440 lb) of payload.

Other changes include a revised navigation system, a larger fairing, additional stabilization on the second- and third-stage motor nozzles, updated components, and efforts to ease production and flight-rate constraints.

The first flight of Vega C+ is not expected before 2028, when it is planned to launch ESA's reusable Space Rider vehicle. The schedule reflects the fact that early production of the P160C motor is being prioritized for Ariane 6 missions that require the added performance.

=== Vega E ===
Building on Vega C+, the Vega E (or Vega Evolution) is a further development of the Vega family with the Zefiro 9 and AVUM+ third and fourth stages replaced with a single upper stage powered by liquid oxygen and liquid methane. The improvements are expected to improve payload capacity by 25% over Vega C. This design would enable multiple satellites to be launched into different orbits on a single launch. The engine for this new upper stage, the M10, was the result of a collaboration between Avio and Chemical Automatics Design Bureau (KBKhA). Successful testing of the M10 engine was conducted in 2022, and the maiden flight of Vega E is anticipated in 2027. Launch Complex 3 at the Guiana Space Centre, initially built for the Ariane 5, is being refurbished to support Vega E launches.

=== Vega Next ===
For the Vega Next rocket, expected to be introduced after 2032, Avio plans to develop a new M60 engine, a larger version of the liquid oxygen and liquid methane fueled M10 engine. The M60 would be the building block for this launcher, and could potentially enable the development of a reusable first-stage.

== List of flights ==
Flight	Date / time (UTC)	Rocket	Launch site	Payload	Payload mass	Orbit	Customers	Launch outcome
VV21	13 July 2022; 13:13:17	Vega C	ELV	LARES 2; ALPHA; AstroBio CubeSat; CELESTA; GreenCube; MTCube-2; TRISAT-R	350 kg (770 lb)	MEO	Italian Space Agency; Sapienza University of Rome; University of Montpellier; University of Maribor	Success
VV21	First flight of Vega C							
VV22	21 December 2022; 01:47:31	Vega C	ELV	Pléiades Neo 5 & 6	1,977 kg (4,359 lb)	SSO	Airbus Defence and Space	Failure
VV22	Earth observation satellites. Failure due to loss of pressure of the Zefiro 40 second stage.							
VV25	5 December 2024; 21:20:33	Vega C	ELV	Sentinel-1C	2,300 kg (5,100 lb)	SSO	ESA	Success
VV25	Third Sentinel-1 satellite. Return to flight for Vega C following the VV22 launch failure.							
VV26	29 April 2025; 09:15	Vega C	ELV	BIOMASS	1,131 kg (2,493 lb)	SSO	ESA	Success
VV26	Earth observation satellite. Part of the Living Planet Programme.							
VV27	26 July 2025; 02:03	Vega C	ELV	CO3D × 4 + MicroCarb	1,320 kg (2,910 lb)	SSO	CNES	Success
VV27	The CO3D (Constellation Optique en 3D) is an Earth observation satellite constellation providing daily 50 cm (20 in) resolution stereo imagery for global 3D mapping; MicroCarb is a microsatellite measuring atmospheric CO₂ with 1 ppm accuracy to track global sources and sinks.							
VV28	1 December 2025; 17:21	Vega C	ELV	KOMPSAT-7 (Arirang-7)	1,810 kg (3,990 lb)	SSO	KARI	Success
VV28	Earth observation satellite.							
VV29	19 May 2026; 03:52	Vega C	ELV	SMILE	2,200 kg (4,900 lb)	HEO	ESA / CAS	Success
VV29	Solar wind Magnetosphere Ionosphere Link Explorer (SMILE) is a joint Chinese–European Earth observation satellite designed to study the magnetosphere with soft X-rays and UV. First launch to be operated by Avio without Arianespace.							
VV30	15 September 2026; 01:21	Vega C	ELV	Sentinel-3C, FLEX	1,540 kg (3,400 lb)	SSO	ESA	Success
VV30	Third Sentinel-3 Earth observation satellite. Secondary payload is ESA's Fluorescence Explorer (FLEX) mission.							

=== Planned launches ===
Date / time (UTC)	Rocket	Launch site	Payload	Orbit
December 2026	Vega C	ELV	IRIDE × ?	LEO
December 2026	First launch for the Italian IRIDE Earth observation satellite constellation.			
April 2027	Vega C	ELV	KOMPSAT-6 (Arirang-6)	SSO
April 2027	Earth observation satellite. PLATiNO-1 as secondary payload.			
1H 2027	Vega C	ELV	CSG-4	SSO
1H 2027	Fourth COSMO-SkyMed 2nd Generation satellite.			
November 2027	Vega C	ELV	CO2M-A (Sentinel-7A) / PLATiNO-2	SSO
November 2027	Copernicus Anthropogenic Carbon Dioxide Monitoring, part of the Copernicus Programme. PLATiNO-2 will host the MAIA instrument payload.			
2027	Vega C	ELV	Amazônia 1B	SSO
2027	Brazilian satellite for monitoring Amazonian deforestation			
2027	Vega C	ELV	FORMOSAT-8C	SSO
2027	Taiwan Space Agency Earth observation satellite			
Late 2027 to early 2028	Vega C	ELV	CRISTAL-A (Sentinel-9A)	Polar
Late 2027 to early 2028	Copernicus Polar Ice and Snow Topography Altimeter. Part of the Copernicus Programme.			
March 2028	Vega C	ELV	CO2M-B (Sentinel-7B)	SSO
March 2028	Copernicus Anthropogenic Carbon Dioxide Monitoring. Part of the Copernicus Programme.			
Q1 2028	Vega C+	ELV	Space Rider	LEO
Q1 2028	Technology demonstration			
Q4 2028	Vega C	ELV	ALTIUS	SSO
Q4 2028	ALTIUS is an ozone observation satellite.			
2028	Vega C	ELV	CHIME-A (Sentinel-10)	SSO
2028	Copernicus Hyperspectral Imaging Mission. Part of the Copernicus Programme.			
2028	Vega C	ELV	Eagle-1	LEO
2028	Demonstrator satellite for the first European sovereign space-based quantum key distribution system.			
2028	Vega C	ELV	FORMOSAT-8D	SSO
2028	Taiwan Space Agency Earth observation satellite			
2028	Vega C	ELV	FORMOSAT-9A	SSO
2028	Taiwan Space Agency Earth observation satellite			
2028	Vega C	ELV	FORUM	SSO
2028	Earth observation satellite. Part of the Living Planet Programme.			
2028	Vega C	ELV	Sentinel-3D	SSO
2028	Fourth Sentinel-3 Earth observation satellite.			
2028	Vega C	ELV	Sentinel-2D	LEO
2028	Fourth Sentinel-2 Earth observation satellite.			
Q3 2029	Vega C	ELV	CIMR-A (Sentinel-11A)	SSO
Q3 2029	Copernicus Imaging Microwave Radiometer. Part of the Copernicus Programme.			
2029	Vega C	ELV	ClearSpace-1	LEO
2029	Space debris removal demo.			
2029	Vega C	ELV	LSTM (Sentinel-8)	SSO
2029	Copernicus Land Surface Temperature Monitoring. Part of the Copernicus Programme.			
2029	Vega C	ELV	Harmony	LEO
2029	Earth Explorer 10 Mission.			
2029	Vega C	ELV	SBG-TIR	LEO
2029	Surface Biology and Geology-Thermal Infrared.			
2030	Vega C	ELV	CHIME-B (Sentinel-10)	SSO
2030	Copernicus Hyperspectral Imaging Mission. Part of the Copernicus Programme.			
2030	Vega C	ELV	FORMOSAT-9B	SSO
2030	Taiwan Space Agency Earth observation satellite			
TBD	Vega C	ELV	IRIDE × ?	LEO
TBD	Second launch for the Italian IRIDE Earth observation satellite constellation.			
TBD	Vega C	ELV	SHALOM	SSO
TBD	Joint Italian-Israeli hyperspectral imaging satellite.			

== See also ==
- List of Vega launches
- Solid rocket
- Comparison of orbital launchers families
- Comparison of orbital launch systems
