= Sentinel-2D =

European optical imaging satellite

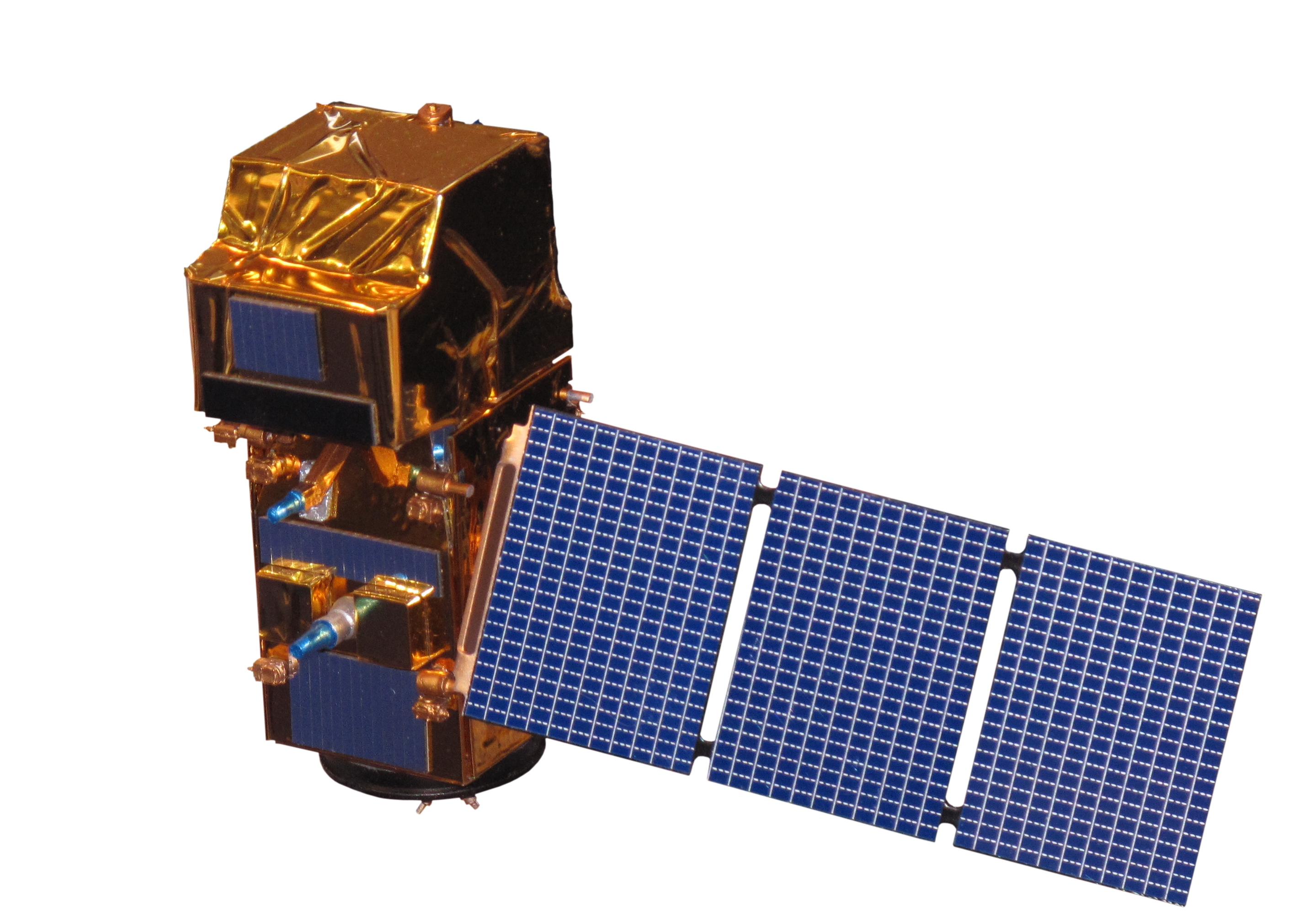
- Model of a Sentinel 2 satellite
- Mission type: Earth observation
- Operator: ESA

Start of mission
- Launch date: 2028 (planned)
- Rocket: Vega C

Sentinel-2D is a European optical imaging Earth observation satellite expected to launch in 2028 on Vega C. It is the fourth Sentinel-2 satellite within the European Union's Copernicus Programme. Like Sentinel-2A, Sentinel-2B, and Sentinel-2C, the satellite will carry a multispectral imager that takes high-resolution images of Earth's land, islands, and inland and coastal waters in 13 spectral bands with 10m, 20m, and 60m resolution. Its data will be used for monitoring land use, soil sealing, land management, agriculture, forestry, natural disasters, and to assist humanitarian aid missions.

== See also ==
- List of European Space Agency programmes and missions
