= Vega C flight VV22 =

Vega C launch
- Launch: 21 December 2022, 01:47:31 UTC
- Operator: Arianespace
- Pad: Guiana Space Centre, ELV
- Payload: Pléiades Neo 5 & 6
- Outcome: Failure

Vega launches

Vega C flight VV22 was the second launch of a Vega C rocket and the 22nd launch overall of a Vega family rocket. The rocket failed after launch, and the mission was lost.

== Payload ==
The payload was the Pléiades Neo 5 & 6 satellites, which would have been the final satellites of France's Pléiades Neo constellation. The total payload mass was approximately 1,977 kilograms (4,359 lb) with their adapters and dispensers. They were Airbus' 138th and 139th satellites launched by Arianespace respectively.

== Flight ==
The flight was launched from the ELV launch pad at the Guiana Space Centre.

=== Launch failure ===
The flight was planned to deploy the satellites into two very slightly different sun-synchronous orbits at roughly 620 km (390 mi; 330 nmi). However, the rocket failed after launch, and the mission was lost; it was caused by the deviation of the Zefiro 40 second stage from its intended trajectory following a loss of chamber pressure, resulting in reentry about 917 km (570 mi; 495 nmi) north of the launch site over the Atlantic. The problem arose due to erosion of the throat insert procured at KB Pivdenne in Ukraine.

== See also ==
- List of Vega launches
