= Pléiades (satellite) =

French Earth observation satellite

Pléiades-1A and Pléiades-1B
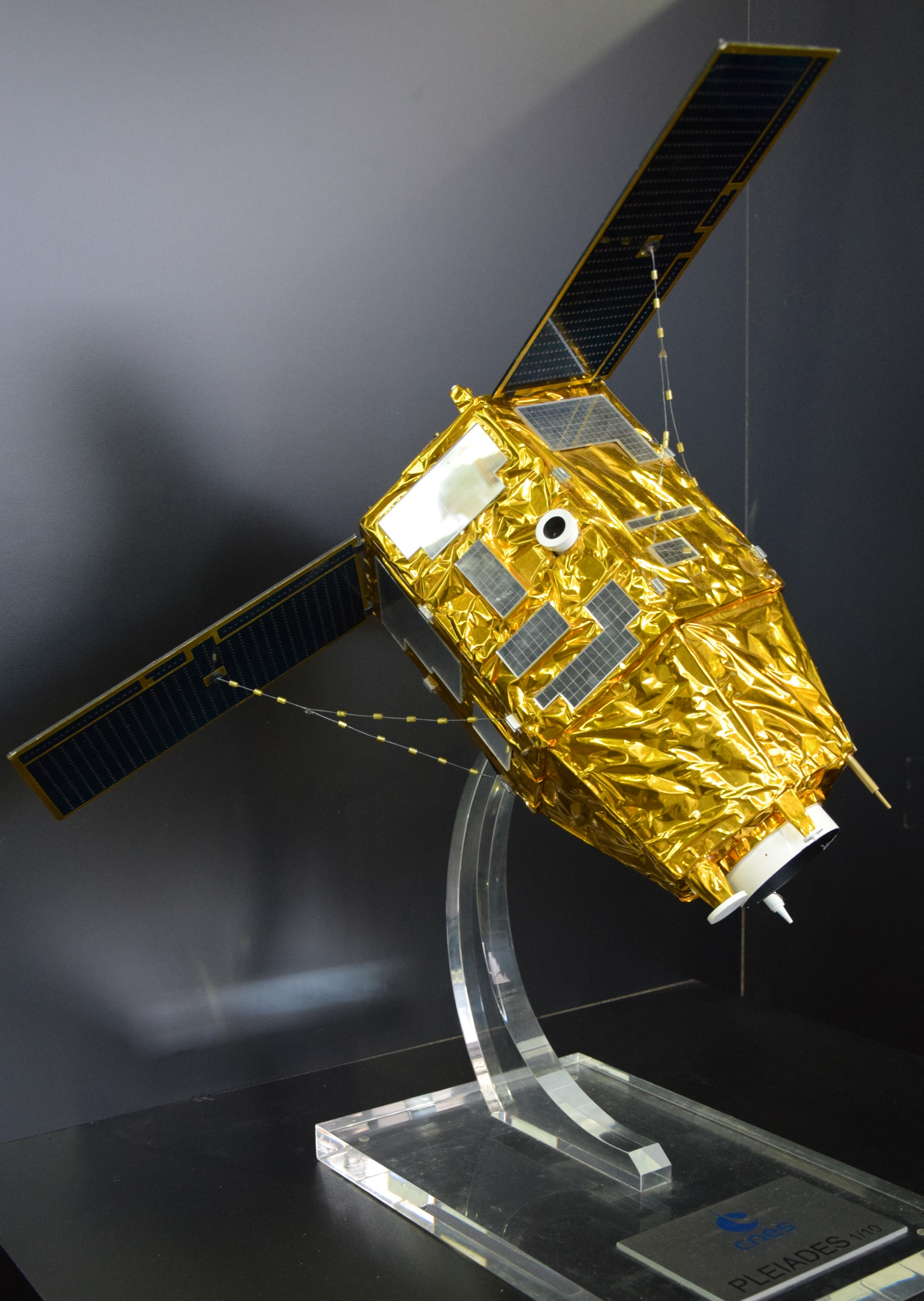
- Pléiades satellite
- Mission type: Earth observation/Reconnaissance
- Operator: CNES
- COSPAR ID: 1A: 2011-076F; 1B: 2012-068A
- SATCAT no.: 1A: 38012; 1B: 39019
- Website: CNES (Pléiades satellites)
- Mission duration: 5 years (planned)

Spacecraft properties
- Bus: Astrosat-1000
- Manufacturer: EADS Astrium Satellites
- Launch mass: 970 kg (2,140 lb) (each)

Start of mission
- Launch date: 1A: 02:03, 17 December 2011 (UTC); 1B: 02:02, 2 December 2012 (UTC)
- Rocket: Soyuz ST-A / Fregat
- Launch site: Centre Spatial Guyanais, ELS

Orbital parameters
- Reference system: Geocentric orbit
- Regime: Sun-synchronous orbit
- Altitude: 695 km (432 mi)
- Inclination: 98.2°

The Pléiades is a satellite constellation of very-high-resolution optical Earth-imaging satellites.

First two satellites, Pléiades-1A and Pléiades-1B, provide the coverage of Earth's surface with a repeat cycle of 26 days. Designed as a dual civil/military system, Pléiades will meet the space imagery requirements of European defence as well as civil and commercial needs.

== History ==
The Pléiades system was designed under the French-Italian ORFEO Programme (Optical and Radar Federated Earth Observation) between 2001 and 2003.

The Pléiades programme was launched in October 2003 with CNES (the French space agency) as the overall system prime contractor and EADS Astrium as the prime contractor for the space segment.

Spot Image is the official and exclusive worldwide distributor of Pléiades products and services under a delegated public service agreement.

== Launches ==
- Pléiades-1A was launched via a Russian Soyuz ST-A launch vehicle of the Centre Spatial Guyanais, Kourou, French Guiana, on 17 December 2011 at 02:03 UTC.
- Pléiades-1B was launched via a Russian Soyuz ST-A launch vehicle of the Centre Spatial Guyanais, Kourou, French Guiana, on 2 December 2012 at 02:02 UTC.
- Pléiades-Neo 3 was launched on 29 April 2021 by Vega rocket (with NORSAT 3, AII-Bravo, ELO Alpha, Lemur-2 138, 139).
- Pléiades-Neo 4 was launched on 17 August 2021 by Vega rocket (with BRO 4, RADCUBE, Sunstorm, LEDSAT).
- Pléiades Neo 5 & 6 were launched on 21 December 2022 01:47 UTC by Vega C rocket, flight VV22. Failure due to loss of pressure of the Zefiro 40 second stage.

== Technologies ==
=== Orbit ===
The two satellites operate in the same phased orbit and are offset at 180° to offer a daily revisit capability over any point on the globe. The Pléiades also share the same orbital plane as the SPOT 6 and 7, forming a larger constellation with 4 satellites, 90° apart from one another.

- Orbit: Sun-synchronous, phased, near-circular
- Mean altitude: 695 km

=== Equipment ===
Equipped with technologies like fibre-optic gyroscopes and control moment gyroscopes, Pléiades-HR 1A, and 1B offer roll, pitch, and yaw (slew) agility, enabling the system to maximize the number of acquisitions above a given area.

=== Agility for Responsive Tasking ===
This agility coupled with particularly dynamic image acquisition programming make the Pléiades system very responsive to specific user requirements. Individual user requests was answered in record time, thanks to multiple programming plans per day and a state-of-the-art image processing chain. Performance at a glance:

- Image acquisition anywhere within an 800-km-wide ground strip with 70 cm of resolution
- Along-track stereo and tri-stereo image acquisition
- Single-pass collection of mosaics (strip-mapping) with a footprint up to a square degree
- Maximum theoretical acquisition capacity of 1,000,000 km^{2} per day and per satellite
- Optimized daily acquisition capacity (taking into account genuine order book, weather constraints, conflicts...) reaching 300,000 km^{2} per day and per satellite

=== Products ===
Resolution	Panchromatic: 50 cm
	Multispectral: 2 m
	Pansharpened: 50 cm
	Bundle: 50 cm PAN and 2 m MS
Footprint	20 km swath
	Single pass mosaics up to 100 x 100 km

=== Ground receiving stations ===
When satellite operations begin, four ground receiving stations will be deployed for the direct downlink and archiving of imagery data:

- Two defence centres in France and Spain
- Two civil stations: one in Toulouse (France) and a polar station in Kiruna (Sweden), which receives most of the data

Regional receiving stations (fixed or mobile) are subsequently installed at the request of users.

=== Uplink Stations ===
The Pléiades tasking plan are refreshed and uploaded three times per day, allowing for last minute requests and the ability to utilize up-to-the-minute weather forecasts.

- The Kerguelen Island station uploads the morning pass, over Europe, Africa and the Middle East.
- The Swedish station takes care of midday orbits, over North and South Americas.
- The French station transmits the last tasking plan of the day over Asia and Oceania.

== See also ==
- Geographic information system (GIS)
- Remote sensing
- Pléiades Neo
