= Orfeo Programme =

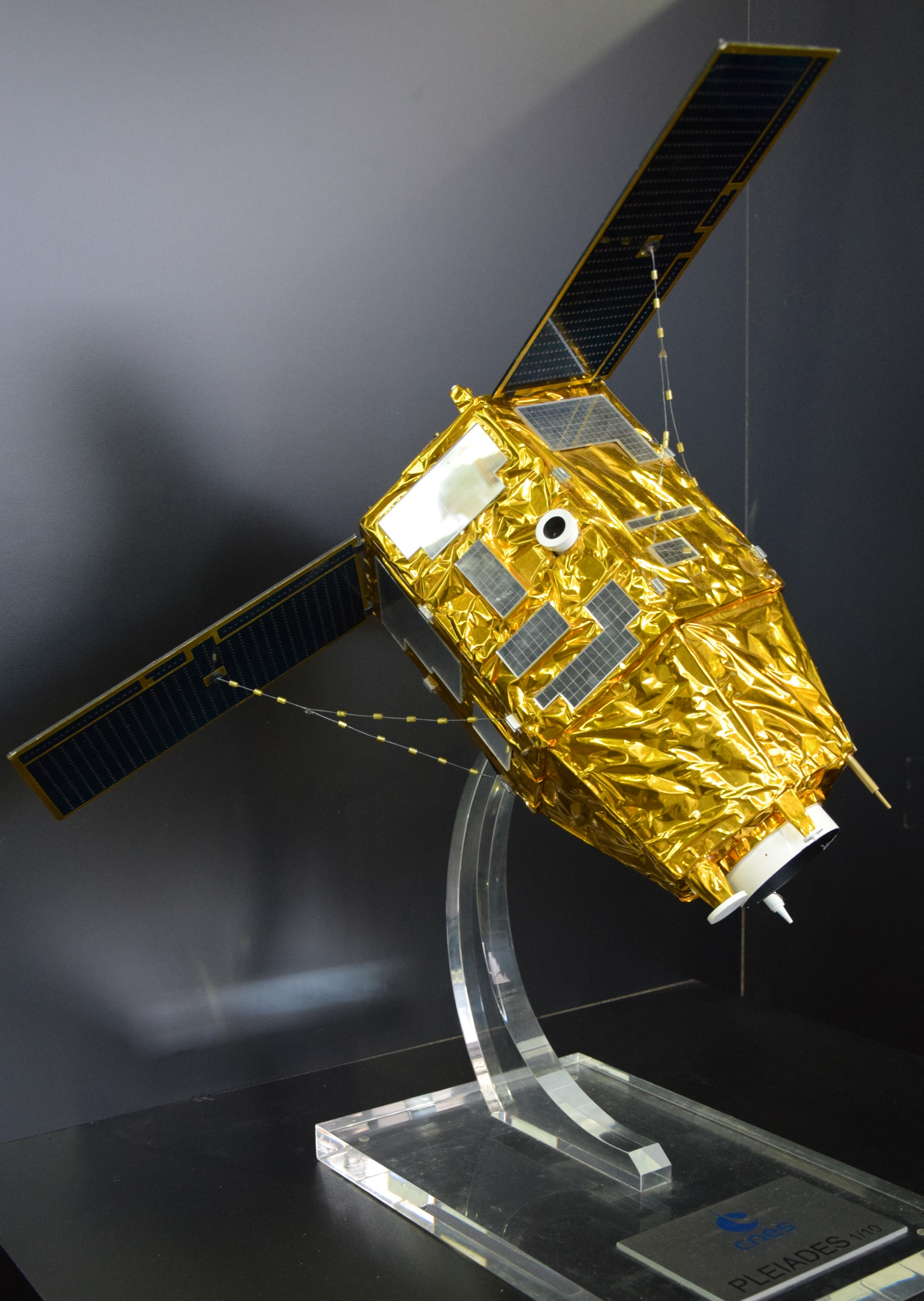
Pléiades satellite

The ORFEO programme (Optical and Radar Federated Earth Observation) was an agreement between France and Italy about coordinating Earth observation satellites development and use. The countries agreed to implement co-operation for setting up an Earth observation capability using optical and radar sensors, and to define the context in which the dual-purpose system (military and civilian) was to be developed and used. It was composed of 6 high-resolution satellites: 4 COSMO-SkyMed X-band satellites from Italy, and 2 Pléiades optical satellites from France. The agreement was signed on 29 January 2001 in Turin.
