= Sentinel-2C =

European optical imaging satellite

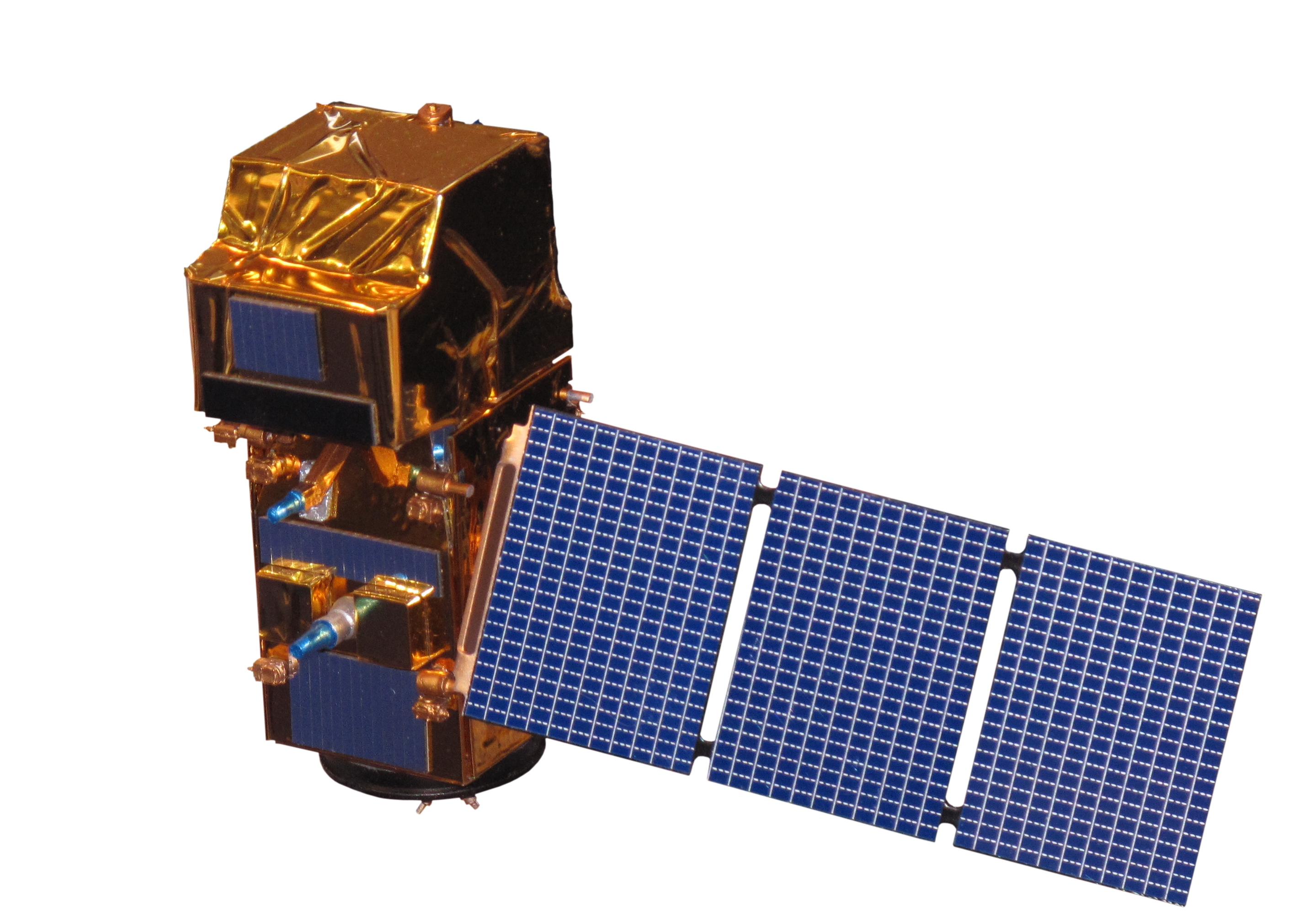
- Model of a Sentinel 2 satellite
- Mission type: Earth observation
- Operator: ESA
- COSPAR ID: 2024-157A
- SATCAT no.: 60989

Start of mission
- Launch date: September 5, 2024, 03:50 CEST
- Rocket: Vega

Orbital parameters
- Altitude: 786 km

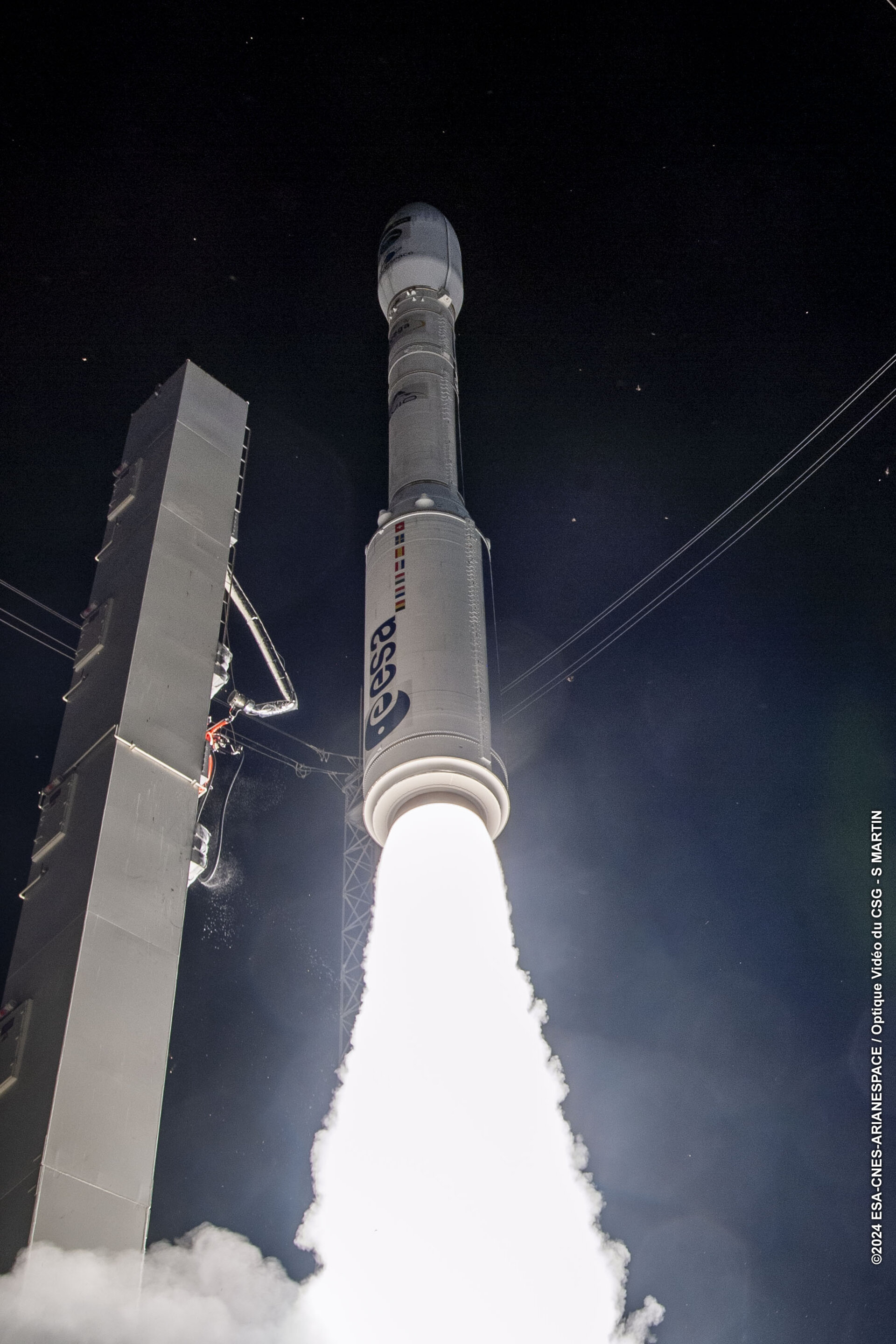
Launch of Vega with Sentinel-2C

Sentinel-2C is a European optical imaging Earth observation satellite that was launched in 2024. It is the third Sentinel-2 satellite launched as part of the European Union's Copernicus Programme. Like Sentinel-2A and Sentinel-2B, the satellite carries a multispectral imager that takes high-resolution images of Earth's land, islands, and inland and coastal waters in 13 spectral bands with 10m, 20m, and 60m resolution. Its data are used for monitoring land use, soil sealing, land management, agriculture, forestry, natural disasters, and to assist humanitarian aid missions.

== Gallery ==
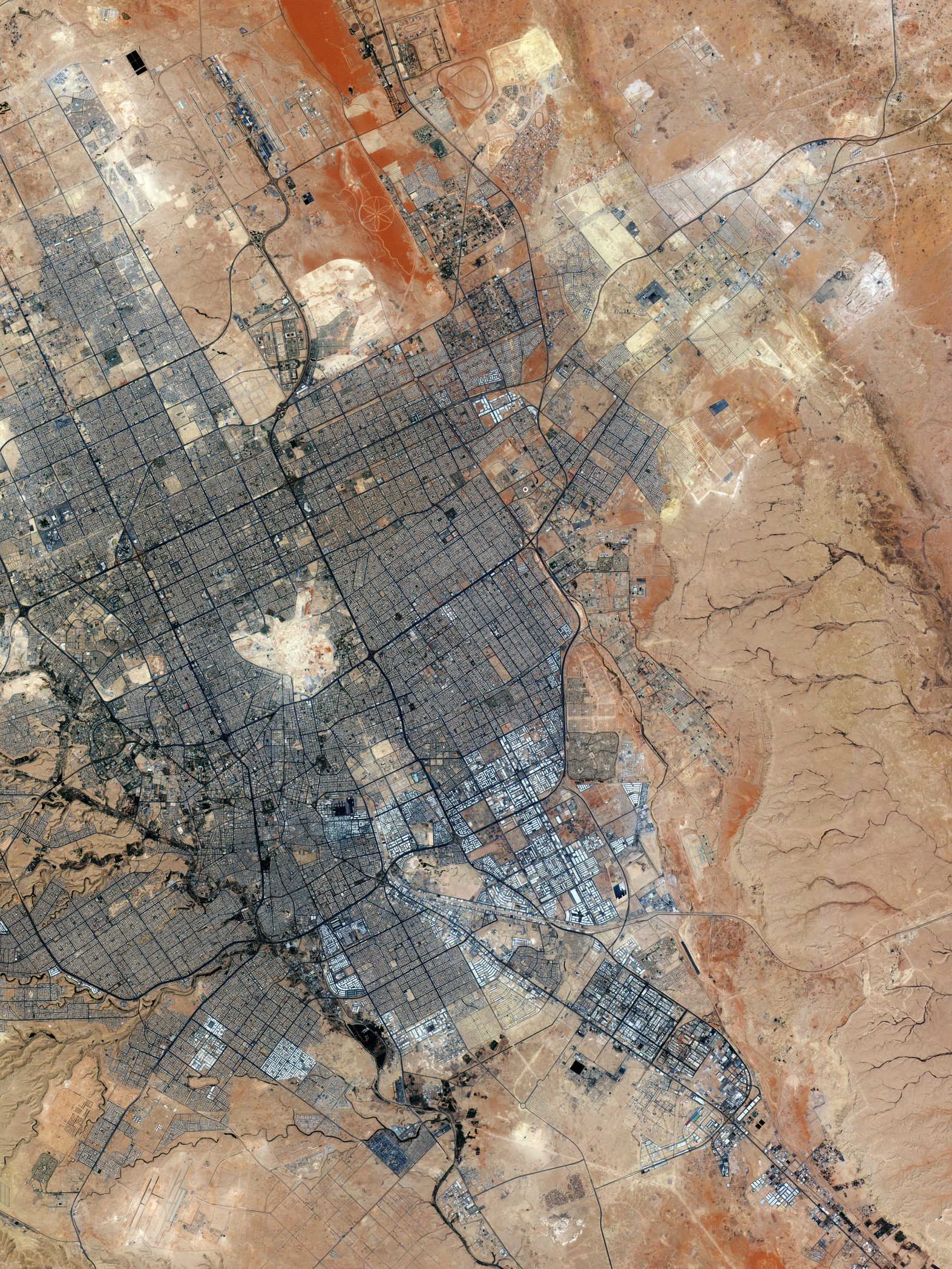
Riyadh, Saudi Arabia

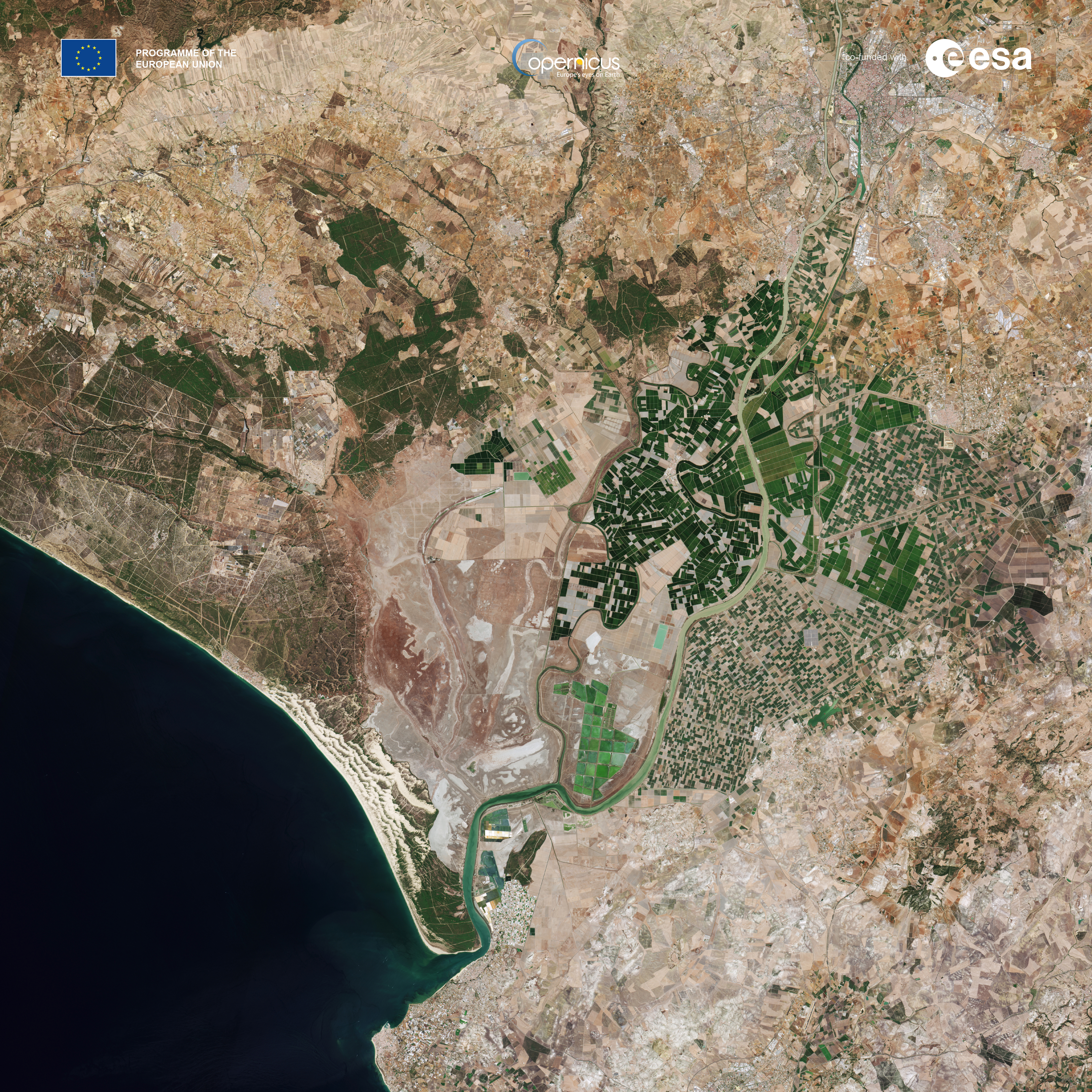
Seville, Spain

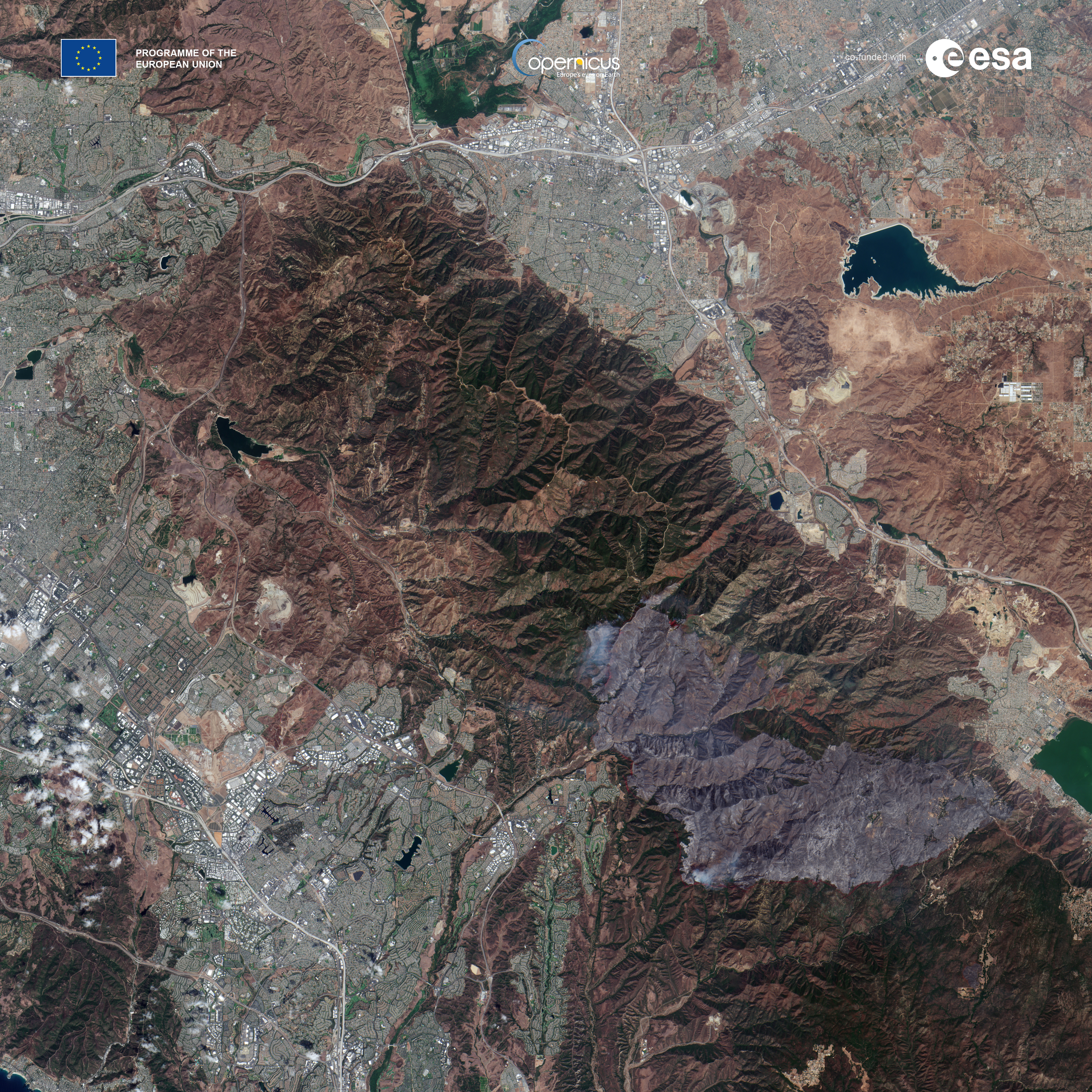
Wildfire in California

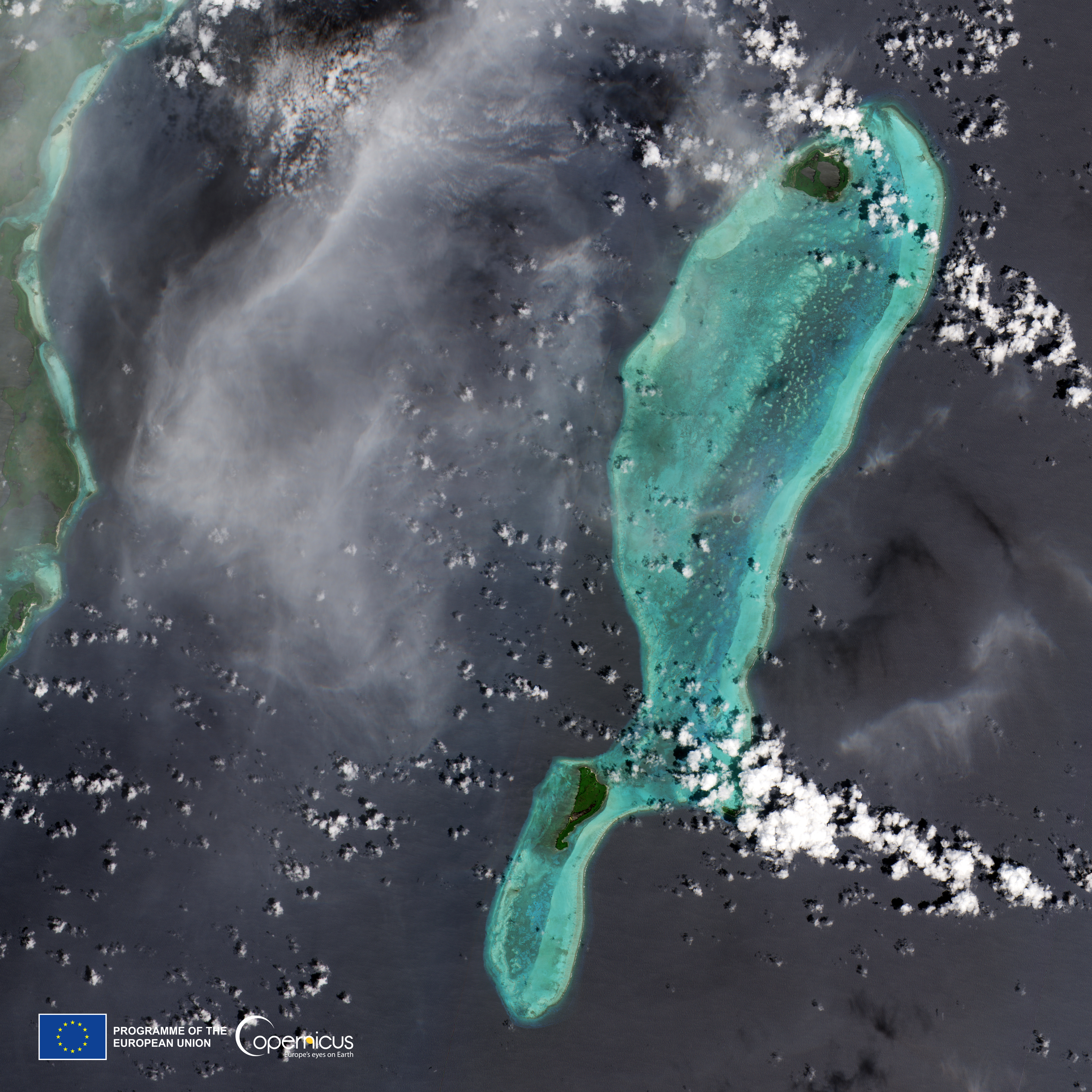
Lighthouse Reef, Belize Barrier Reef

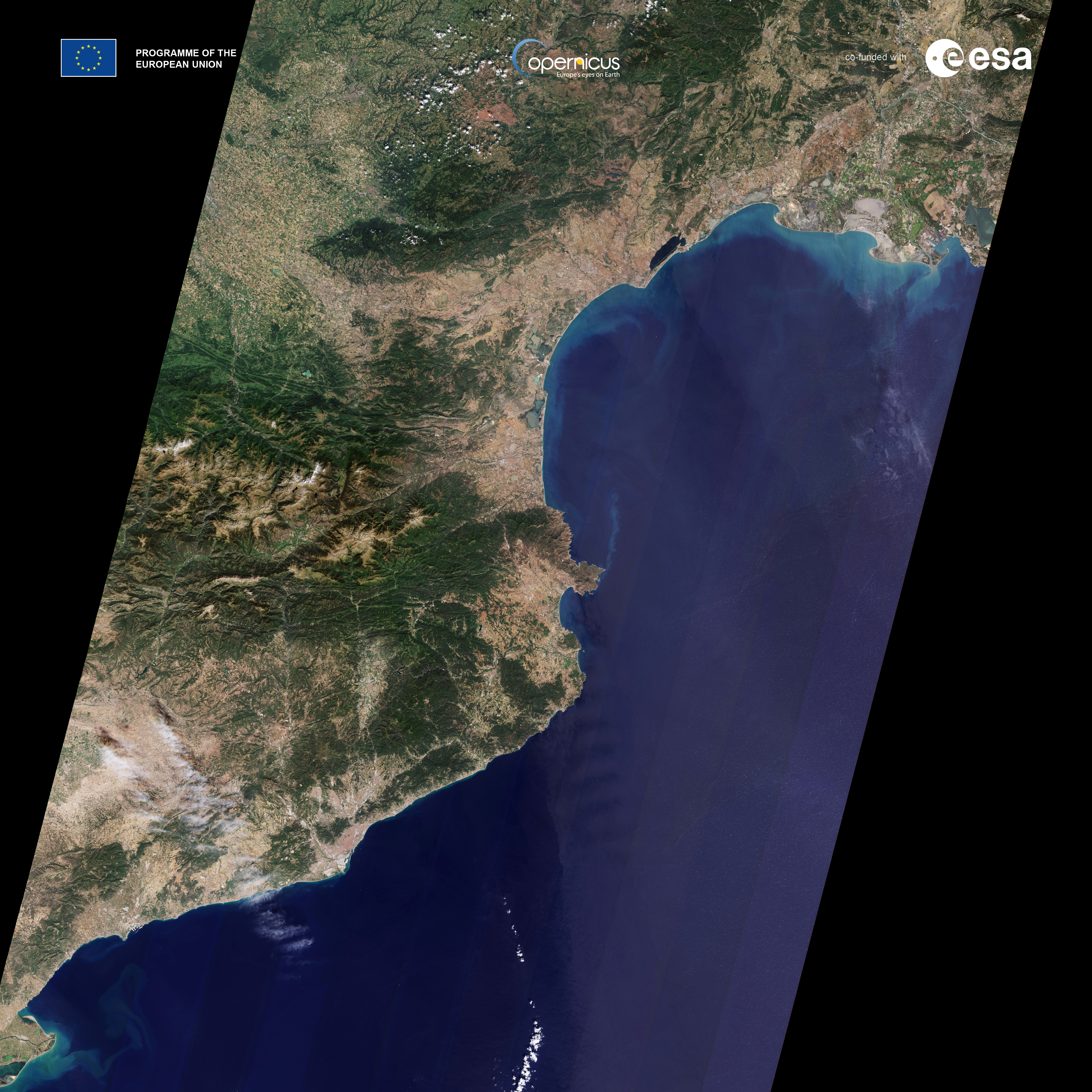
France–Spain strip

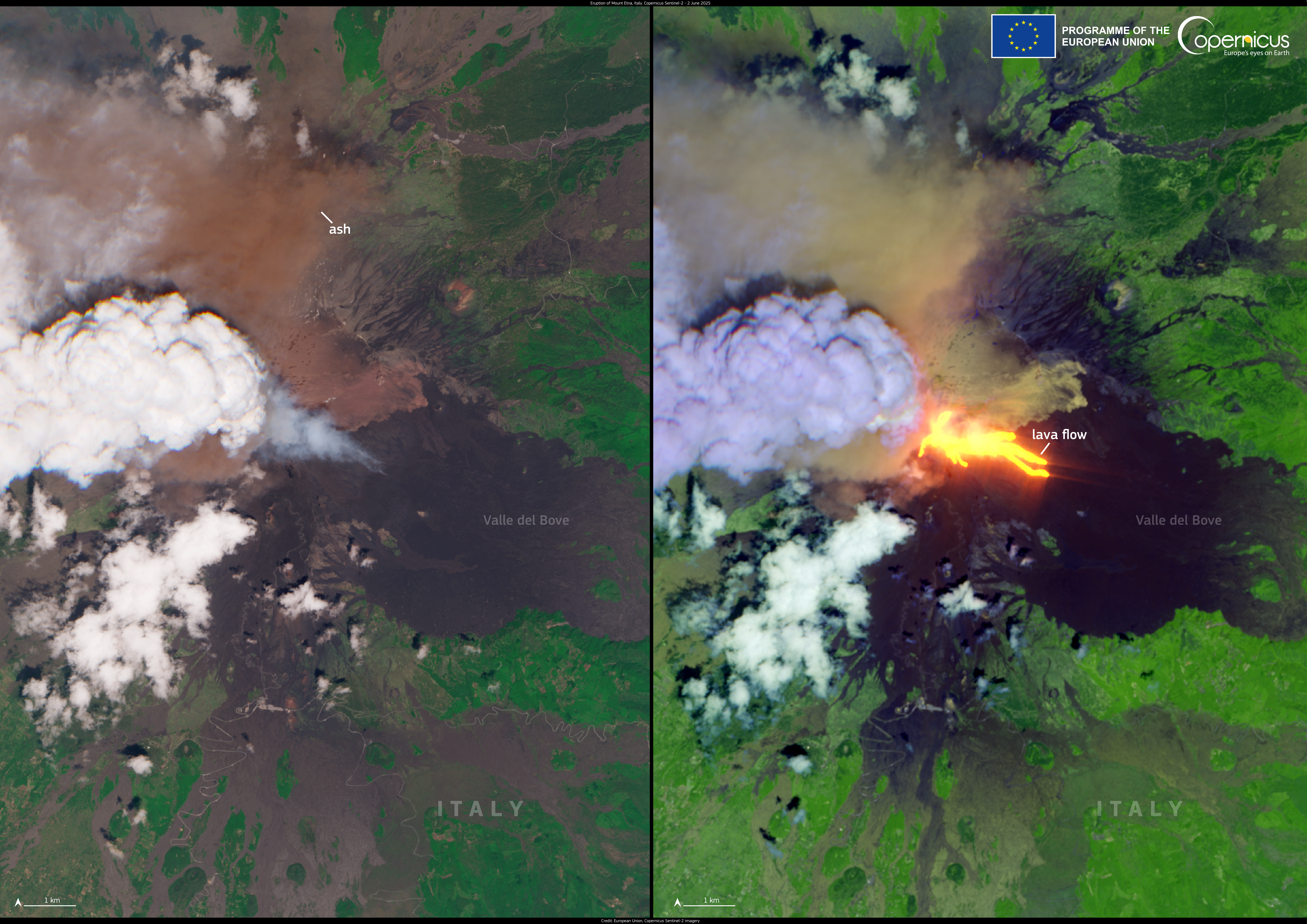
Mount Etna eruption on 2 June 2025

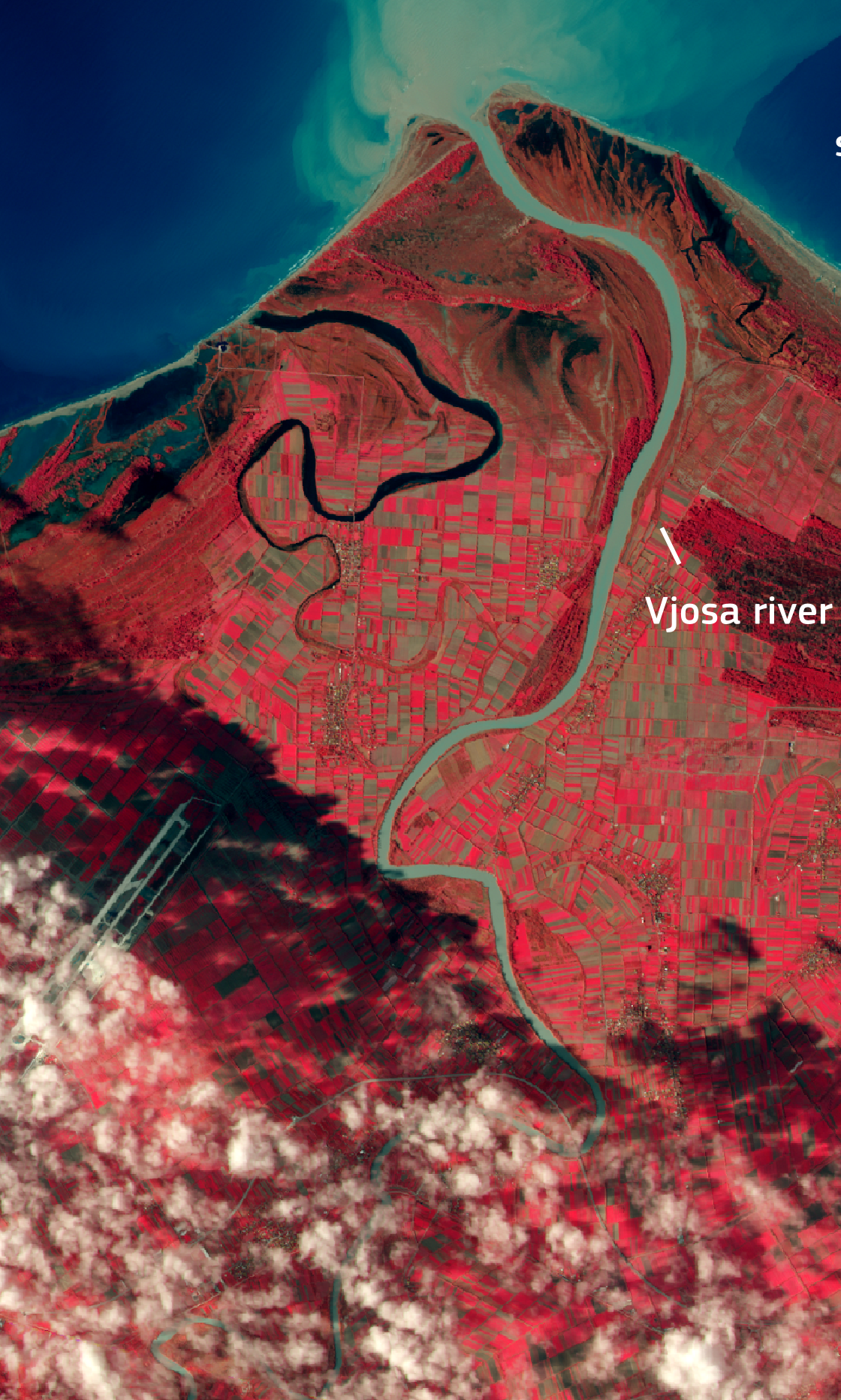
Vjosa river, Albania

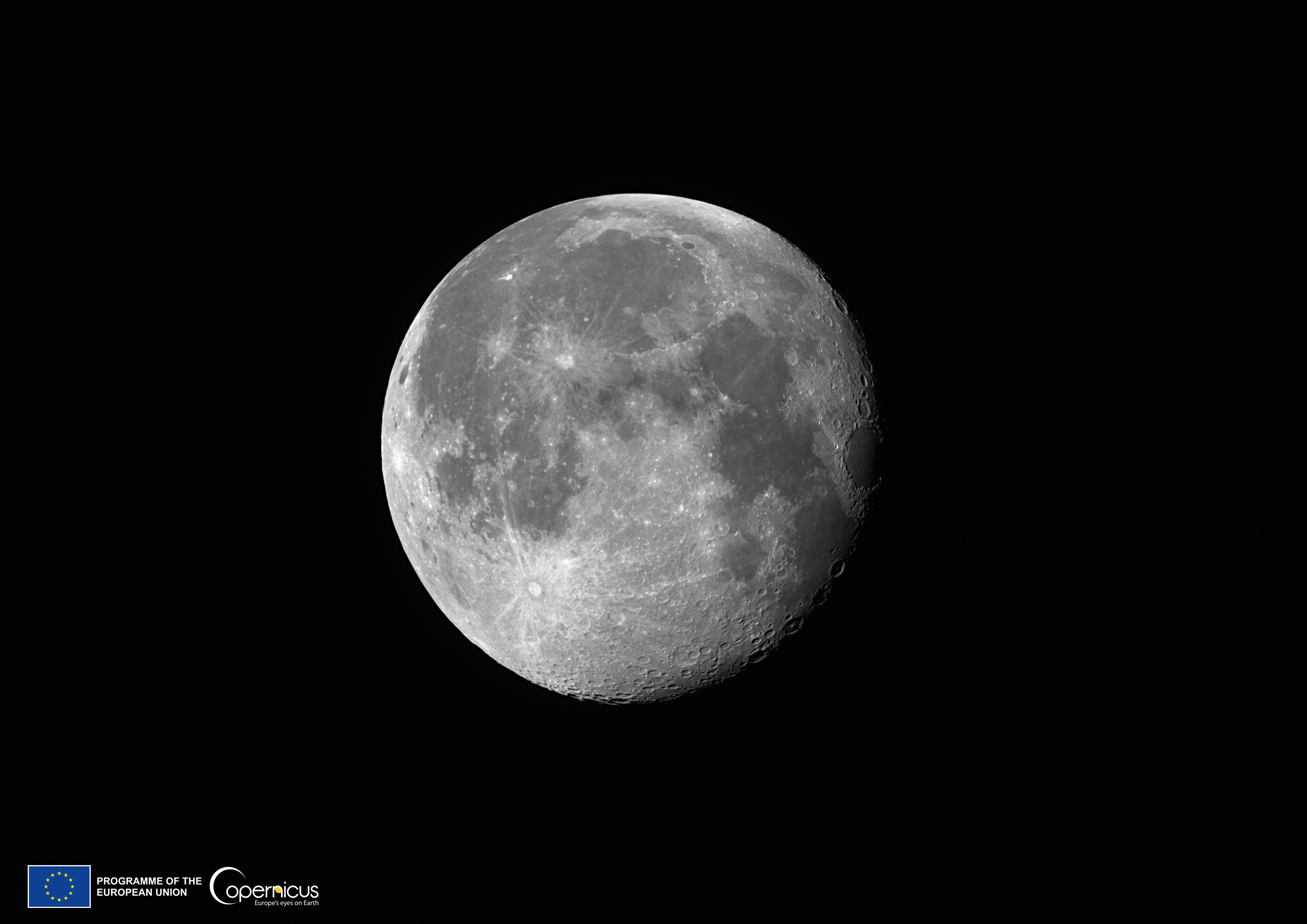
View of the Moon for calibration

== See also ==
- List of European Space Agency programmes and missions
