= Sentinel-2 =

Earth observation mission

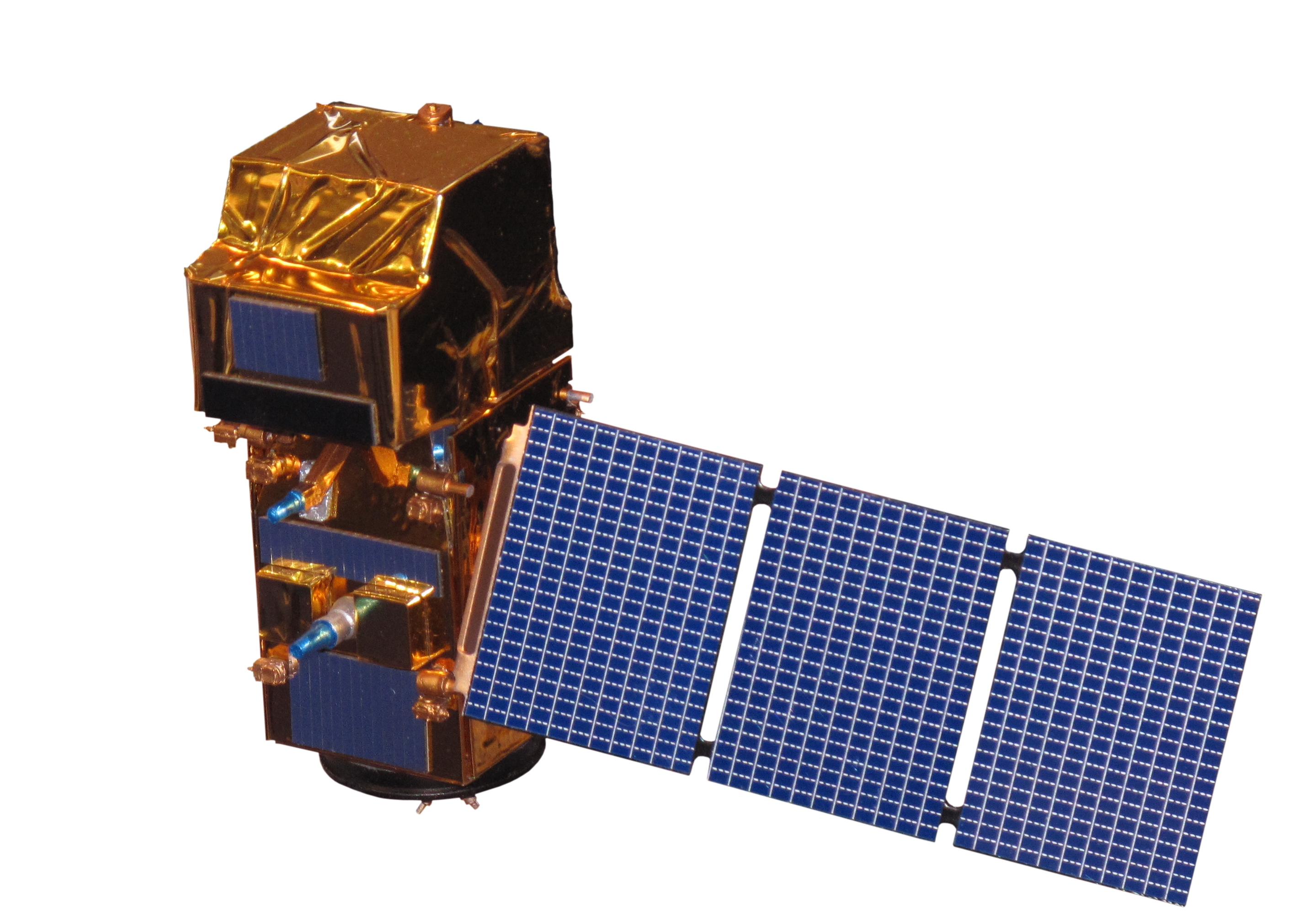
- Model of a Sentinel-2 satellite
- Manufacturer: Astrium/Airbus; Thales Alenia Space; Boostec; Jena-Optronik; SENER
- Country of origin: European Union
- Operator: European Space Agency
- Applications: Land and sea monitoring, natural disasters mapping, sea ice observations, ships detection

Specifications
- Spacecraft type: Satellite
- Bus: AstroBus-L
- Constellation: 3
- Launch mass: 1,140 kg (2,513 lb)
- Dry mass: 1,016 kg (2,240 lb)
- Dimensions: 3.4 × 1.8 × 2.35 m (11.2 × 5.9 × 7.7 ft)
- Power: 1,700 W
- Design life: 7 years

Production
- Status: Active
- On order: 1
- Built: 3
- Launched: 3
- Operational: 3
- Maiden launch: Sentinel-2A; 23 June 2015
- Last launch: Sentinel-2C; 5 September 2024

Sentinel-2 is an Earth observation mission from the Copernicus Programme that acquires optical imagery at high spatial resolution (10 m to 60 m) over land and coastal waters. The mission's Sentinel-2A and Sentinel-2B satellites were joined in orbit in 2024 by a third, Sentinel-2C, and will be in the future by Sentinel-2D, eventually replacing the A and B satellites, respectively. The mission supports services and applications such as agricultural monitoring, emergencies management, land cover classification, and water quality. Sentinel-2 has been developed and is being operated by the European Space Agency. The satellites were manufactured by a consortium led by Airbus Defence and Space in Friedrichshafen, Germany.

== Overview ==
The Sentinel-2 mission includes:

- Multi-spectral data with 13 bands in the visible, near infrared, and short wave infrared part of the spectrum
- Systematic global coverage of land surfaces from 56° S to 84° N, coastal waters, and all of the Mediterranean Sea
- Revisiting every 10 days under the same viewing angles. At high latitudes, Sentinel-2 swath overlap and some regions will be observed twice or more every 10 days, but with different viewing angles.
- Spatial resolution of 10 m, 20 m, and 60 m
- 290 km field of view
- Free and open data policy

To achieve frequent revisits and high mission availability, two identical Sentinel-2 satellites (Sentinel-2A and Sentinel-2B) operate together. The satellites are phased 180 degrees from each other on the same orbit. This allows for what would be a 10-day revisit cycle to be completed in 5 days. The 290-kilometre swath is created by the VNIR and SWIR, which are each made of 12 detectors that are lined in two offset rows.

The orbits are Sun-synchronous at 424.4 nautical miles (2,579,000 ft; 786.0 km; 488.4 mi) altitude, 14.3 revolutions per day, with a 10:30 a.m. descending node. This local time was selected as a compromise between minimizing cloud cover and ensuring suitable Sun illumination. It is close to the Landsat local time and matches SPOT's, allowing the combination of Sentinel-2 data with historical images to build long-term time series.

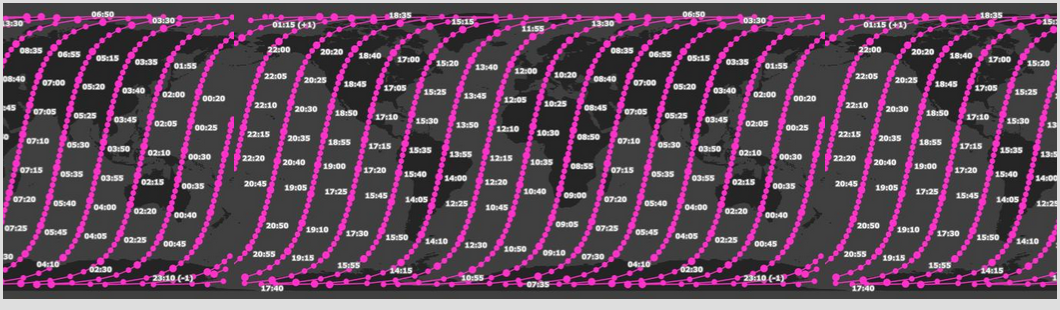
Sentinel 2A's descending orbital path

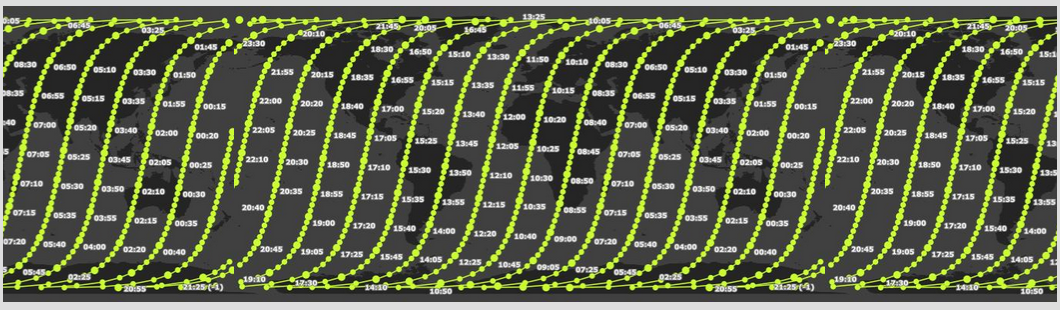
Sentinel 2B's descending orbital path

== Launches ==
The launch of the first satellite, Sentinel-2A, occurred 23 June 2015 at 01:52 UTC on a Vega launch vehicle. Sentinel-2B was launched on 7 March 2017 at 01:49 UTC, also aboard a Vega rocket. Sentinel-2C was launched on 5 September 2024 on the last Vega launch vehicle.

== Instrument ==
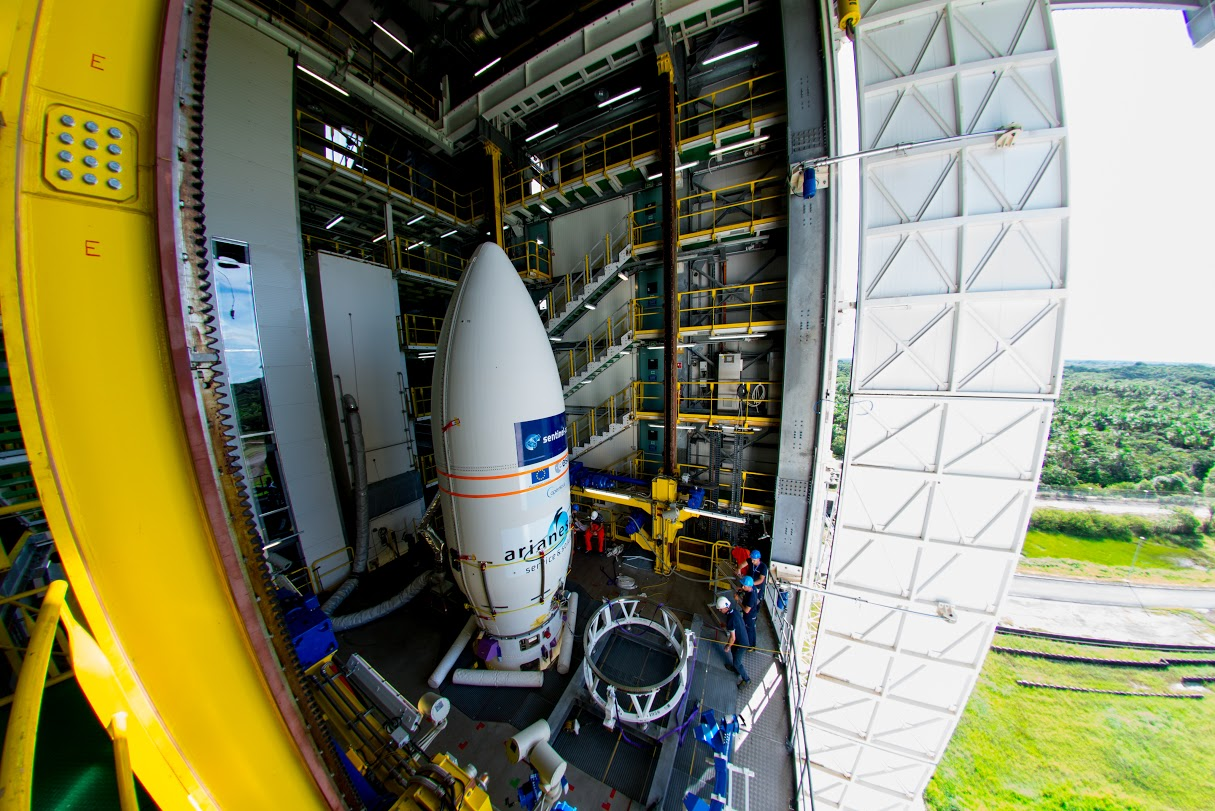
Sentinel-2A in the Vega fairing before launch in Kourou, French Guiana.

The Sentinel-2 satellites each carry a single instrument, the Multi-Spectral Instrument (MSI), which has 13 spectral channels in the visible/near infrared (VNIR) and short wave infrared spectral range (SWIR). Within the 13 bands, the 10-metre (33 ft) spatial resolution allows for continued collaboration with the SPOT-5 and Landsat-8 missions, with the core focus being land classification.

Designed and built by Airbus Defense and Space in France, the MSI uses a push-broom concept and its design was driven by the large 290-kilometre (180 mi) swath requirements together with the high geometrical and spectral performance required of the measurements. It has a 150-millimetre (6 in) aperture and a three-mirror anastigmat design with a focal length of about 600 millimetres (60 cm; 24 in); the instantaneous field of view is about 21° by 3.5°. The mirrors are rectangular and made of silicon carbide, a similar technology to those on the Gaia astrometry mission. The MSI system also employs a shutter mechanism preventing direct illumination of the instrument by the sun. This mechanism is also used in the calibration of the instrument. Out of the existing civic optical earth observation missions, Sentinel-2 is the first acquiring three bands in the red edge. MSI has 12-bit radiometric resolution (bit depth) with brightness intensity ranging from 0–4095.

=== Spectral bands ===
Spectral bands for the Sentinel-2 sensors
Sentinel-2 bands	Sentinel-2A		Sentinel-2B		
Sentinel-2 bands	Central wavelength (nm)	Bandwidth (nm)	Central wavelength (nm)	Bandwidth (nm)	Spatial resolution (m)
Band 1 – Coastal aerosol	442.7	21	442.2	21	60
Band 2 – Blue	492.4	66	492.1	66	10
Band 3 – Green	559.8	36	559.0	36	10
Band 4 – Red	664.6	31	664.9	31	10
Band 5 – Vegetation red edge	704.1	15	703.8	16	20
Band 6 – Vegetation red edge	740.5	15	739.1	15	20
Band 7 – Vegetation red edge	782.8	20	779.7	20	20
Band 8 – NIR	832.8	106	832.9	106	10
Band 8A – Narrow NIR	864.7	21	864.0	22	20
Band 9 – Water vapour	945.1	20	943.2	21	60
Band 10 – SWIR – Cirrus	1373.5	31	1376.9	30	60
Band 11 – SWIR	1613.7	91	1610.4	94	20
Band 12 – SWIR	2202.4	175	2185.7	185	20

=== Temporal offsets ===
Due to the layout of the focal plane, spectral bands within the MSI observe the surface at different times and vary between band pairs. These temporal offsets can be used to gain additional information, for example to track propagating natural and human-made features such as clouds, airplanes or ocean waves

== Applications ==
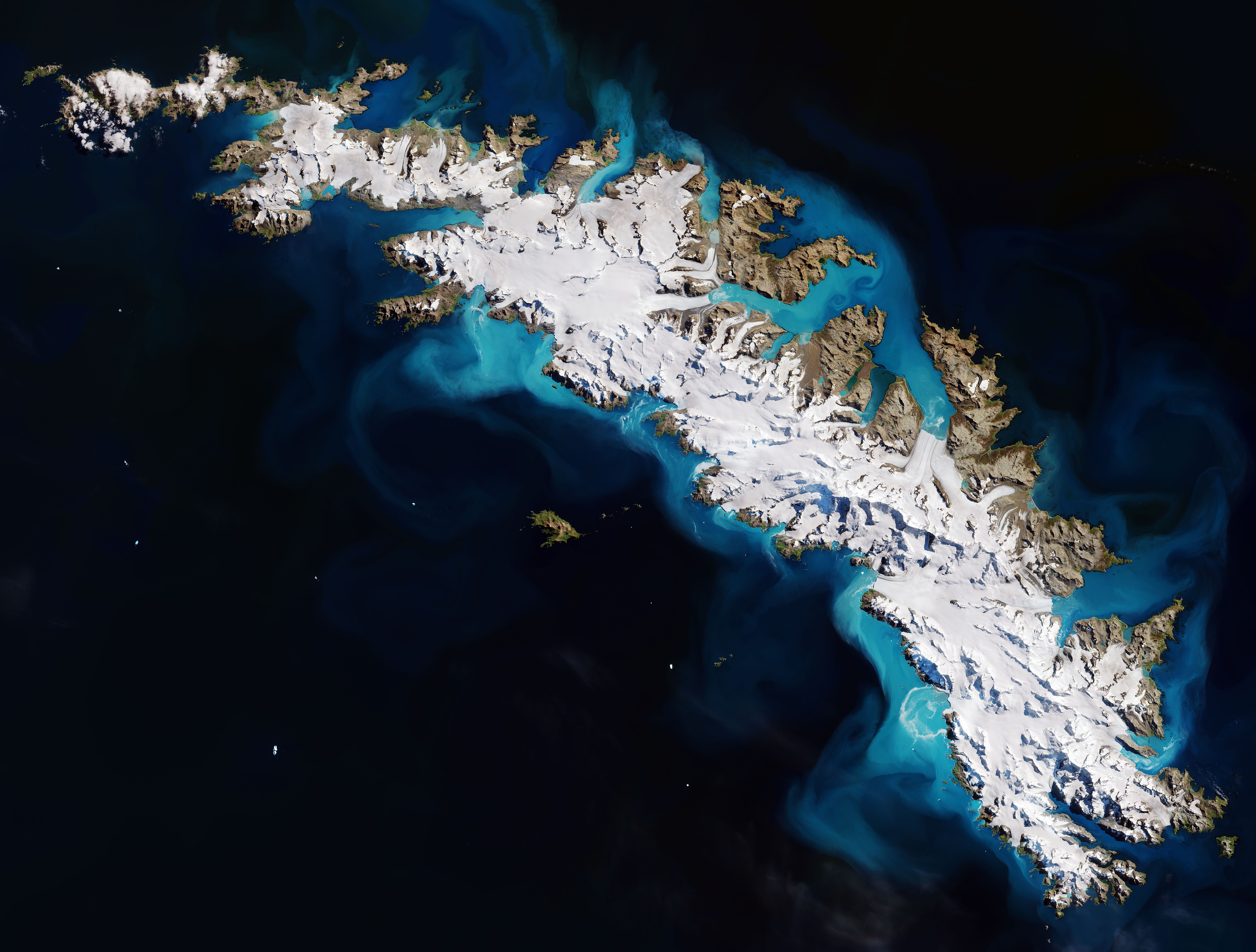
A Sentinel-2 image of the island of South Georgia

Sentinel-2 serves a wide range of applications related to Earth's land and coastal water.

The mission provides information for agricultural and forestry practices and for helping manage food security. Satellite images will be used to determine various plant indices such as leaf area chlorophyll and water content indexes. This is particularly important for effective yield prediction and applications related to Earth's vegetation.

As well as monitoring plant growth, Sentinel-2 is used to map changes in land cover and to monitor the world's forests. It also provides information on pollution in lakes and coastal waters. Images of floods, volcanic eruptions and landslides contribute to disaster mapping and help humanitarian relief efforts.

Examples of applications include:

- Monitoring land cover change for environmental monitoring
- Agricultural applications, such as crop monitoring and management to help food security
- Identification of buried archaeological sites
- Mapping of palaeo-channels through multitemporal analysis
- Detailed vegetation and forest monitoring and parameter generation (e.g. leaf area index, chlorophyll concentration, carbon mass estimations)
- Observation of coastal zones (marine environmental monitoring, coastal zone mapping)
- Inland water monitoring (Harmful Algal Blooms (HABs) monitoring and assessment)
- Glacier monitoring, ice extent mapping, snow cover monitoring
- Flood mapping & management (risk analysis, loss assessment, disaster management during floods)
- Lava flow mapping

The Sentinel Monitoring web application offers an easy way to observe and analyse land changes based on archived Sentinel-2 data.

== Products ==
The following two main products are generated by the mission:

- Level-1C: Top-of-atmosphere reflectances in cartographic geometry (combined UTM projection and WGS84 ellipsoid). Level-1C products are tiles of 100 km x 100 km each one with a volume of approximately 500 MB. These products are radiometrically and geometrically corrected (including orthorectification). This product can be obtained from the Copernicus Data Space Ecosystem. Read instructions.
- Level-2A: Surface reflectances in cartographic geometry. This product is considered the mission Analysis Ready Data (ARD), the product that can be used directly in downstream applications without the need for further processing. This product can be obtained either from the Copernicus Data Space Ecosystem (Read instructions), or generated by the user with the Sen2Cor processor from ESA's SNAP Toolbox.

Additionally, the following product for expert users is also available:

- Level-1B: Top of atmosphere radiances in sensor geometry. Level-1B is composed of granules, one granule represents the sub-image one of the 12 detectors in the across track direction (25 km), and contains a given number of lines along track (approximately 23 km). Each Level-1B granule has a data volume of approximately 27 MB. Given the complexity of Level-1B products, their usage require an advanced expertise.

== Gallery ==
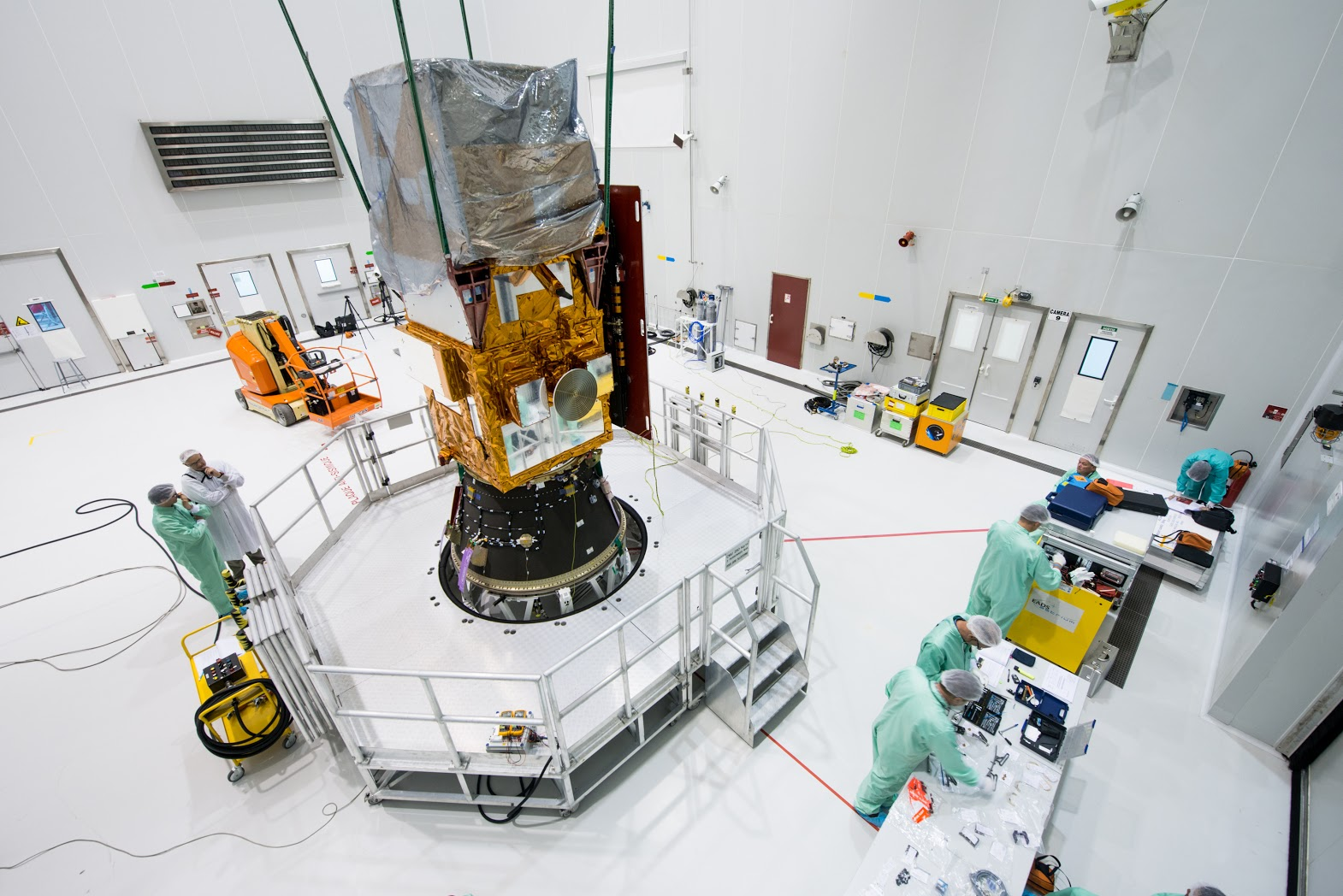
Aligning Sentinel-2A to its adapter before launch

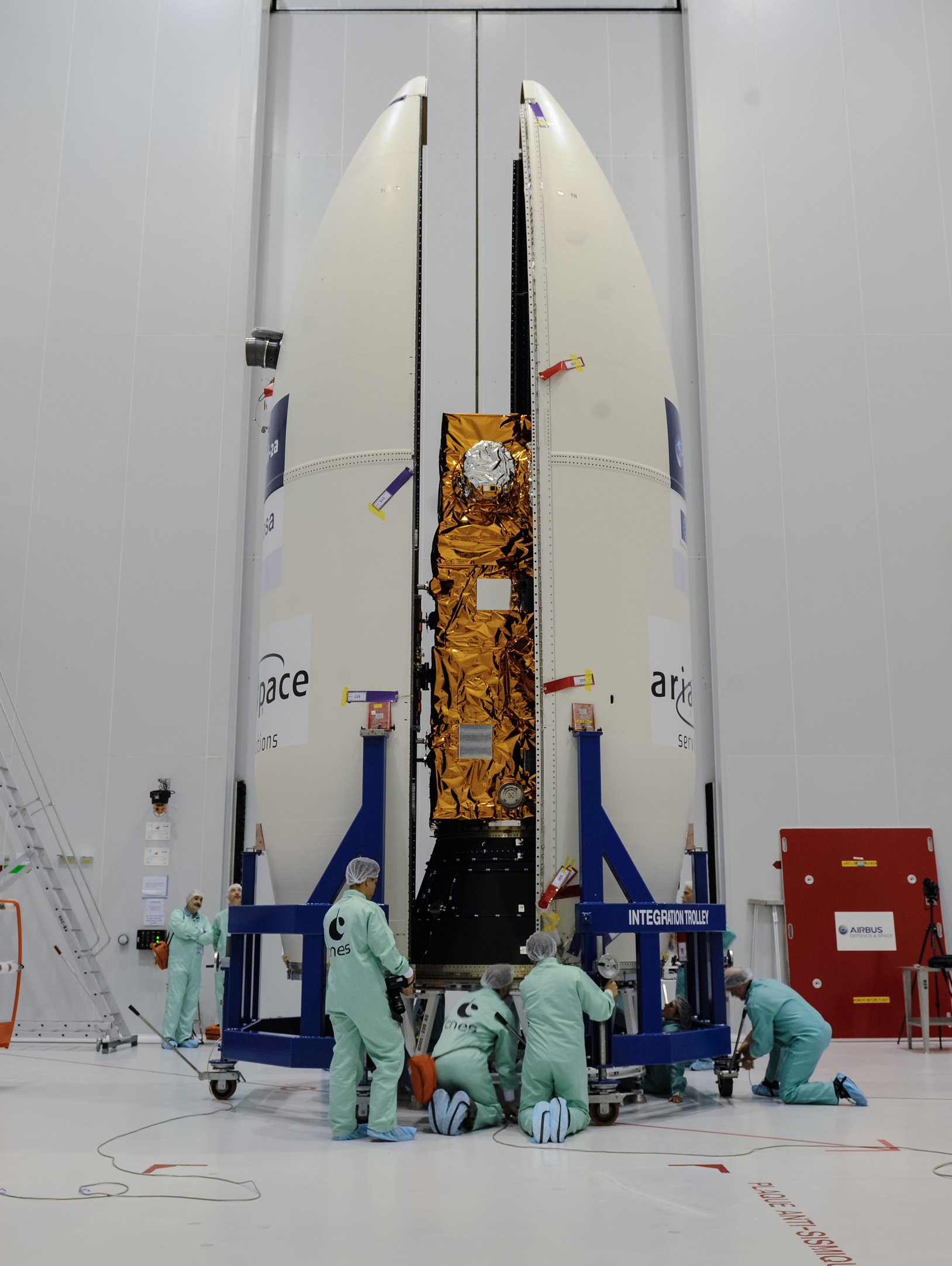
Encapsulating Sentinel-2A in the Vega rocket fairing

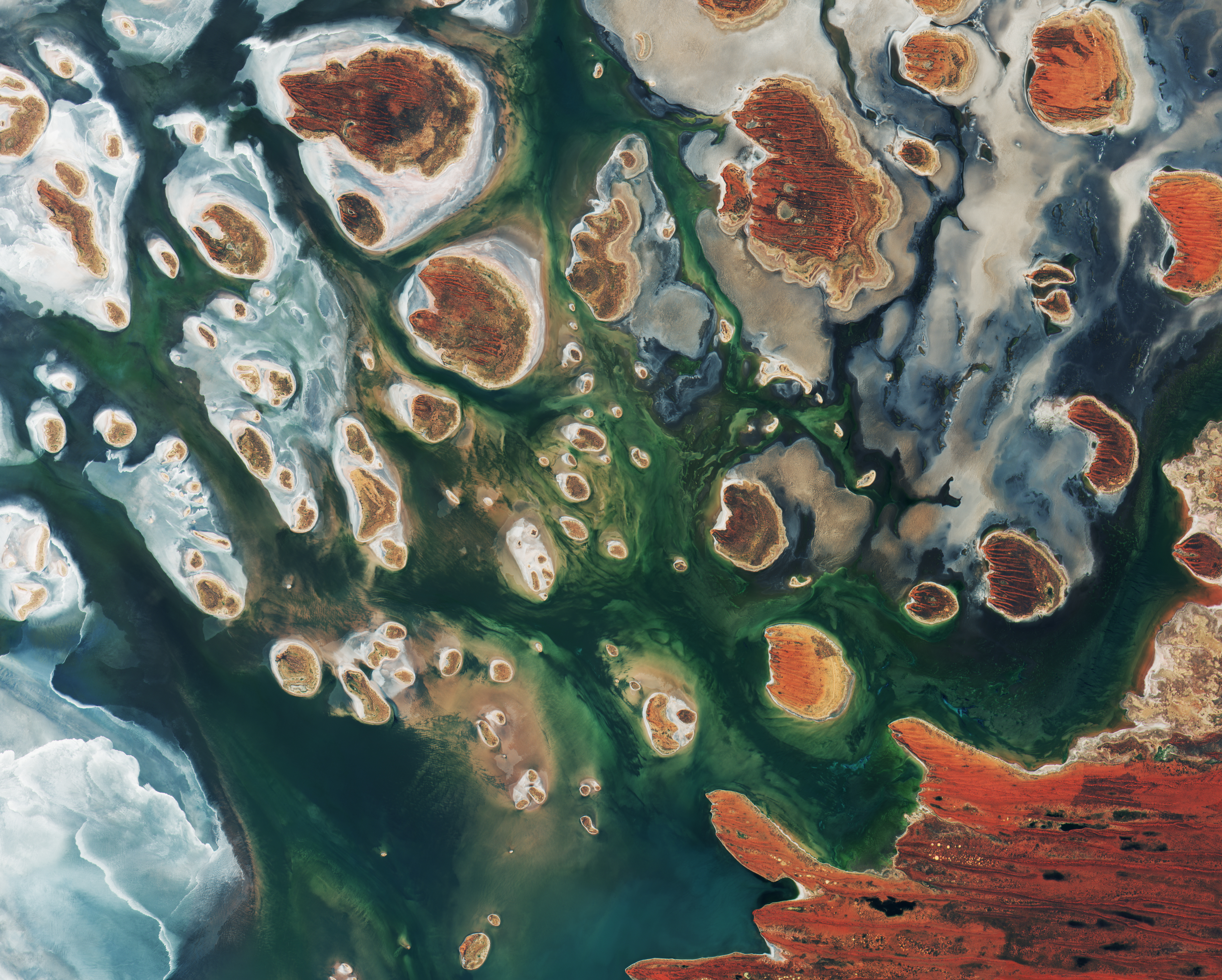
Lake Mackay, Australia by Copernicus Sentinel-2B

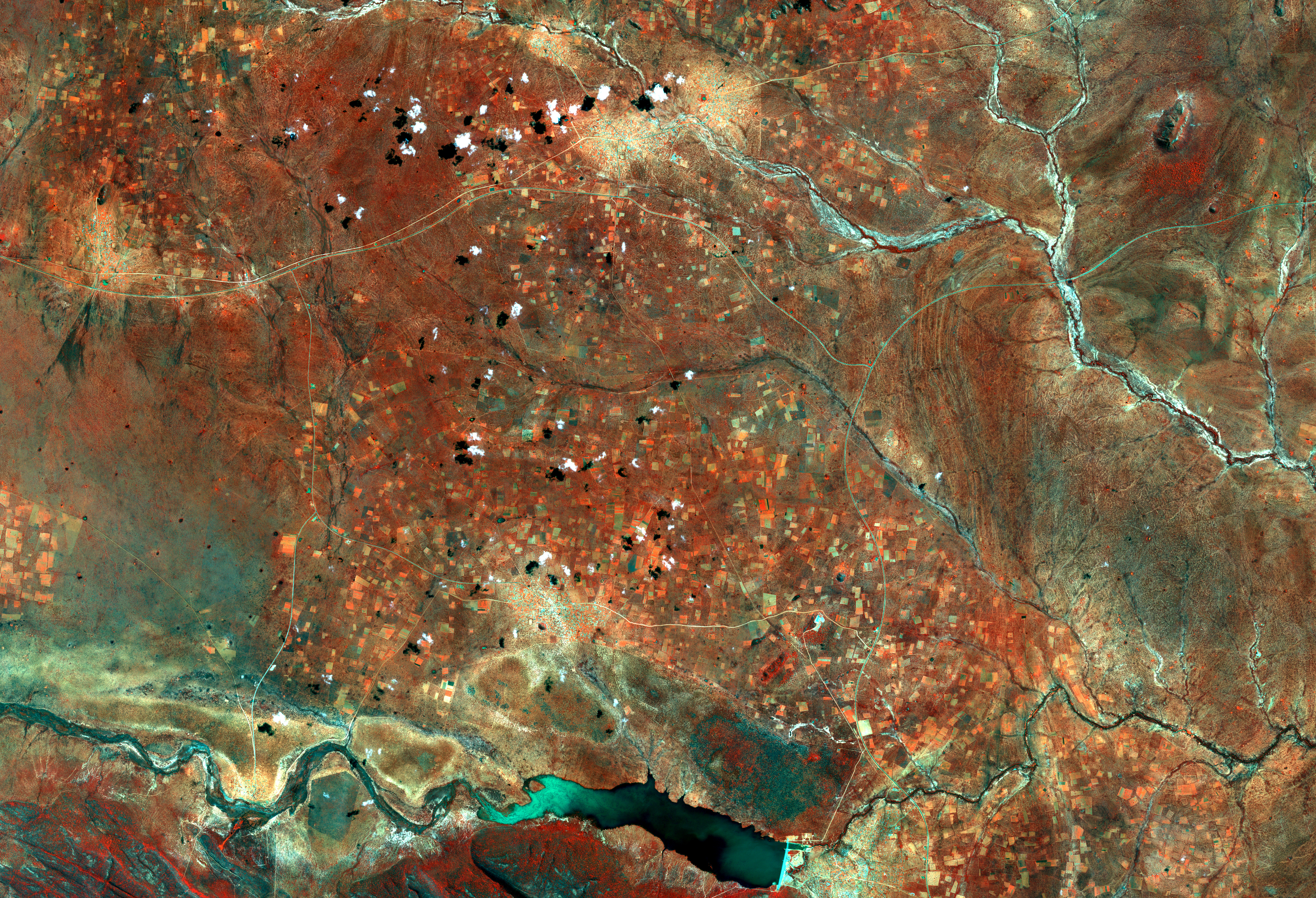
Central District, Botswana by Copernicus Sentinel-2A

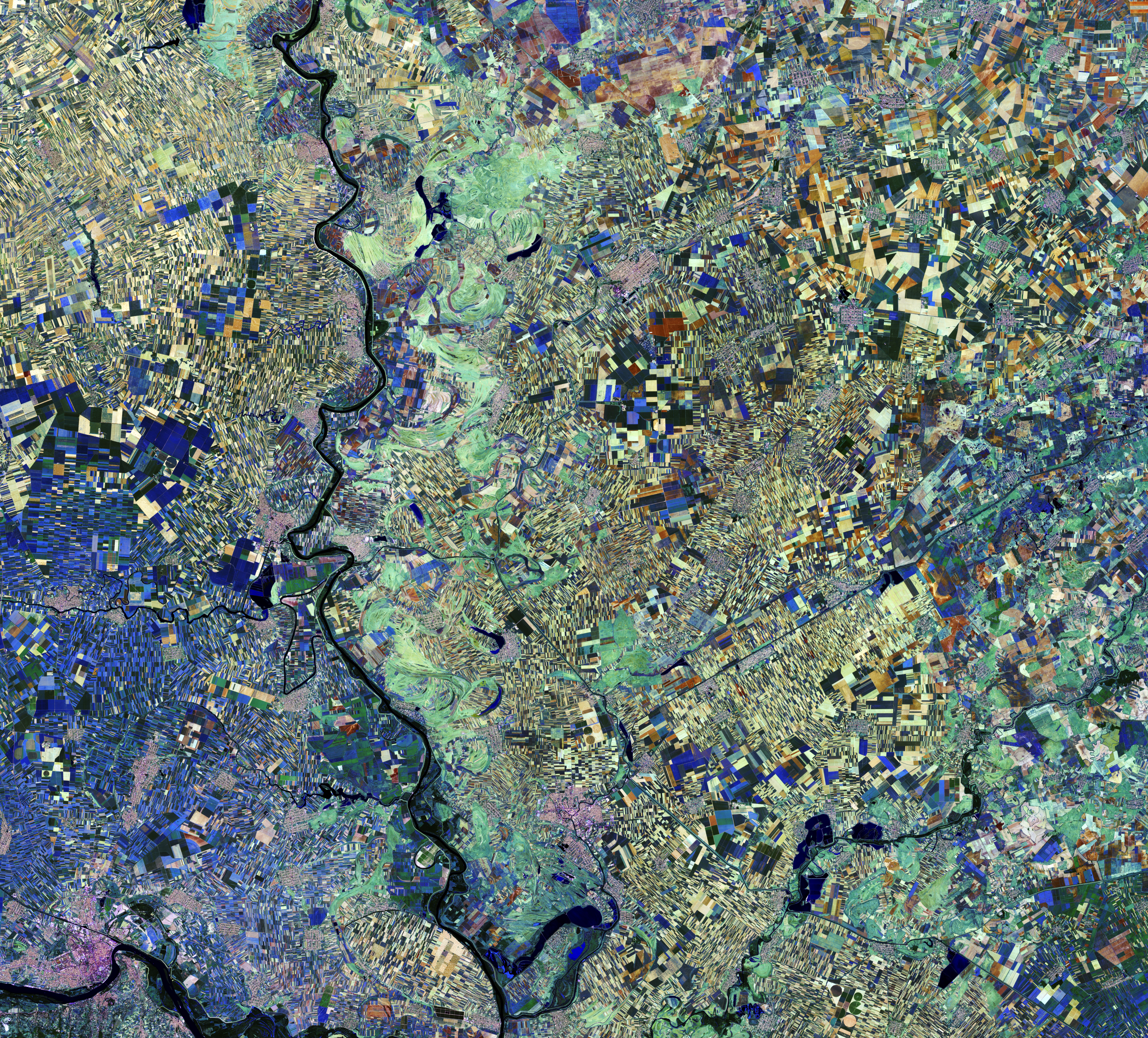
Vojvodina, Serbia by Copernicus Sentinel-2A

Central-eastern Brazil, by Copernicus Sentinel-2A

Lake Balaton, Hungary

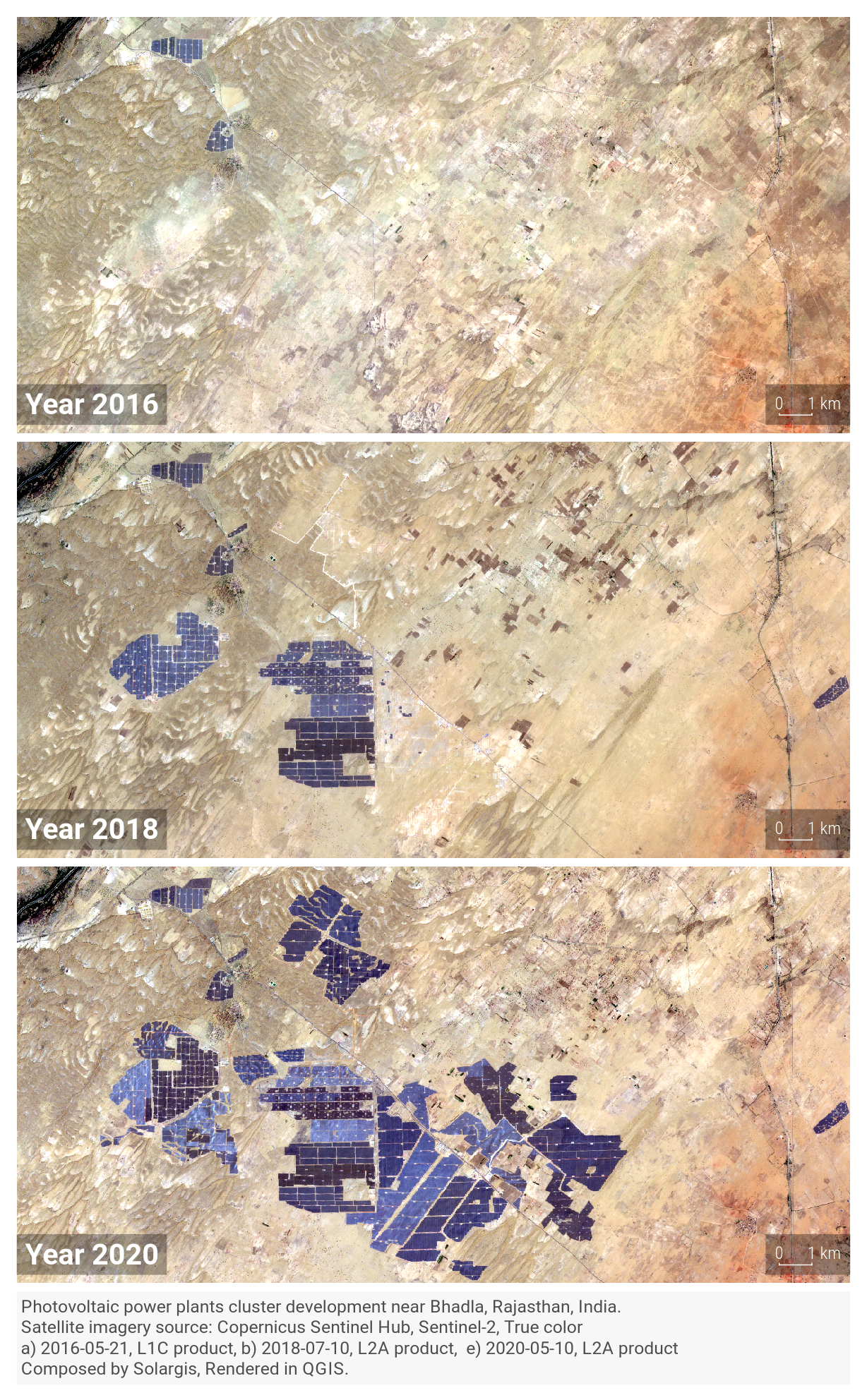
Timeline of the Bhadla Solar Park (India) development, the world's largest photovoltaic power plants cluster in 2020

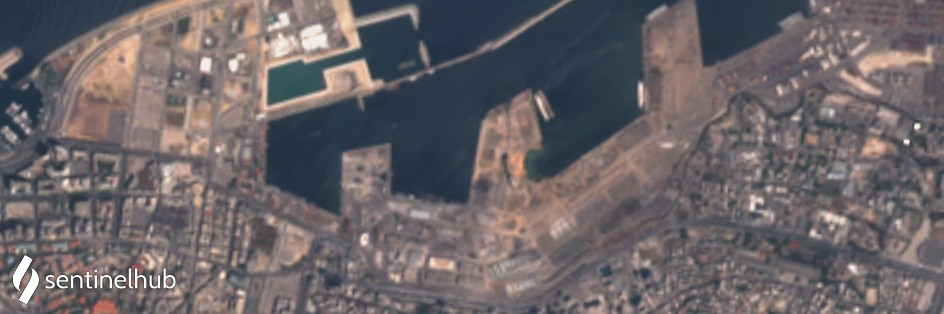
The Port of Beirut as seen from Sentinel-2 after the August 4, 2020 explosion that decimated much of Beirut, Lebanon

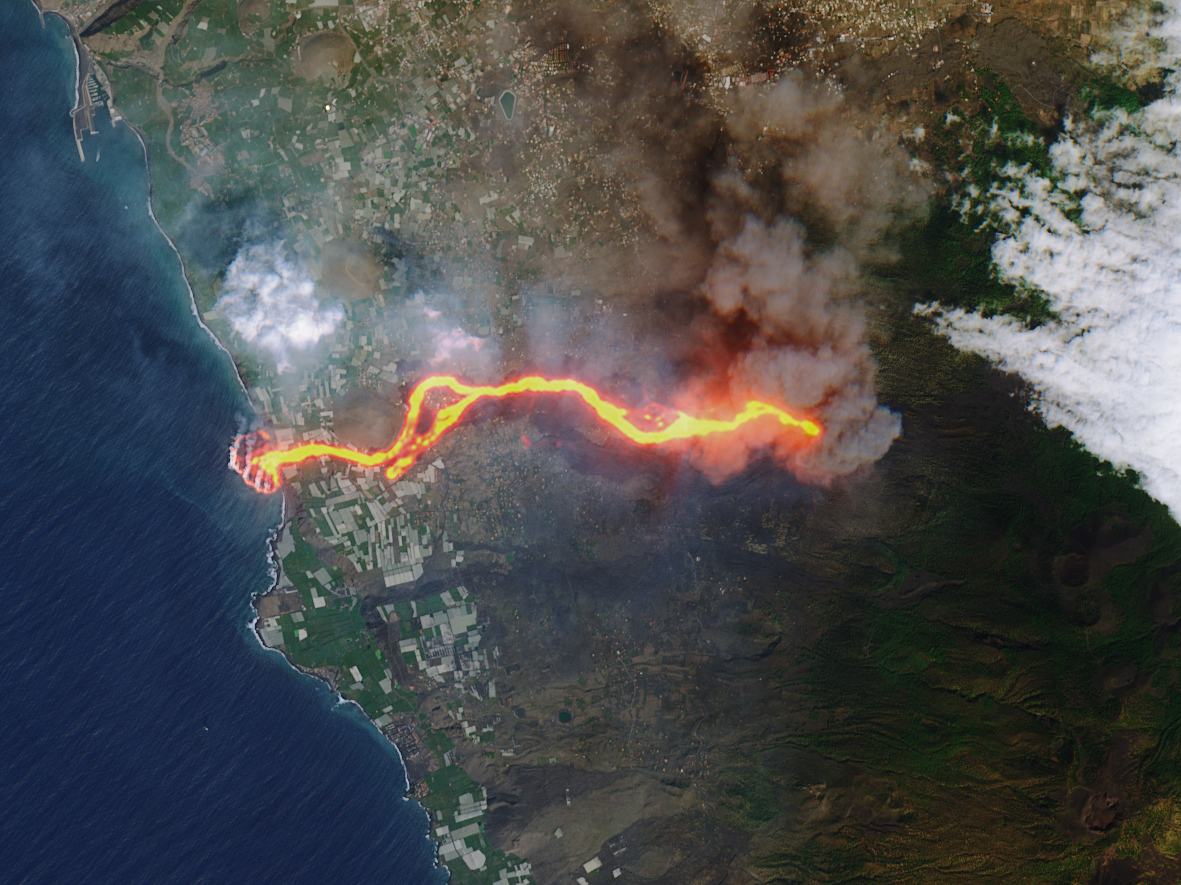
Sentinel-2 photograph of the area covered by the 2021 Cumbre Vieja volcanic eruption flow on Monday afternoon 20 September 2021

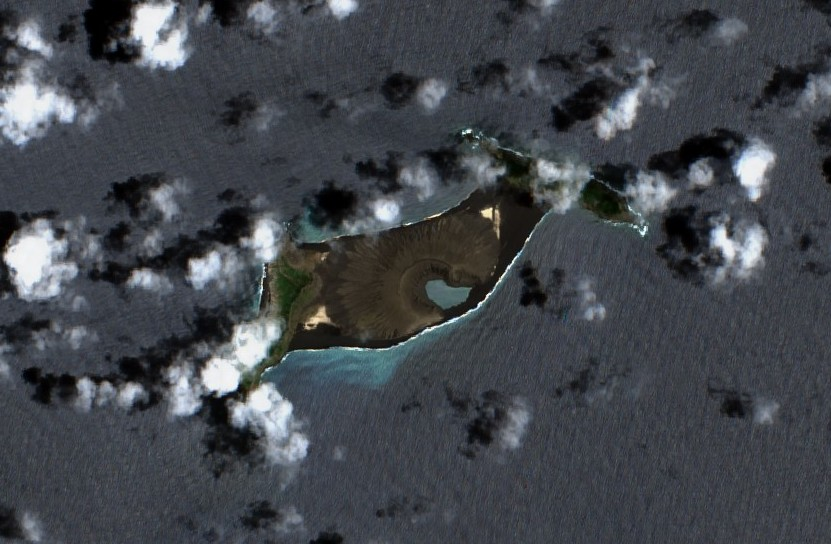
Sentinel-2 image of Hunga Tonga–Hunga Haʻapai island on 20 December 2021 (the only major subaerial part of the volcano) formed a single island from 2015 to 2022

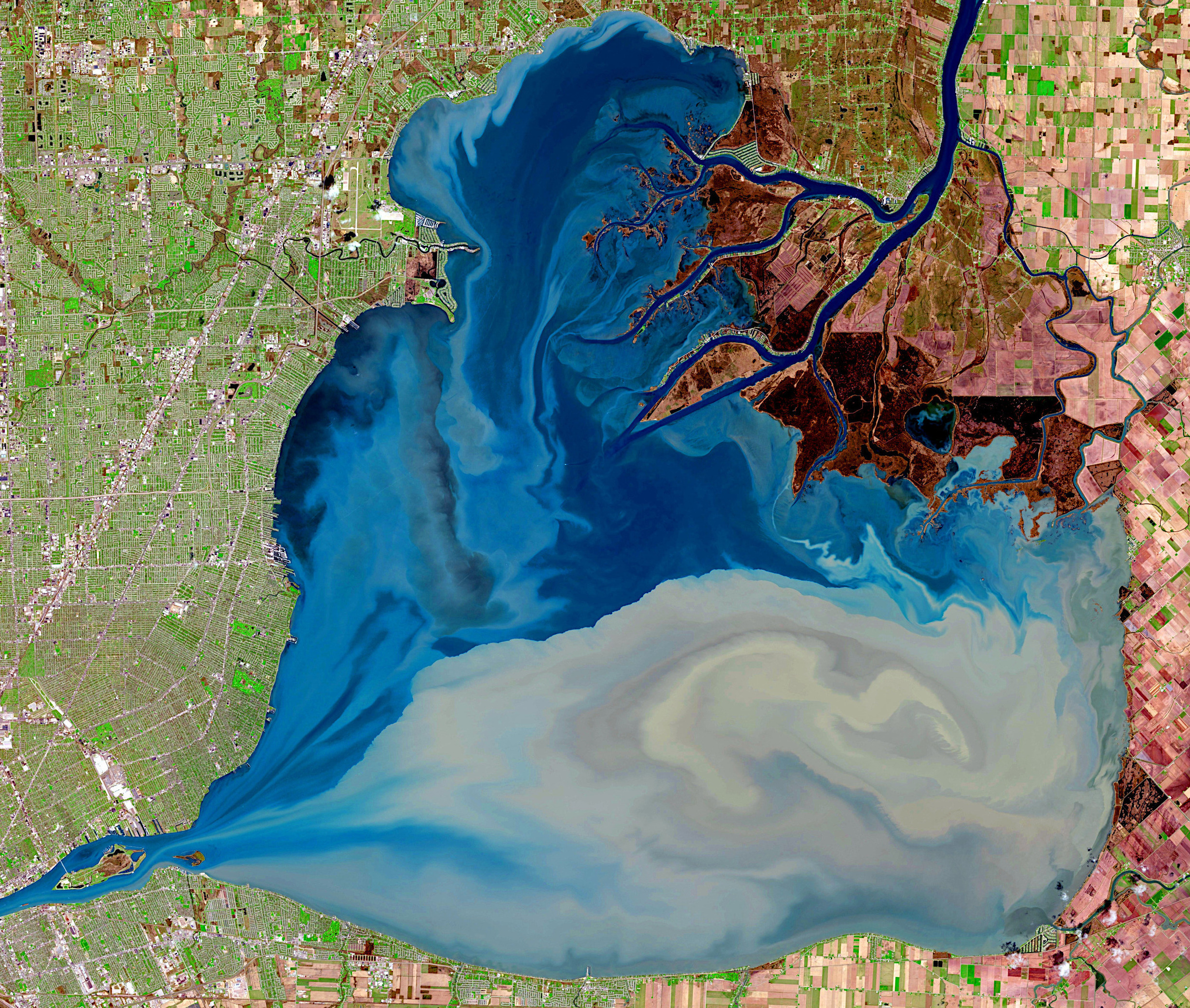
An image of Lake St. Clair from April 19, 2023
