= Zefiro (rocket stage) =

Family of European solid-fuel rocket motors

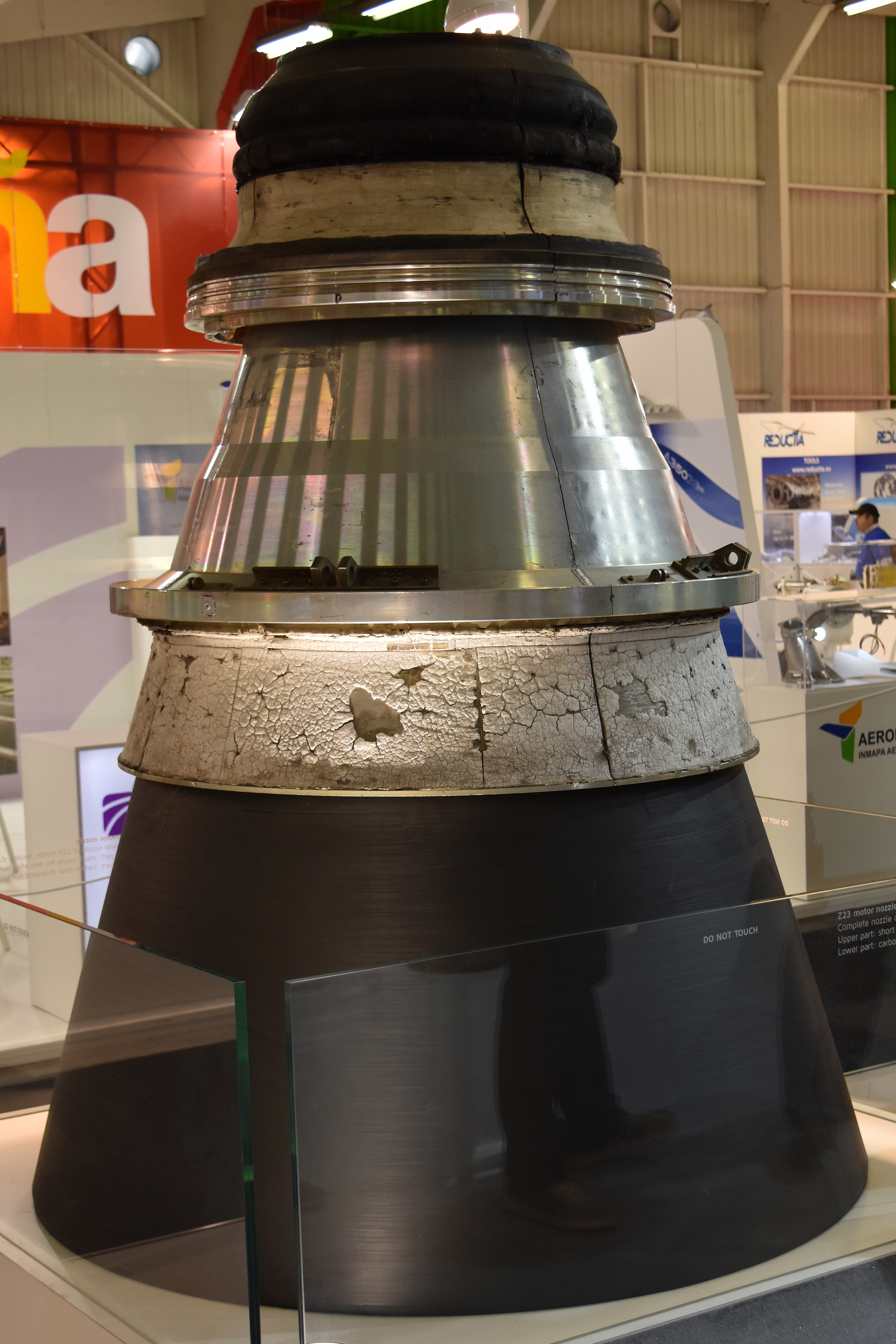
- Nozzle of the Zefiro 23, Paris Air Show 2015
- Manufacturer: Avio
- Country of origin: Italy
- Used on: Current: Vega C; Retired: Vega; Future: Vega E

Launch history
- Status: Active
- Total launches: 23
- Successes (stage only): 21
- Failed: 2
- First flight: 13 February 2012
- Last flight: 11 July 2019

Second stage (Vega) – Zefiro 23
- Height: 8.39 m (27 ft 6 in)
- Diameter: 1.9 m (6 ft 3 in)
- Empty mass: 2,486 kg (5,481 lb)
- Gross mass: 26,300 kg (58,000 lb)
- Propellant mass: 23,814 kg (52,501 lb)
- Maximum thrust: 1,120 kN (250,000 lb_{f})
- Specific impulse: 287.5 s (2.819 km/s)
- Burn time: 77.1 seconds
- Propellant: AP / Al–HTPB (1912 APCP)

Second stage (Vega C / Vega E) – Zefiro 40
- Height: 8.07 m (26 ft 6 in)
- Diameter: 2.4 m (7 ft 10 in)
- Gross mass: 40,477 kg (89,237 lb)
- Propellant mass: 36,239 kg (79,893 lb)
- Maximum thrust: 1,304 kN (293,000 lb_{f})
- Specific impulse: 293.5 s (2.878 km/s)
- Burn time: 92.9 seconds
- Propellant: AP / Al–HTPB

Third stage (Vega / Vega C) – Zefiro 9
- Height: 4.12 m (13.5 ft)
- Diameter: 1.9 m (6 ft 3 in)
- Empty mass: 1,315 kg (2,899 lb)
- Gross mass: 12,000 kg (26,000 lb)
- Propellant mass: 10,567 kg (23,296 lb)
- Maximum thrust: 317 kN (71,000 lb_{f})
- Specific impulse: 295.9 s (2.902 km/s)
- Burn time: 119.6 seconds
- Propellant: AP / Al–HTPB (HTPB 1912 APCP)

Zefiro is a family of solid-fuel rocket motors developed by Avio and used on its Vega rocket series. The name Zefiro derives from the acronym "ZEro FIrst stage ROcket", chosen when the motor was intended for use as the first and second stages of the San Marco programme of the Italian Space Agency (ASI). The name is also the Italian spelling of Zephyrus, the Greek god of the west wind.

As of 2026, the Zefiro 40 second stage and Zefiro 9 third stage are used on the Vega C rocket. The Zefiro 23 second stage, which powered the original Vega, is no longer in production. The numbers refer to the propellant mass in tonnes. However, because the designations were assigned early in development, the final propellant load is different.

== History ==
The first engine completed was Zefiro 9, the third stage engine. The first test firing was carried out on 20 December 2005, at the Salto di Quirra Inter-force Test Range, on the Mediterranean coast in southeast Sardinia. The test was a complete success. After a critical design review based on the completed first test firings, the second test-firing of the Zefiro 9 took place at Salto di Quirra on 28 March 2007. After 35 seconds, there was a sudden drop in the motor's internal pressure, leading to an increased combustion time. On 23 October 2008, an enhanced version of the Zefiro 9 with a modified nozzle design and increased propellant load, the Zefiro 9A, was successfully tested. On 28 April 2009, the final qualification test firing of Zefiro 9A took place at the Salto di Quirra Interforce Test Range in Sardinia, Italy.

The Zefiro 23 was test fired twice on 26 June 2006 and 27 March 2008 at Salto di Quirra. Both tests were successful and the motor qualified for use on Vega.

Zefiro 40 first test occurred on 8 March 2018 also at Salto di Quirra with a successful 92 seconds burn.

A failure of the Zefiro 23 occurred shortly after the planned ignition during the FalconEye 1 mission on 11 July 2019 which resulted in the loss of the satellite and a mission failure. The Zefiro 23 was supposed to fire for 77 seconds. Telemetry data showed the Vega rocket achieved a top speed of approximately 2.17 km/s, 233 seconds into flight. The rocket then deviated below its planned ascent trajectory before falling into the Atlantic Ocean north of the Centre Spatial Guyanais.

A failure of a Zefiro-40 second stage occurred on 20 December 2022, reported as under-pressure issues at launch.

== Overview ==
The propellant of all Zefiro models is HTPB 1912 with a nominal composition of 19% of aluminium powder, 69% of ammonium perchlorate with 12% of hydroxyl-terminated polybutadiene binder.

Zefiro 23 and Zefiro 9A, where the number represent the intended propellant weight at design phase, are used respectively as second and third stage of Vega rockets. Both motors have a 1.9 m diameter carbon epoxy filament wound case, a low density EPDM insulation, a flexible rocket nozzle joint and an electromechanical thrust vector control system.

Zefiro 23 is 7.5 meters tall and weighs 26 tonnes, of which 24 tonnes consist of solid propellant. It has a nominal burn time of 103 seconds with combustion chamber pressure of 95 bars.

Zefiro 9A, designed and built exclusively with Avio technologies, is 3.5 metres tall, weighs 11.5 tonnes and burns 9 tonnes of solid propellant. It has a nominal burn time of 77 seconds with combustion chamber pressure of 95 bars, consumed in slightly more than 110 seconds.

Zefiro 40 is used as second stage of Vega-C and is intended to be used with the Vega-E. In comparison to its predecessor Zefiro 23, the motor has an increased exercise pression, better structural load margins for both the casing and the propellant grains and an improved flexible rocket nozzle joint.

== See also ==
- P80 (rocket stage)
- Solid rocket
- Vega (rocket)
