= Sentinel-2B =

European optical imaging satellite

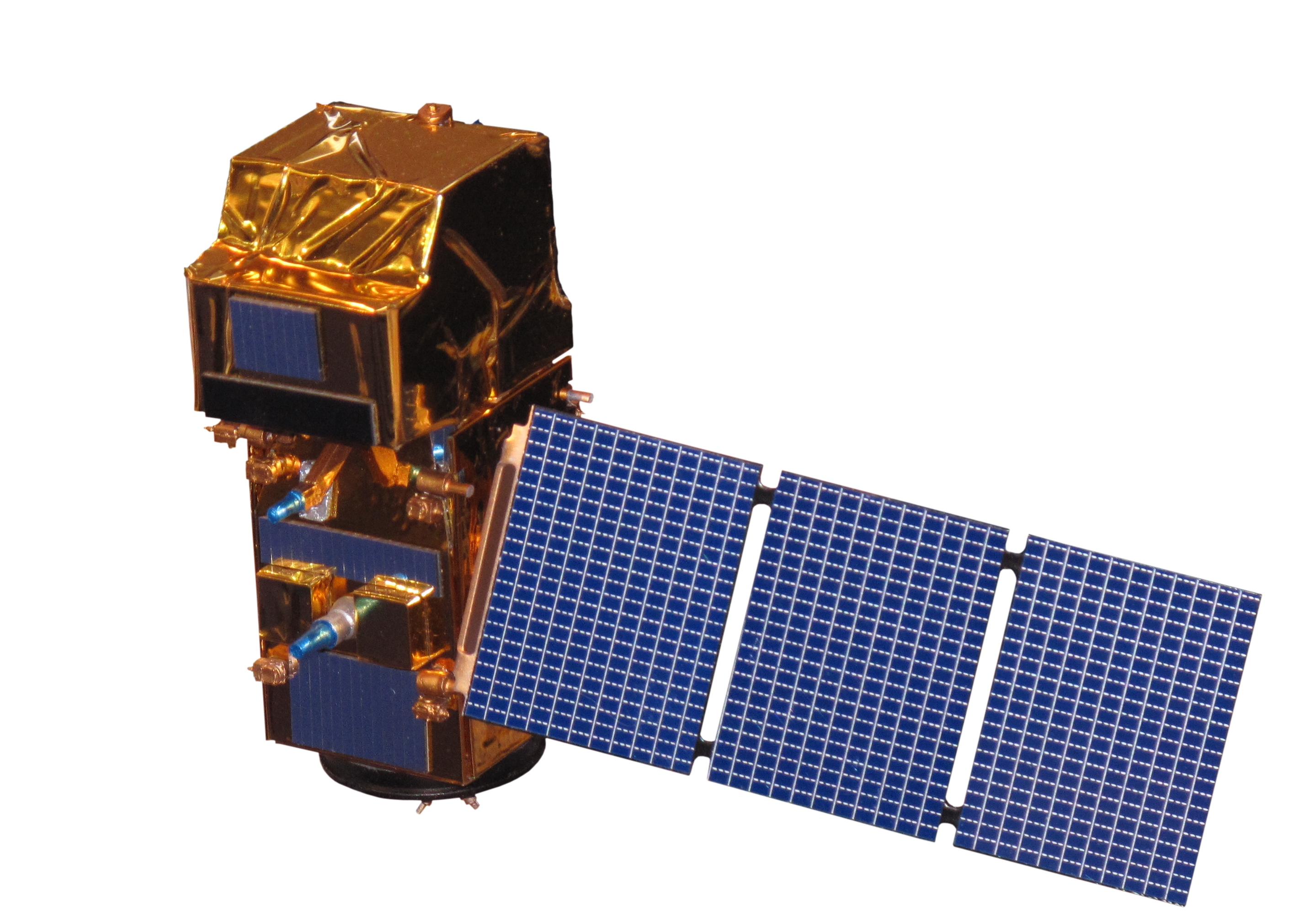
- Model of a Sentinel 2 satellite
- Mission type: Earth observation
- Operator: European Space Agency (ESA)
- COSPAR ID: 2017-013A
- SATCAT no.: 42063
- Website: Sentinel-2 (ESA)
- Mission duration: 7 years (planned); 9 years, 2 months, 7 days (elapsed)

Spacecraft properties
- Spacecraft type: Sentinel-2
- Manufacturer: Airbus Defence and Space
- Launch mass: 1,140 kilograms (2,510 lb)
- Dry mass: 1,017 kilograms (2,242 lb)
- Dimensions: 3.4 by 1.8 by 2.35 metres (11.2 ft × 5.9 ft × 7.7 ft)
- Power: 1700 watts

Start of mission
- Launch date: 7 March 2017, 01:49:24 UTC
- Rocket: Vega (VV-09)
- Launch site: Kourou, SLV
- Contractor: Arianespace

Orbital parameters
- Reference system: Geocentric orbit
- Regime: Low Earth orbit
- Altitude: 780 km
- Inclination: 98.56°
- Period: 100.45 minutes

Transponders
- Band: S-band (TT&C support), X-band and optical laser through European Data Relay System (EDRS) (data acquisition)
- Bandwidth: 64 kbit/s upload (S-band), 128 kbit/s - 2 Mbit/s download (S-band), 520 Mbit/s download (X-band / Optical)

Instruments
- Multi-Spectral Imager (MSI)

Sentinel-2B is a European optical imaging satellite that was launched on 7 March 2017. It is the second Sentinel-2 satellite launched as part of the European Space Agency's Copernicus Programme, and with its orbit phased 180° against its sister satellite, Sentinel-2A. The satellite carries a wide swath high-resolution multispectral imager with 13 spectral bands. It provides information for agriculture and forestry, among other services, allowing for prediction of crop yields.

== Mission history ==
A €105 million contract for the construction of the spacecraft was signed in March 2010 by ESA's Director of Earth Observation Programmes and the CEO of Astrium Satellites. It was completed in June 2016, and the satellite was transported to the European Space Research and Technology Centre (ESTEC) for the test campaign.

The spacecraft arrived at the Centre Spatial Guyanais on 6 January 2017 for pre-launch operations. Launch took place at the nominal time of 01:49:24 UTC on 7 March 2017 on board Vega flight VV09. The spacecraft was injected into its target orbit at 02:47:21 UTC.

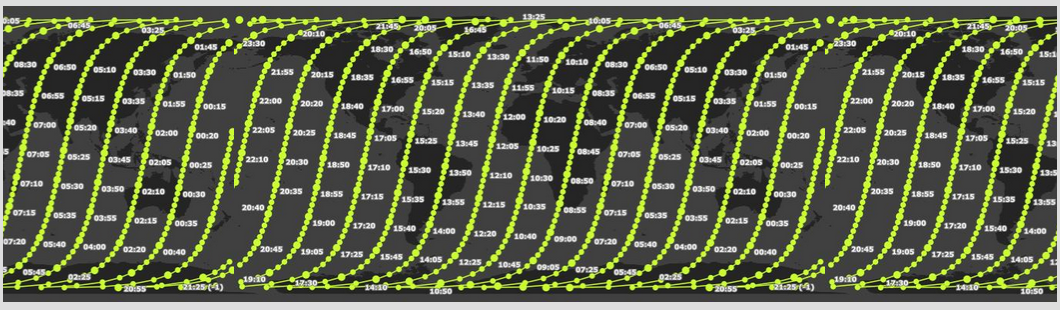
Sentinel 2B's descending orbital path
