= Wildfires in 2021 =

Wildfires on multiple continents

2021 wildfire season
- Date: January–December 2021

The 2021 wildfire season involved wildfires on multiple continents. Even at halfway through the calendar year, wildfire seasons were larger than in previous history, with increased extreme weather caused by climate change (such as droughts and heat waves) strengthening the intensity and scale of fires.

Below is a partial list of articles on wildfires from around the world in the year 2021.

== Africa ==
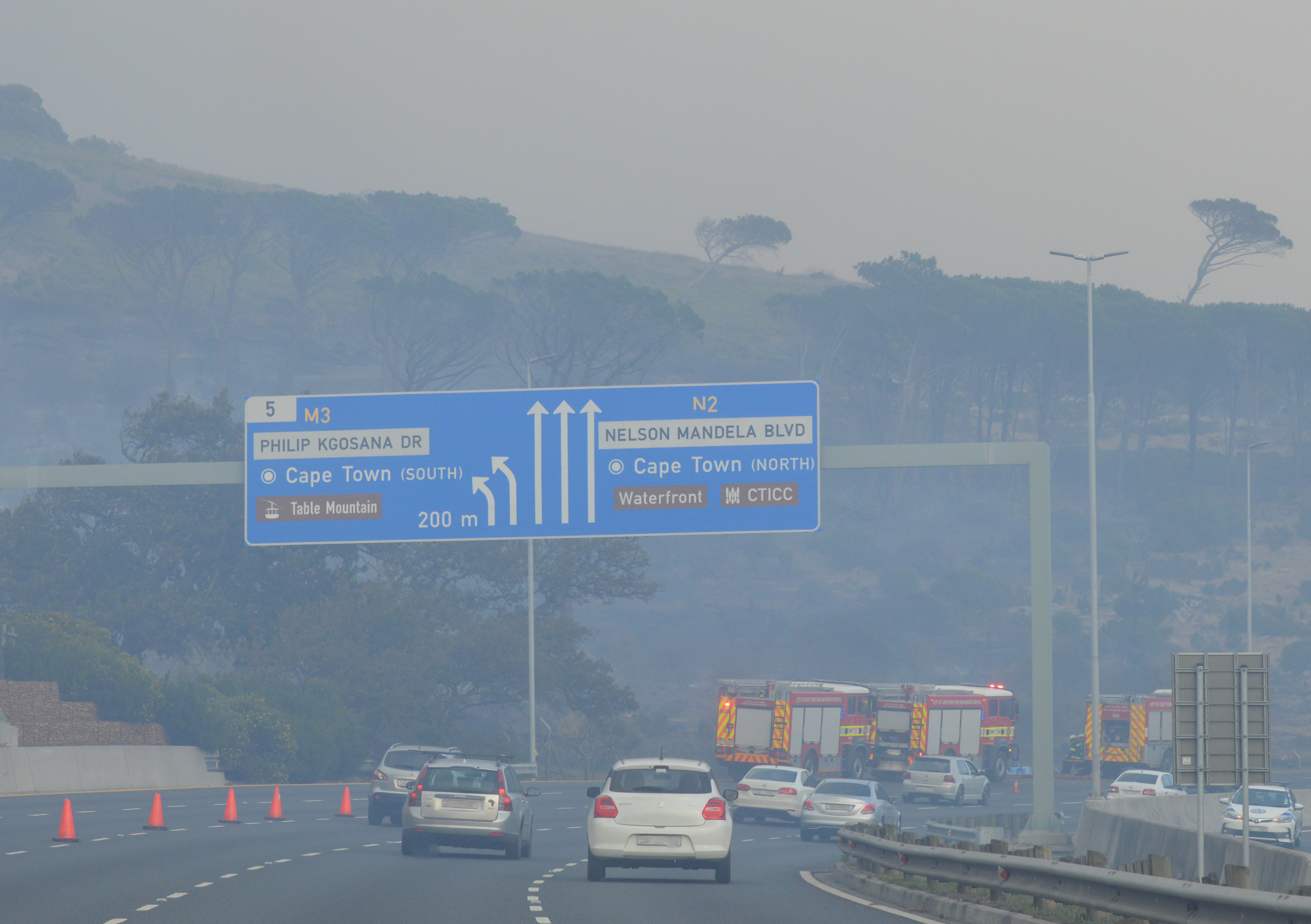
Smoke over City Bowl in Cape Town as fire trucks respond

- 2021 Algeria wildfires
- 2021 Table Mountain fire, South Africa

== Asia ==
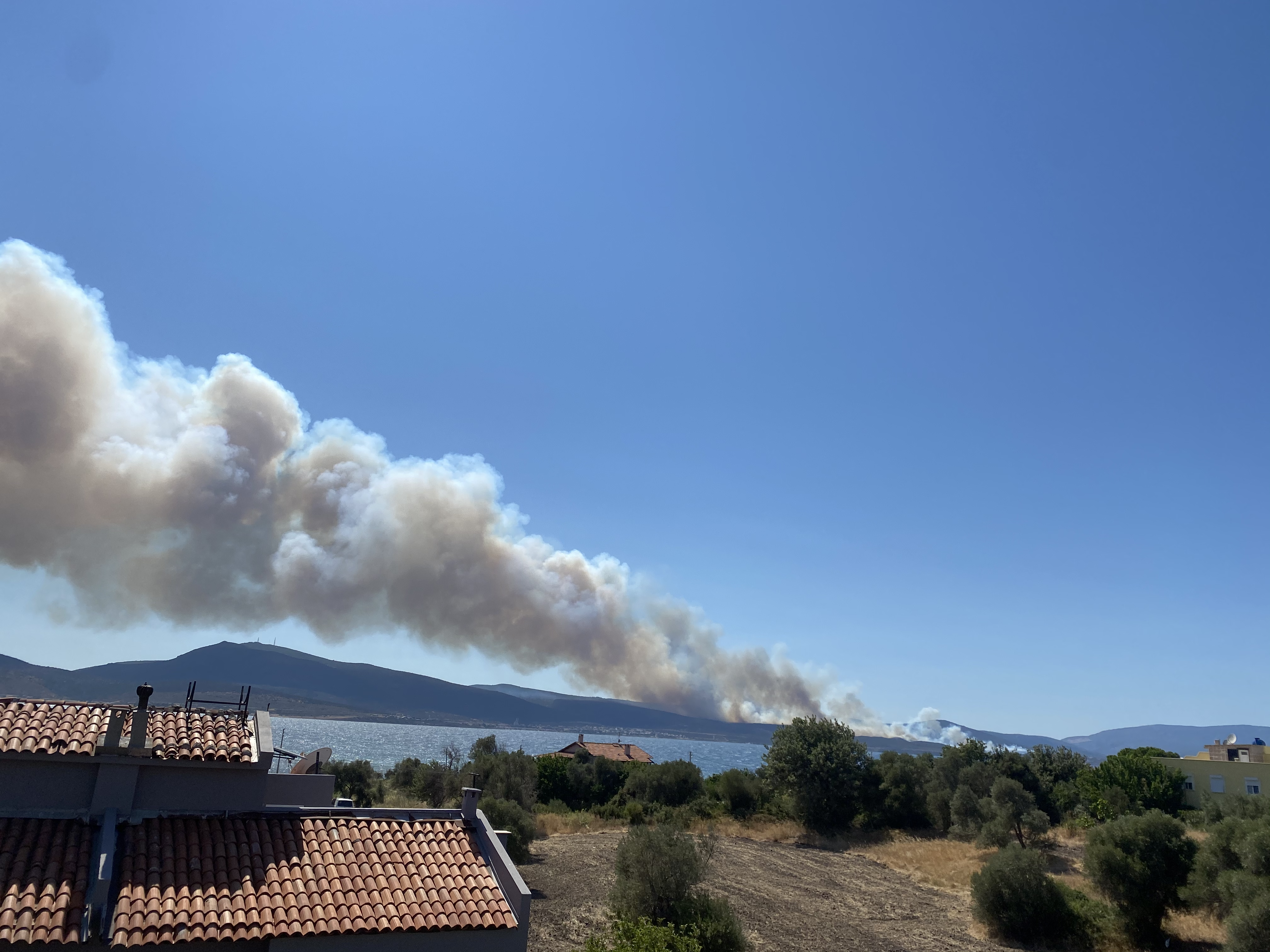
Wildfires in Urla, İzmir in August

- 2021 Limassol wildfires, Cyprus
- 2020–21 Dzüko Valley wildfires, India
- 2021 Simlipal forest fires, India
- 2021 Israel wildfires
- 2021 Russian wildfires
- 2021 Turkish wildfires

== Europe ==
- 2021 France wildfires
- 2021 Greece wildfires
- 2021 Italy wildfires

== North America ==
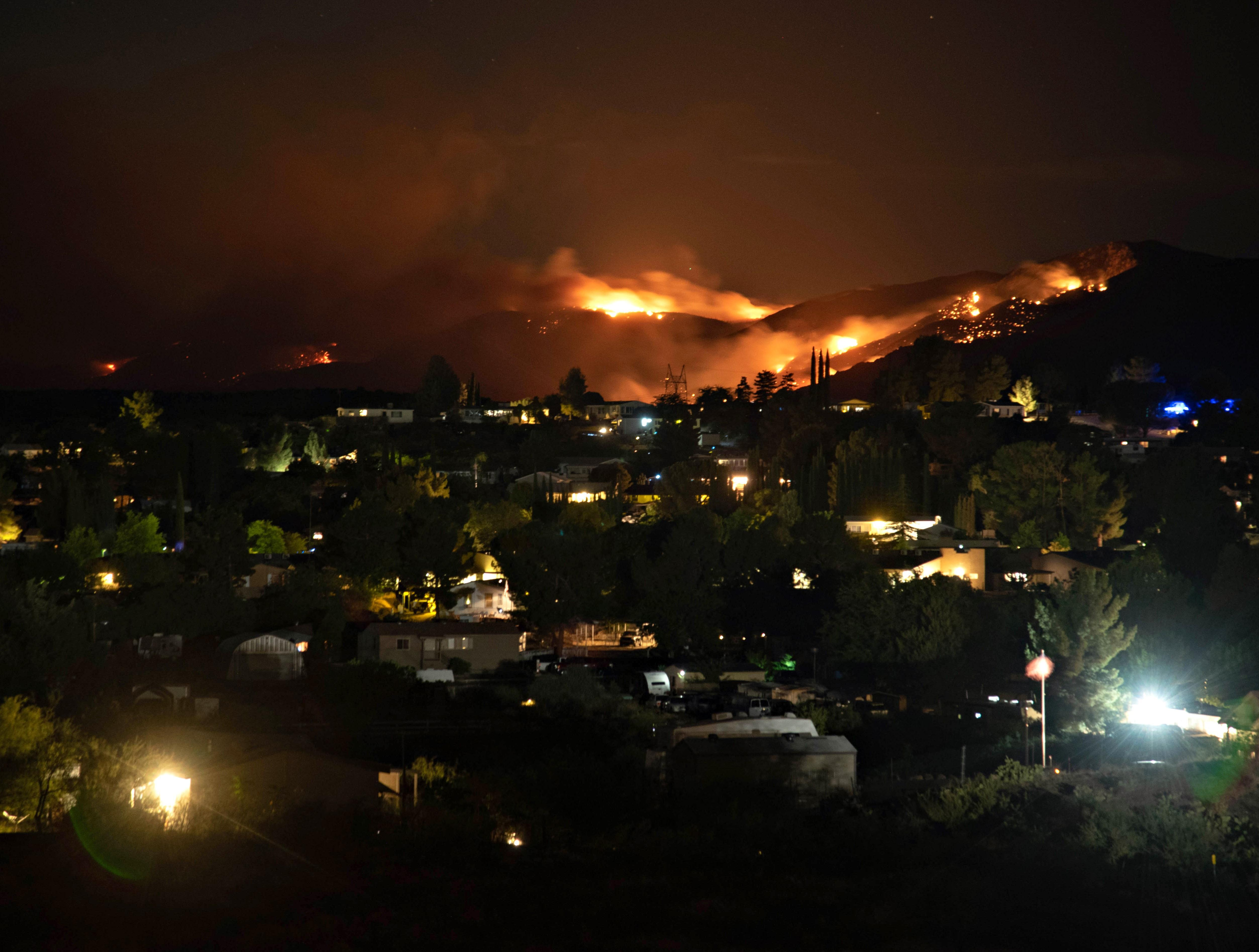
Flames and plumes of smoke from the Tiger Fire can be seen from Spring Valley, Arizona overnight on July 6, 2021.

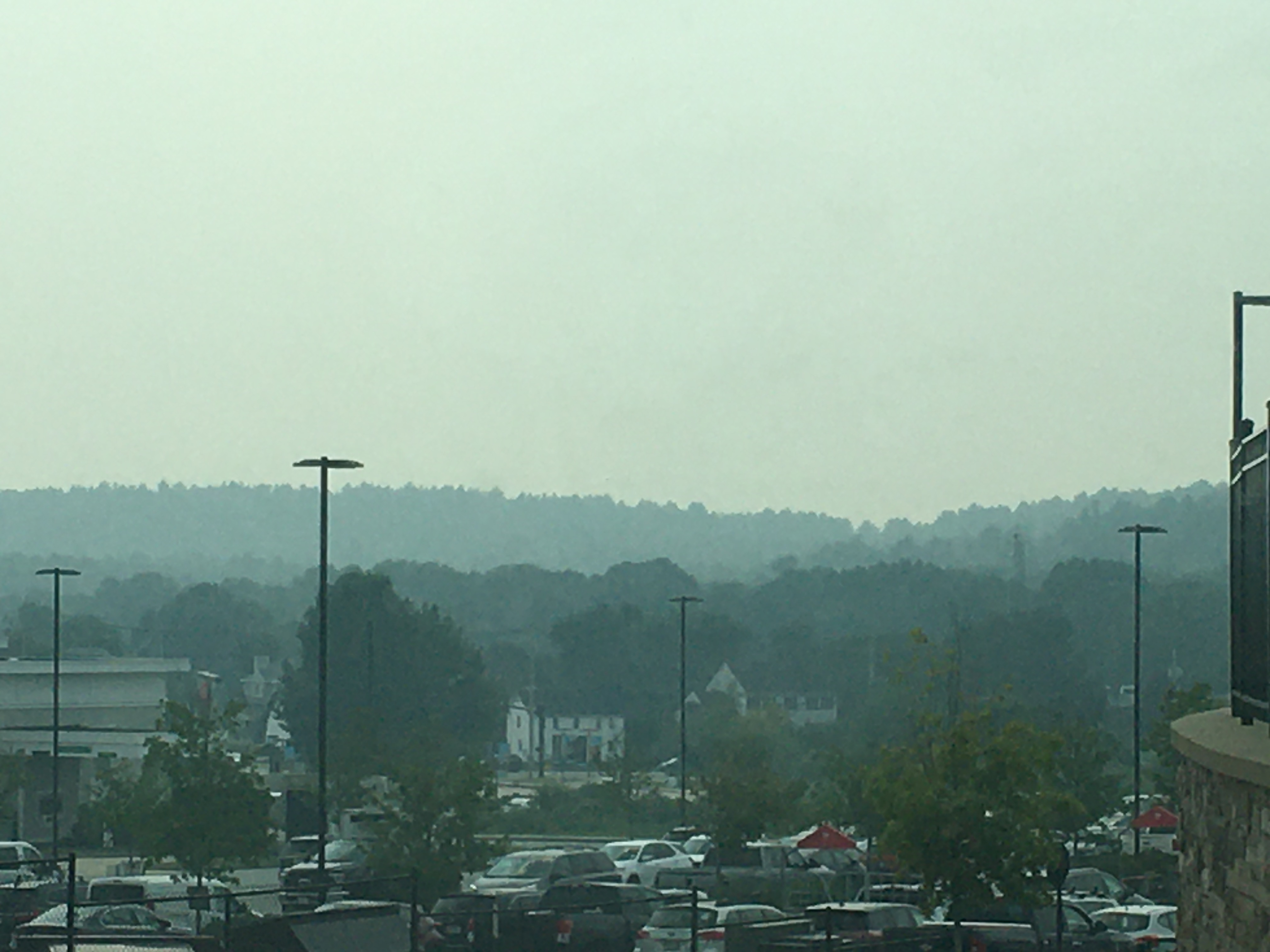
Haze from the West Coast fires in Littleton, Massachusetts on July 26, 2021

- 2021 British Columbia wildfires, Canada
- 2021 Nuevo León wildfires, Mexico
- 2021 Arizona wildfires
- 2021 California wildfires
- 2021 Colorado wildfires
  - 2021–2022 Boulder County fires
- 2021 Kansas wildfires
- 2021 New Mexico wildfires
- 2021 Oregon wildfires
- 2021 Texas wildfires
- 2021 Washington wildfires
- Greenwood Fire, Minnesota, United States
- Snake River Complex Fire, Idaho, United States

== Oceania ==
- 2020–21 Australian bushfire season

== South America ==
- 2021 Argentine Patagonia wildfires
- 2021 Chilean Patagonia wildfire

== See also ==
- Weather of 2021
- 2021 Eurasia winter heatwave
