= FLEX (satellite) =

European Earth observation satellite for monitoring chlorophyll fluorescence

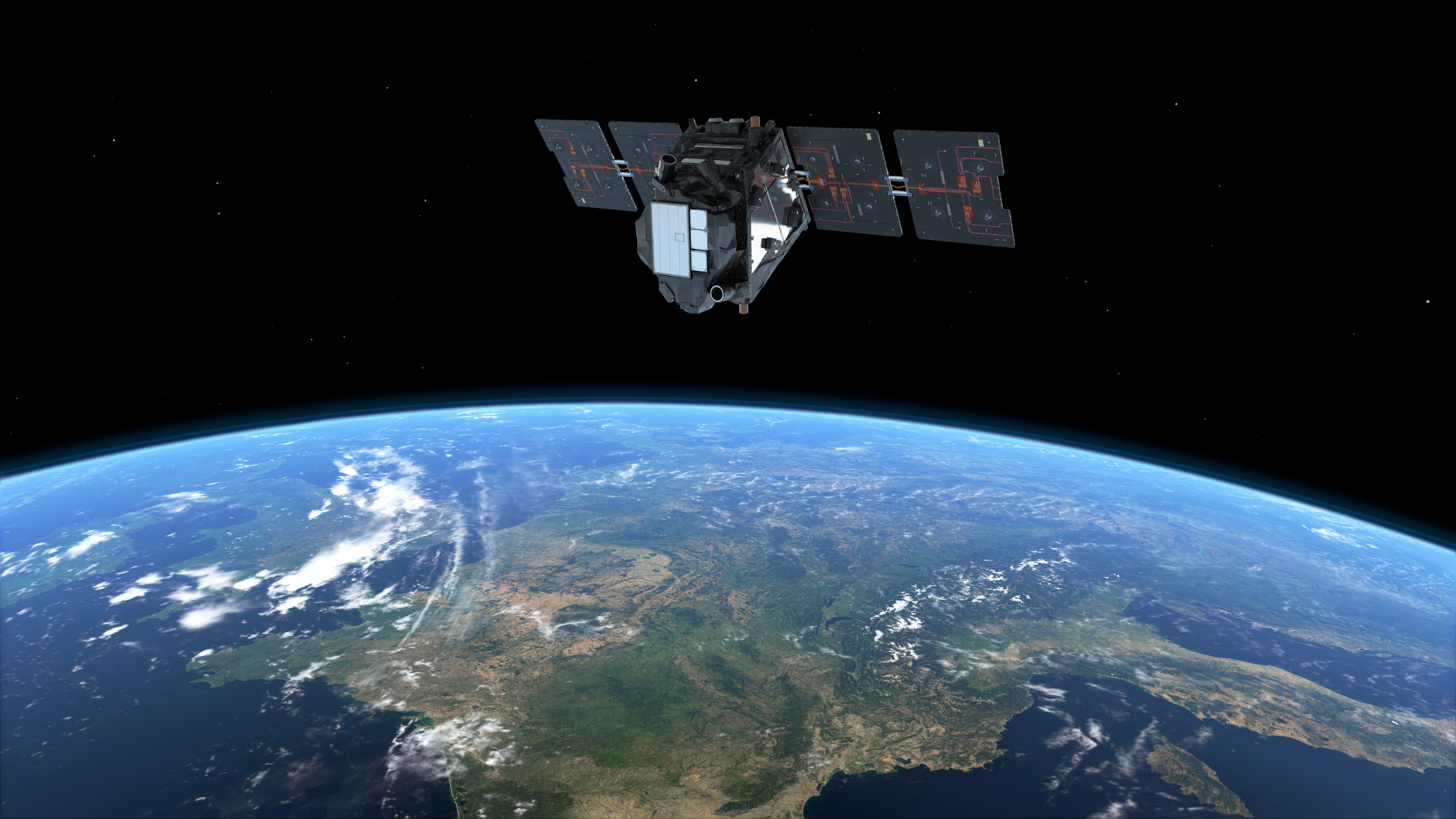
- Mission type: Earth observing satellite
- Operator: ESA
- COSPAR ID: 2026-209A
- SATCAT no.: 100689
- Website: https://earth.esa.int/eogateway/missions/flex
- Mission duration: 3.5 years (planned)

Spacecraft properties
- Bus: Myriade
- Manufacturer: Thales Alenia Space
- Launch mass: 425 kilograms (937 lb)
- Power: 700W

Start of mission
- Launch date: 15 September 2026, 1:21 UTC
- Rocket: Vega-C
- Launch site: Kourou ELV
- Contractor: Arianespace

Orbital parameters
- Reference system: Geocentric
- Regime: Sun-synchronous
- Altitude: 814 km
- Inclination: 98.64°
- Repeat interval: 27 days
- ESA insingia FutureEO

The FLuorescence EXplorer (FLEX) is a satellite developed by the European Space Agency (ESA) for monitoring the global steady-state chlorophyll fluorescence in terrestrial vegetation. FLEX is the eighth mission in the Earth Explorer series of Earth observation satellites, part of ESA's FutureEO programme. The mission was selected for funding in November 2015 and was launched on a Vega C rocket from Guiana Space Centre on 15 September 2026 together with another European Earth observation satellite, Sentinel-3C.

== Science ==
The mission's goal is global monitoring of steady-state chlorophyll fluorescence in terrestrial vegetation. Leaf photosynthesis releases energy not required in the biochemical process in the form of light in wavelength between 640 and 800 nm. Fluorescence is a sensitive indicator of photosynthesis in both healthy and physiologically perturbed vegetation that can be used to monitor croplands and forests.

Fluorescence provides information on overall photosynthetic performance with implications for related carbon sequestration. The responsiveness of fluorescence to atmospheric, soil and plant water balance, as well as to atmospheric chemistry and human intervention in land usage, makes it a useful biological indicator in improving the understanding of Earth system dynamics.

== Timeline ==
=== Development ===
On 19 November 2015, ESA selected FLEX as the agency's eighth Earth Explorer mission. In November 2016, ESA selected Italian company Leonardo to build the main instrument (FLORIS) for the FLEX satellite. In January 2019, ESA selected Thales Alenia Space as the prime contractor for the satellite and to oversee the development of the FLORIS instrument by Leonardo. In January 2022, ESA signed a contract with Arianespace for a launch of FLEX on Vega C. In December 2023, Thales Alenia Space selected the UK's National Satellite Test Facility for the satellite's first comprehensive assembly, integration and test campaign.

In 2018, during the first FLEXSense campaign, the OLCI instruments of the Sentinel-3B satellite was reprogrammed to operate in a mode simulating the future cooperations with FLEX and a parallel aerial campaign used aircraft-based observations to demonstrate aspects of the FLORIS instrument functionality. In summer 2019, the second FLEXSense campaign took place, with operations closely following the 2018 campaign.

=== Construction ===
In 2024, the Fraunhofer IOF in Jena was exhibiting the double-slit assembly, which it had developed for the FLORIS instrument, at SPIE Photonics West in San Francisco. In August 2025, the FLORIS instrument has been joined to the FLEX satellite platform at Thales Alenia Space in Cannes. By mid-April 2026, FLEX has completed its functional and environmental tests and was ready for transport to Guiana Space Centre for launch. The satellite, together with other two European Earth observation satellites, Sentinel-3C and MTG-I2, was presented at a media event hosted by Thales Alenia Space in Cannes.

=== Launch campaign ===
FLEX and Sentinel-3C satellite launched together aboard a Vega-C rocket

In early July 2026, FLEX and Sentinel-3C departed Cannes aboard MN Colibri for French Guiana. The satellites arrived at Pariacabo, the port of Kourou, on 12 July 2026. On 21 July 2026, FLEX was removed from its container packaging at Kourou. In late August 2026, the satellite's tanks were fully filled with 30 kg of fuel. On 2 September 2026, both FLEX and Sentinel-3C were enclosed within the Vega-C fairing; FLEX inside the Vespa secondary payload adapter and Sentinel-3C on top of it. On 7 September 2026, the two satellites inside their launch fairing were transported to the launch tower and later hoisted atop the Vega-C rocket. The launch took place as planned on 15 September at 1:21 UTC. Both satellites successfully separated and started communicating. This was the second space launch operated by Avio independently from Arianespece. The satellite completed its Launch and Early Orbit Phase (LEOP) on 18 September 2026.

== Gallery ==
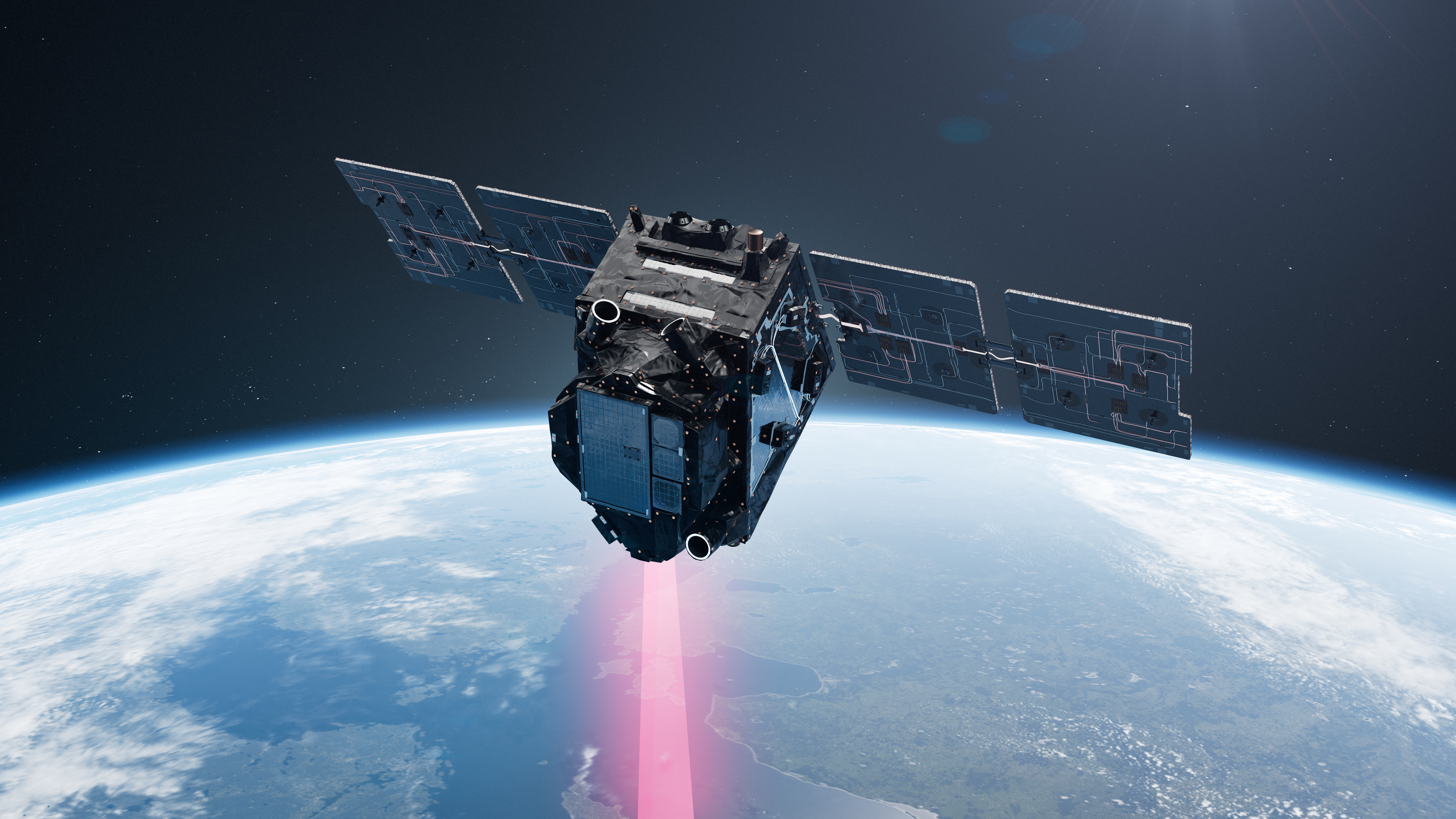
Illustration of the FLEX satellite

Illustration of the FLEX mission's observations

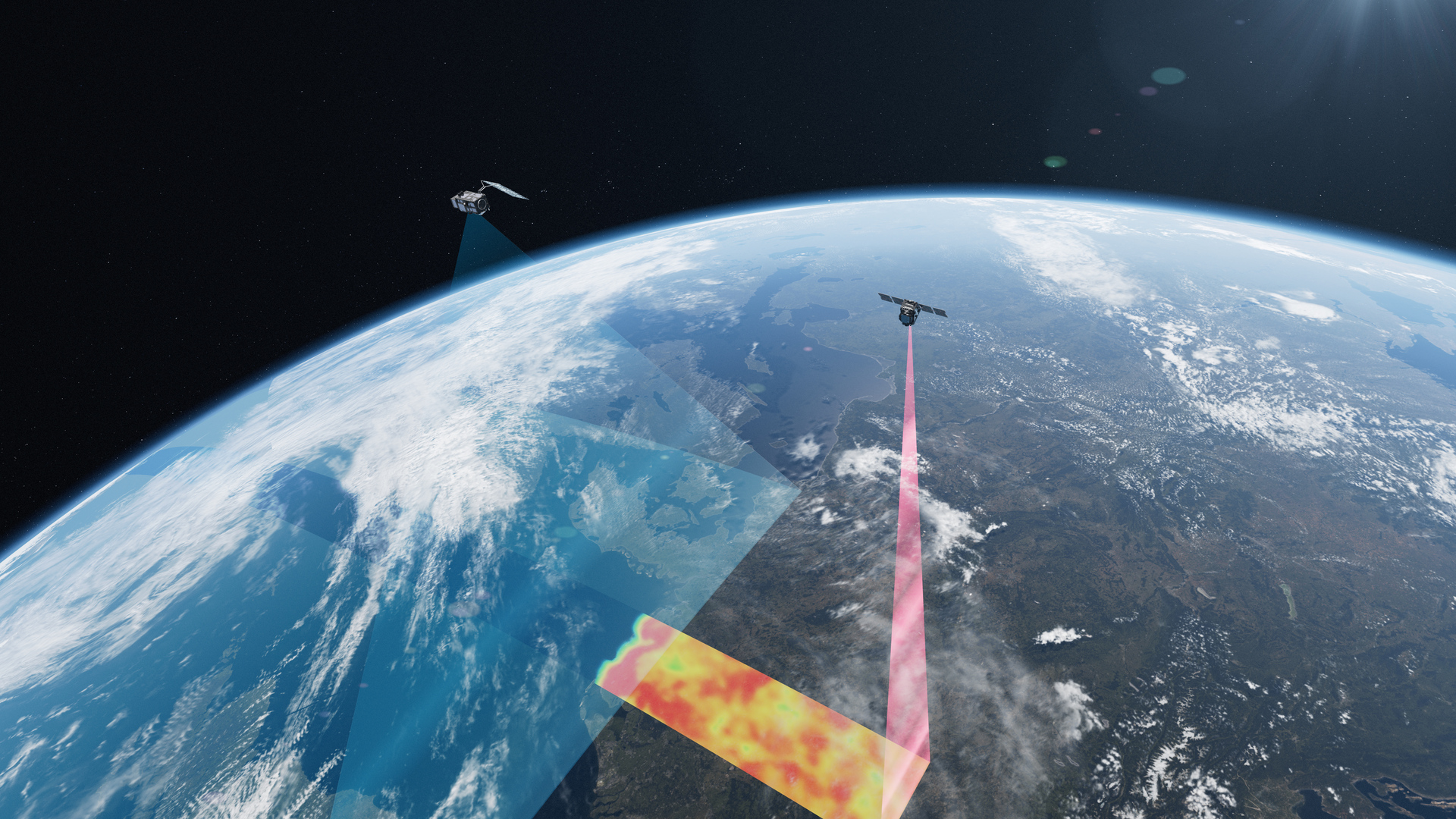
Illustration of FLEX working in tandem with Sentinel-3

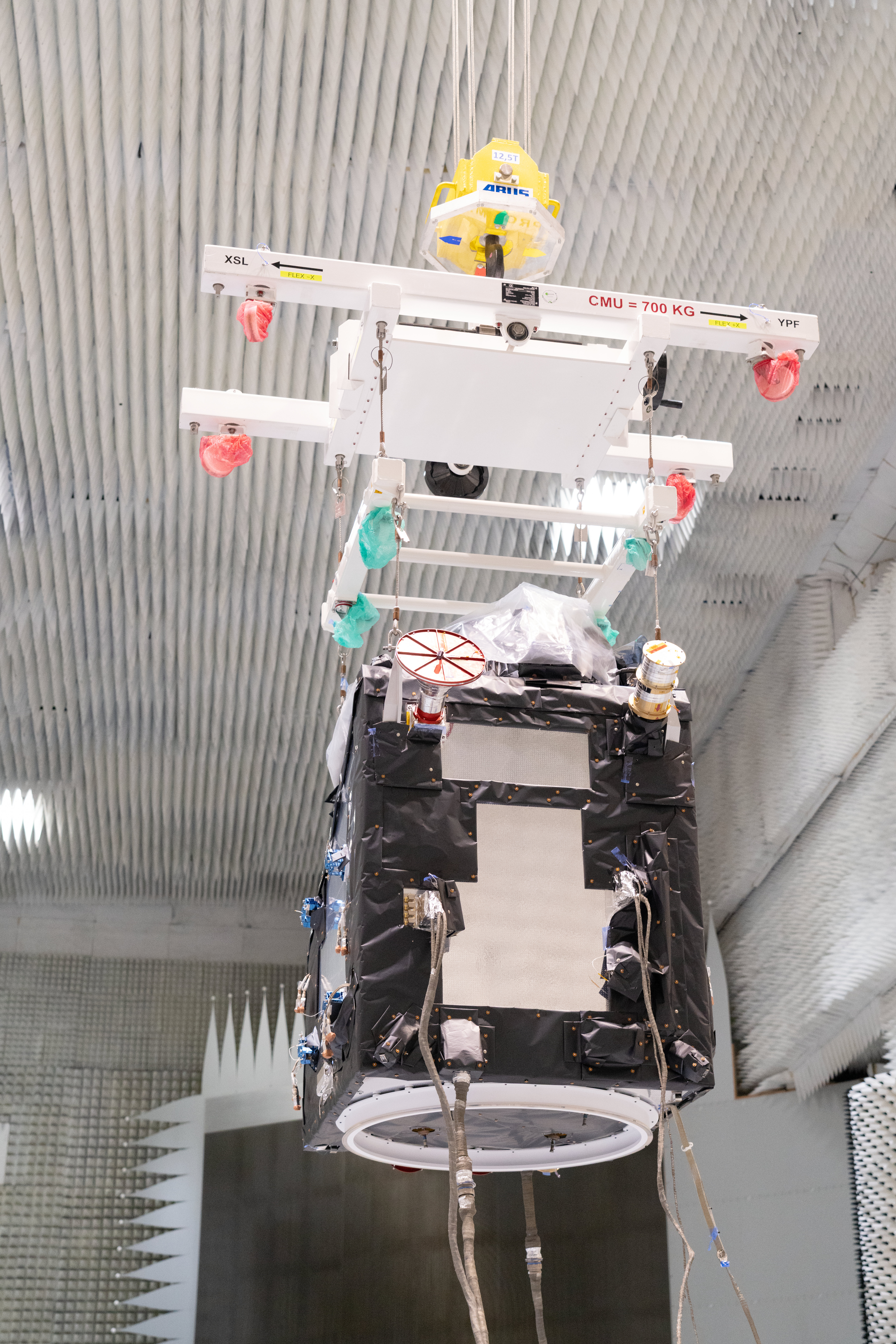
FLEX in Cannes before launch

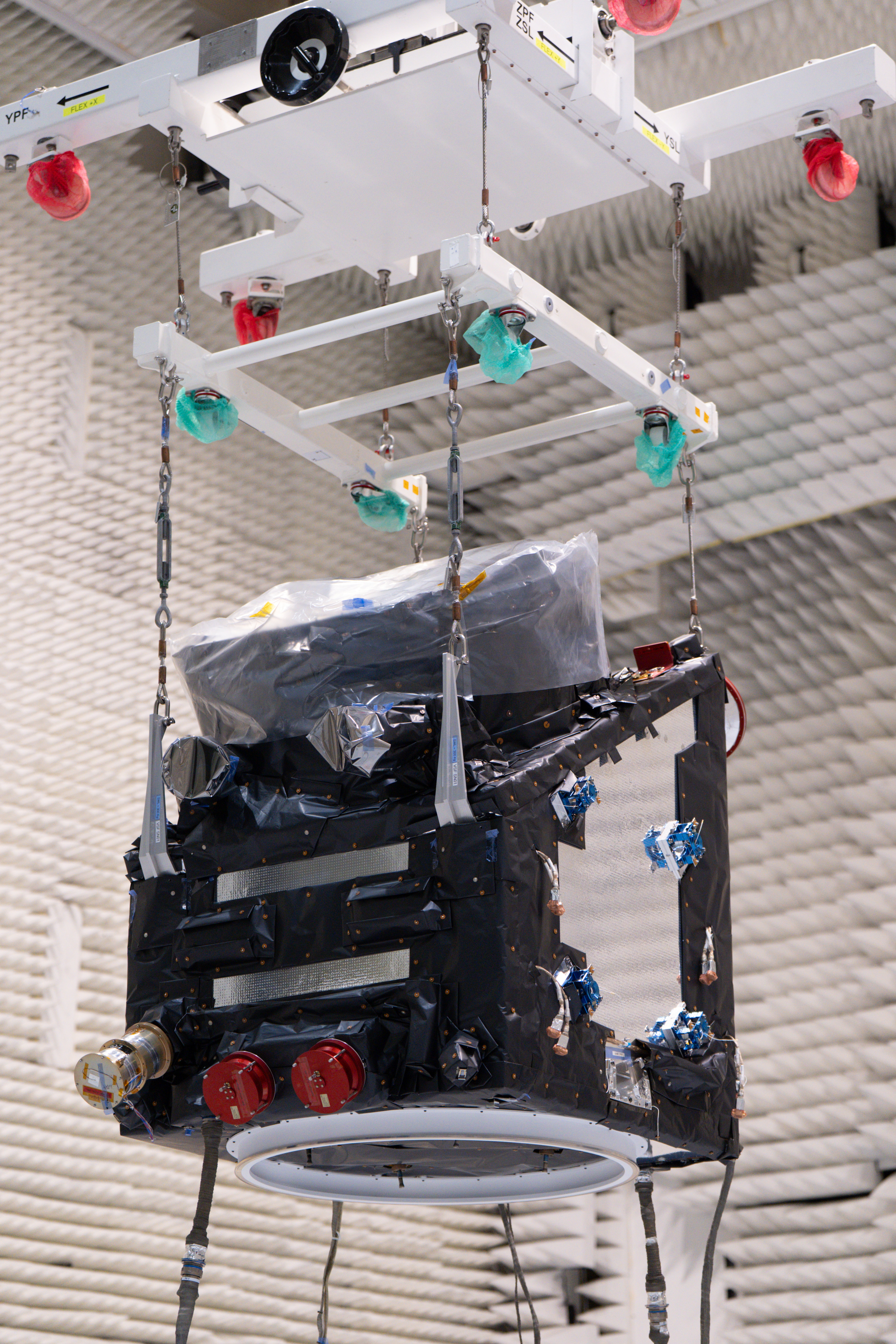
FLEX in Cannes before launch

European Space Agency staff explain how Fluorescence Explorer, or FLEX, will detect the faint signal of plant fluorescence across Earth.

== See also ==
- List of European Space Agency programmes and missions
- List of Earth observation satellites
- Photosynthetic efficiency
- Phototroph
