= Whitmore Fire =

2021 wildfire in Wasigton

- Date: August 3, 2021 – Present
- Location: Nespelem, Washington
- Coordinates: 48.16°N 118.97°W

Statistics
- Burned area: 53,314 acres (21,575 ha)

Ignition
- Cause: Lightning

Map
- Location in Wagigton

The Whitmore Fire is a wildfire that started near Nespelem, Washington

on August 3, 2021. The fire has burned 53,314 acres (21,575 ha) and is 0% contained.

== Events ==
=== June ===
The Whitmore Fire was first reported on August 3, 2021, at 8:30 pm PDT.

=== Cause ===
The cause of the fire is believed to be due to lightning.

=== Containment ===
As of August 8, 2021, the fire is 0% percent contained.

== See also ==
- 2021 Washington wildfires
- List of Washington wildfires
