= Sentinel-3A =

ESA Earth observation satellite

- Vector drawing of the Sentinel-3
- Mission type: Earth observation
- Operator: ESA · EUMETSAT
- COSPAR ID: 2016-011A
- SATCAT no.: 41335
- Website: Sentinel-3 (ESA)
- Mission duration: Planned: 7 years Elapsed: 10 years, 2 months, 27 days

Spacecraft properties
- Spacecraft type: Sentinel-3
- Bus: Prima
- Manufacturer: Thales Alenia Space
- Launch mass: 1,250 kg (2,760 lb)
- Dry mass: 1,150 kg (2,540 lb)
- Dimensions: 3.9 × 2.2 × 2.2 m (12.8 × 7.2 × 7.2 ft)
- Power: 2,300 watts

Start of mission
- Launch date: 16 February 2016, 17:57 UTC
- Rocket: Rokot/Briz-KM
- Launch site: Plesetsk Cosmodrome, Site 133
- Contractor: Eurockot Launch Services

Orbital parameters
- Reference system: Geocentric
- Regime: Sun-synchronous
- Semi-major axis: 7,182.47 km (4,462.98 mi)
- Eccentricity: 0.000309
- Perigee altitude: 802.12 km (498.41 mi)
- Apogee altitude: 806.56 km (501.17 mi)
- Inclination: 98.62°
- Period: 100.97 min
- RAAN: 117.18°
- Argument of perigee: 86.80°
- Mean motion: 14.26 rev/day
- Repeat interval: 27 days
- Epoch: 17 February 2016, 18:53:04 UTC

Transponders
- Band: S band (TT&C support); X band (science data)
- Bandwidth: S band: 64 kbit/s uplink, 1 Mbit/s downlink X band: 2 × 280 Mbit/s
Instruments
- OLCI: Ocean and Land Colour Instrument
- SLSTR: Sea and Land Surface Temperature Radiometer
- SRAL: Synthetic Aperture Radar Altimeter
- MWR: Microwave Radiometer
- DORIS: Doppler Orbitography and Radiopositioning Integrated by Satellite
- LRR: Laser Retro-Reflector
- GNSS: Global Navigation Satellite System

Sentinel-3A is a European Earth observation satellite dedicated to oceanography which launched on 16 February 2016. It was built as a part of the Copernicus Programme, and is the first of four planned Sentinel-3 satellites. Its sister satellite, Sentinel-3B, launched on 25 April 2018. After completing initial commissioning, each satellite was handed over to EUMETSAT for the routine operations phase of the mission. Two recurrent satellites—Sentinel-3C and Sentinel-3D—will follow in approximately 2026 and 2028 respectively to ensure continuity of the Sentinel-3 mission.

== Mission history ==
In October 2015, the Sentinel-3A launch was planned for December 2015, but delays in transportation from Cannes to the Plesetsk Cosmodrome postponed the launch to January 2016. The spacecraft arrived at Talagi Airport aboard an Antonov An-124 on 28 November. By 17 December, Sentinel-3A completed pre-launch testing and was placed into storage for the Christmas break, lasting until 11 January 2016. After the break, launch was scheduled for 4 February, but while the spacecraft was being fuelled for launch, Khrunichev Space Center in Moscow determined that the launch pad needed to be recertified, resulting in a further delay. Launch was eventually rescheduled for 16 February.

=== Launch ===
Sentinel-3A was successfully launched on 16 February 2016 at 17:57 UTC from the Plesetsk Cosmodrome aboard a Rokot launch vehicle. The Briz-KM upper stage fired twice to insert the spacecraft into its intended 815 km (506 mi) orbit, first at 5 minutes and then at 75 minutes after launch. Spacecraft separation occurred at 79 minutes after launch, and ground controllers received the first communication from the vehicle at 92 minutes.

=== Operations ===
The first instrument switched on was OLCI. It made its first picture on 29 February 2016, capturing Svalbard island along with a part of the arctic ice pack near solar terminator.

== See also ==
- Sentinel-3#Instruments
