= 2021 Kansas wildfire outbreak =

Natural disaster in the USA

December 15 Kansas wildfire outbreak
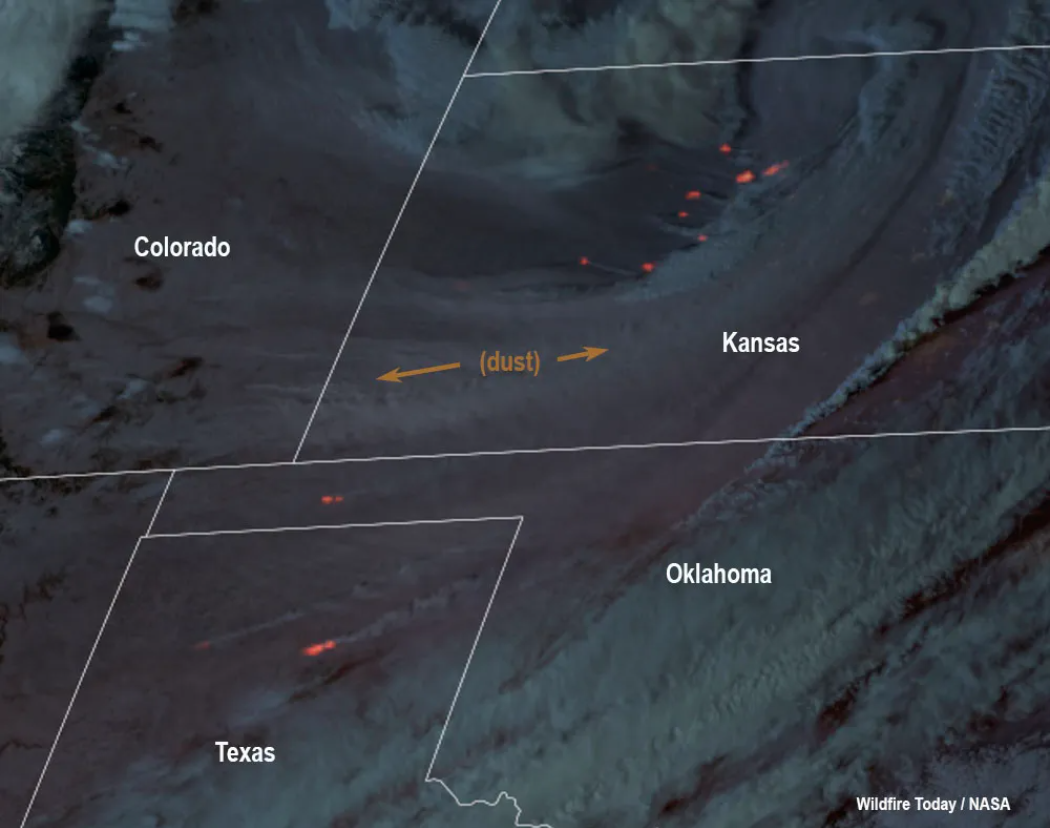
- Satellite image of the outbreak of wildfires burning in the U.S. states of Kansas, Oklahoma, and Texas on December 15, 2021
- Date: December 15 –; December 23, 2021
- Location: Western and Central portions of Kansas

Statistics
- Total fires: 16
- Total area: 163,755 acres (66,269 ha) (Note: It was first estimated by the Kansas Forest Service that more than 400,000 acres (160,000 ha) burned on December 15, but with the help of the National Interagency Fire Center, the acreage burned was revised down to 163,000 acres (66,000 ha).)

Impacts
- Deaths: 2
- Injuries: 3 hospitalized
- Structures destroyed: 42+
- Cost: $2.3 million (2021 USD)

Ignition
- Cause: Low-pressure system causing high winds; Downed power lines; Drought

Map
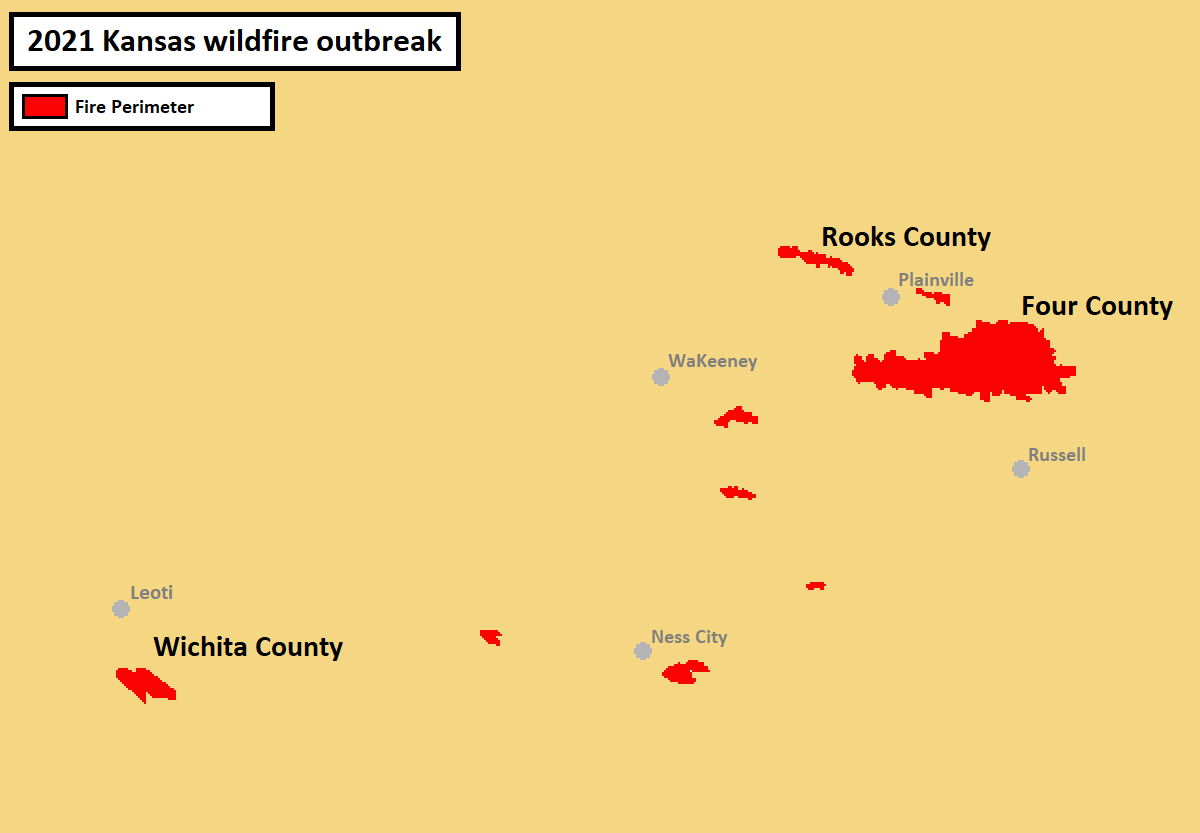
- The perimeters of the wildfires that started on December 15, 2021

On December 15, 2021, the Midwestern U.S. state of Kansas was met with strong and damaging winds caused by the December 2021 Midwest derecho and tornado outbreak, which produced dust storms and multiple wildfires. An estimated 163,000 acres (66,000 ha) burned on the first day wildfires spawned due to dry fuel and strong wind gusts reaching up to 100 mph (160 km/h). The western and central portions of Kansas were mostly affected by the fires. Before December 15, forecasters had predicted that dry air, gusty winds, and warm temperatures could be present throughout the following days, creating conditions favorable for wildfires to spread quickly through the area. The largest wildfire, the Four County Fire, burned numerous buildings and killed hundreds of cattle along the way with a scorched area of 121,622 acres (49,219 ha).

Due to gusty winds that were in attendance in the area, the toppling of power lines started to take place, sparking a few wildfires. Drought conditions also played a role in the wildfire outbreak, in which the western and central portions of Kansas were "Abnormally Dry" and in "Severe Drought". The drought and wildfires significantly impacted Kansas agricultural operations by not being able to produce livestock.

== Background ==
The Kansas wildfire season usually begins and progresses through the spring. But unusual drought conditions started to emerge in Western Kansas; the drought eventually advanced into parts of Central Kansas in the autumn as a result of no recorded rainfall since November 3, 2021. Due to drought in the region, farmers were unable to grow crops such as wheat.

Before December 15, the Wichita, Kansas National Weather Service had warned citizens in Kansas to be cautious about an upcoming windstorm that could produce winds up to 100 mph (160 km/h), and the storm could eventually spawn wildfires and fling debris. The weather forecast showed relative humidity on Wednesday, December 15, being at 10 to 15 percent. The forecast also showed winds being at their strongest peak in the afternoon on December 15. The National Weather Service had recommended residents of Western and Central Kansas to stay inside their homes due to a high risk of blowing dust.

== Wildfire outbreak ==
After the windstorm had passed over Kansas, more than 10 wildfires were present in the western and central portions of the state, which burned more than 163,000 acres (66,000 ha) on the first day they were first reported. At the time, wind gusts reached up to 100 mph (160 km/h) as expected. Two major grass fires were being monitored until both of them had merged into one large wildfire, being named the Four County Fire. By 3:06 a.m. (CST) on Thursday, December 16, the Four County Fire had reached a burned area of approximately 96,000 acres (39,000 ha) and satellites had detected heat from the wildfire seven miles away near Russell, Kansas. Due to the wildfires and strong winds, 24 out of the 105 counties in Kansas issued local disaster declarations. Most of the wildfires ravaged the counties of Ellis, Osborne, Rooks, and Russell. In Russell County, wildfires prompted evacuations of 500 to 600 residents for the areas of Waldo, Paradise, and Fairport. Wildfires burned and destroyed multiple homes and businesses in their path, mainly in the city of Paradise. Many families in Paradise lost their homes, ranches, and cattle due to the wind-driven wildfires.

To assist firefighters in battling the raging wildfires, on December 16, the Kansas National Guard mobilized UH-60 Black Hawk helicopters to help firefighters get a hold of the fires burning in Western and Central Kansas. No other firefighting aircraft was able to take to the air in the area where wildfires were nearby because of winds reaching up to 80 mph (130 km/h). Earlier on the evening of December 15, while firefighters were trying to get the fast-moving fires under control, smoke from the Four County Fire had traveled for miles, and smoke was eventually seen from Lincoln, Nebraska. Later that day, on December 16, aircraft were ultimately able to fly over wildfire-ravaged areas because of wind speeds having to decrease. On December 17, several wildfires were still burning, but not as intensely as they were on December 15. Winds for the city of Russell on December 17 decreased to 8 to 14 miles per hour (13 to 23 km/h). Throughout the following days, relative humidity had dropped into the mid-20s, which made efforts for firefighters to put out the blazes difficult.

Two days later, on December 17, the North Wichita Fire was fully contained, with a burned area of 7,572 acres (3,064 ha). The wildfire destroyed five structures and cost approximately $46,000 (2021 USD). Another but smaller wildfire, the Wichita County Fire, was contained a day later on December 18 with a burned area of 782 acres (316 ha). The wildfire also destroyed five structures and cost approximately $25,000. On December 23, the largest wildfire, the Four County Fire, was fully contained and had scorched an area of 121,622 acres (49,219 ha) and destroyed 32 structures. The cost of the wildfire is still unknown.

=== Fatalities ===
A total of two fatalities were confirmed of an 84-year-old rancher who lived near the city of Leoti, Kansas, and of a 36-year-old man whose remains were found near his vehicle, which was also burned. Both men were killed due to sustained burn injuries caused by the wildfires. The 84-year-old man named Richard Shimanek was badly injured in the wildfires while trying to save his home. He was later taken to a hospital in Denver, Colorado, where he later died due to his injuries. The second fatality, a 36-year-old man named Derrick Kelley, who was first reported missing by his fiancée on Wednesday, December 15, during the wildfire outbreak. Derrick Kelley was reportedly last seen in Hays, Kansas, on December 15, soon before his fiancée reported him missing. On the morning of December 17, his body was found next to his burnt vehicle.

== Cause ==
Dry grassland due to abnormally dry and severe drought conditions in Western and Central Kansas helped the December 15 wildfires to spread quickly into nearby cities and towns, destroying numerous structures. High winds also contributed to the development of the wildfires. In some cases, the wind toppled power lines, sparking new major fires. At the time, warm temperatures and low humidity were also present, making conditions even more favorable for the fires burning near the cities of Paradise and Waldo.

== Aftermath ==
The wildfire outbreak resulted in a burned area of more than 163,000 acres (66,000 ha) in portions of Western and Central Kansas, leaving the deaths of two individuals and injured three more civilians. Mainly in the cities of Paradise and Waldo, more than 42 structures were destroyed. The windstorm and wildfires caused more than $2.3 million (2021 USD) worth of damage. The wildfire outbreak also had an impact on Kansas agricultural operations and also had an impact on the company, Midwest Energy. Approximately 700 power poles belonging to Midwest Energy were toppled during the wind and wildfire event. Because of the drought and wildfires, the production of livestock and crops grew slim due to an impact on Kansas agricultural operations. Disaster assistance was provided by the U.S. Department of Agriculture (USDA) to Kansas ranchers and farmers who were mostly affected by the disaster. Producers who lost livestock such as cattle were entitled to the Livestock Indemnity Program (LIP).

== Gallery ==
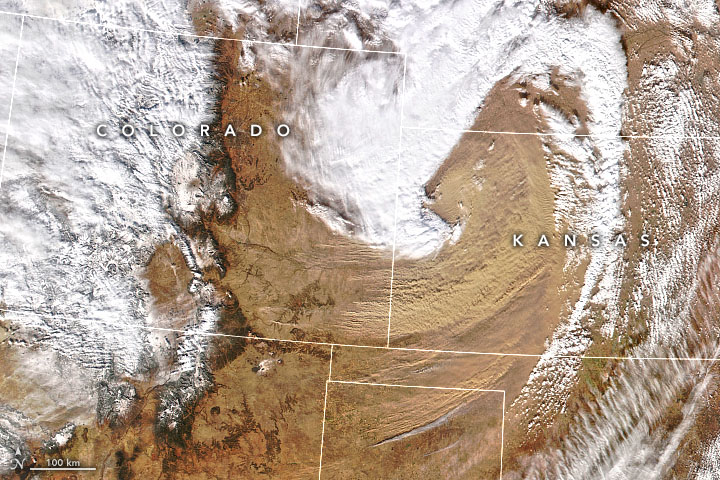
Due to gusty winds caused by a low-pressure system, winds had swept dust into southeastern Colorado and western Kansas.

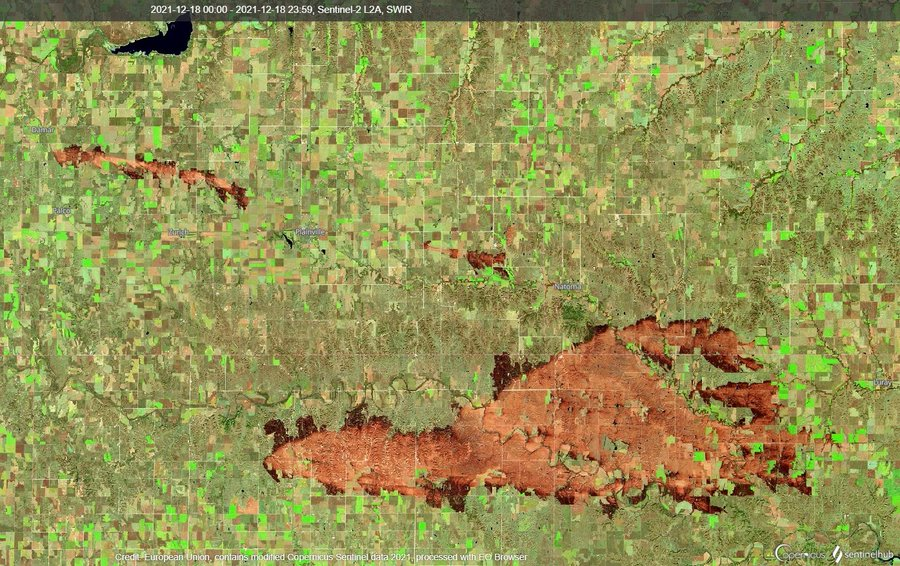
Burn scars of the Rooks County (left) and Four County (right) fires after the wildfire siege.

== See also ==
- Wildfires in 2021
- Wildfires in the United States
- List of natural disasters in the United States
- 2021-2022 Boulder County fires – Another wildfire outbreak that occurred 15 days later on December 30, 2021, in Boulder County, Colorado.
