= Sentinel-3C =

ESA Earth observation satellite

- Vector drawing of the Sentinel-3
- Mission type: Earth observation
- Operator: ESA · EUMETSAT
- COSPAR ID: 2026-209B
- SATCAT no.: 100690
- Website: Sentinel-3 (ESA)
- Mission duration: Planned: 7 years

Spacecraft properties
- Spacecraft type: Sentinel-3
- Bus: Prima
- Manufacturer: Thales Alenia Space
- Launch mass: 1,250 kg (2,756 lb)
- Dry mass: 1,150 kg (2,535 lb)
- Dimensions: 3.9 × 2.2 × 2.2 m (12.8 × 7.2 × 7.2 ft)
- Power: 2,300 watts

Start of mission
- Launch date: 15 September 2026
- Rocket: Vega-C
- Launch site: Kourou, ELV
- Contractor: Avio

Orbital parameters
- Reference system: Geocentric
- Regime: Sun-synchronous

Transponders
- Band: S band (TT&C support); X band (science data)
- Bandwidth: S band: 64 kbit/s uplink, 1 Mbit/s downlink X band: 2 × 280 Mbit/s
Instruments
- OLCI: Ocean and Land Colour Instrument
- SLSTR: Sea and Land Surface Temperature Radiometer
- SRAL: Synthetic Aperture Radar Altimeter
- MWR: Microwave Radiometer
- DORIS: Doppler Orbitography and Radiopositioning Integrated by Satellite
- LRR: Laser Retro-Reflector
- GNSS: Global Navigation Satellite System

Sentinel-3C is a European Earth observation satellite dedicated to oceanography, launched on 15 September 2026. It is part of the European Union's Copernicus Programme, and the third of four planned Sentinel-3 satellites (after Sentinel-3B, launched in 2018). The satellite's prime contractor is Thales Alenia Space. The satellite delivered its first images in late September 2026, two weeks after its launch.

== Gallery ==
The Copernicus Sentinel-3C and FLEX satellite are launched together aboard a Vega-C rocket from Europe’s Spaceport in French Guiana 15 September 2026.

== See also ==
- List of European Space Agency programmes and missions
- List of Sentinel satellites
