= Snake River Complex Fire =

2021 wildfire in Idaho, Washington and Oregon

- Date: July 7, 2021 – August 20, 2021
- Location: Lewiston, Idaho
- Coordinates: 46.012°N 116.911°W

Statistics
- Burned area: 109,444 acres (44,290 ha)

Impacts
- Structures lost: 0

Ignition
- Cause: Lightning

Map
- Location in Western Idaho

The Snake River Complex Fire was a large complex of wildfires that occurred through Idaho, Washington and Oregon. The fire started 42 miles south of Lewiston, Idaho, on July 7, 2021. It burned 109,444 acres (44,290 ha) before being contained August 20.

== Events ==
=== July ===
The Snake River Complex Fire was first reported on July 7, 2021, at around 6:45 a.m. PDT 23 miles south near Waha, Idaho.

=== Cause ===
The cause of the fire is believed to be due to lightning.

=== Containment ===
As of July 17, 2021, the fire was 31% percent contained, and as of August 2, it was 87% contained. It was contained on August 20.

== See also ==
- 2021 Oregon Wildifres
- 2021 Washington Wildfires
- List of Washington Wildfires
  - Dry Gulch Fire, another large wildfire burning near the Snake River Complex Fire
