= Rock Island Creek =

Rock Island Creek is a creek in Douglas County, Washington. It rises in Douglas County (47°34′45″N 120°11′00″W), flows past Badger Mountain, and its mouth (47°21′16″N 120°06′24″W) is near Rock Island Dam on the Columbia River.
