= 2021 Eurasia winter heat wave =

High temperatures in February, 2021, across Europe

Meteorological history
- Duration: 20-28 February 2021
- Heat wave
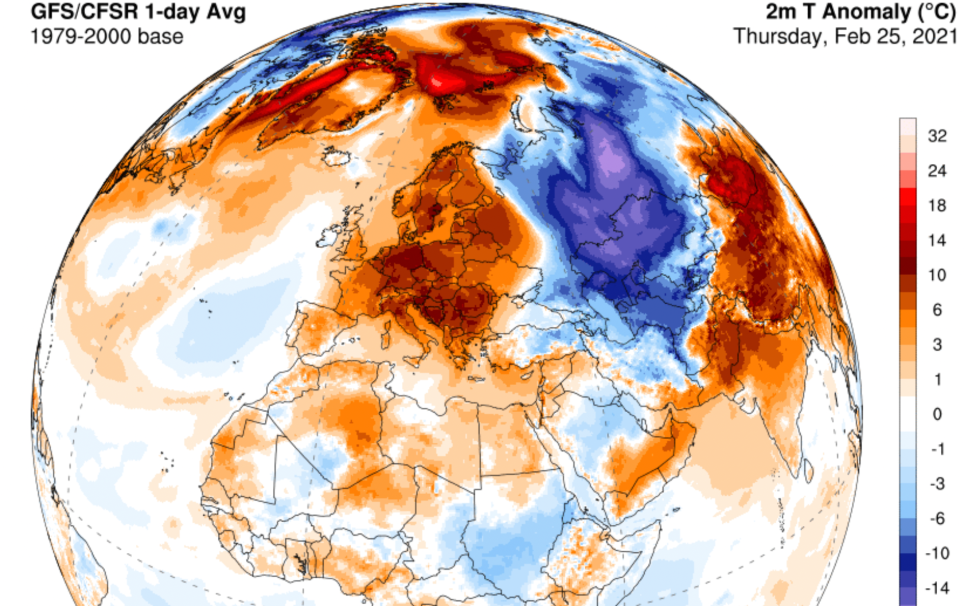
- Temperature anomalies recorded in the Arctic, Greenland, Europe, and Asia on February 25, 2021

Overall effects
- Fatalities: None
- Areas affected: Europe, Asia

Across Europe and parts of Asia, unusually high-temperatures in the late-winter period were reported from February 20 until February 28, 2021. The onset of the short-lasting winter heat wave was caused by a jet stream of Saharan dust. Daily high temperatures for the period were similar to the maximum high temperatures during spring.

In the capitals of Germany and France, Berlin and Paris, high temperatures of 20 °C (68 °F) were reported. The capitals of the UK and Poland, London and Warsaw, had high temperatures around 18 °C (64 °F). Croatia saw its highest overall temperature of 26.4 °C (79.5 °F). The capital of China, Beijing, also experienced the highest overall winter temperature: 25.6 °C (78.1 °F).

== Areas affected ==
=== United Kingdom ===
The previous winter heatwave, that affected the United Kingdom in 2019, set a record-breaking day in Aboyne, Scotland, after 122 years at 18.3 °C (64.9 °F) with three other sites exceeding over 20 °C (68 °F). Warnings were set off across UK for not only the heatwave but a pollen bomb just shortly after the January 2021 coldwave went through UK and Europe.

=== Europe ===
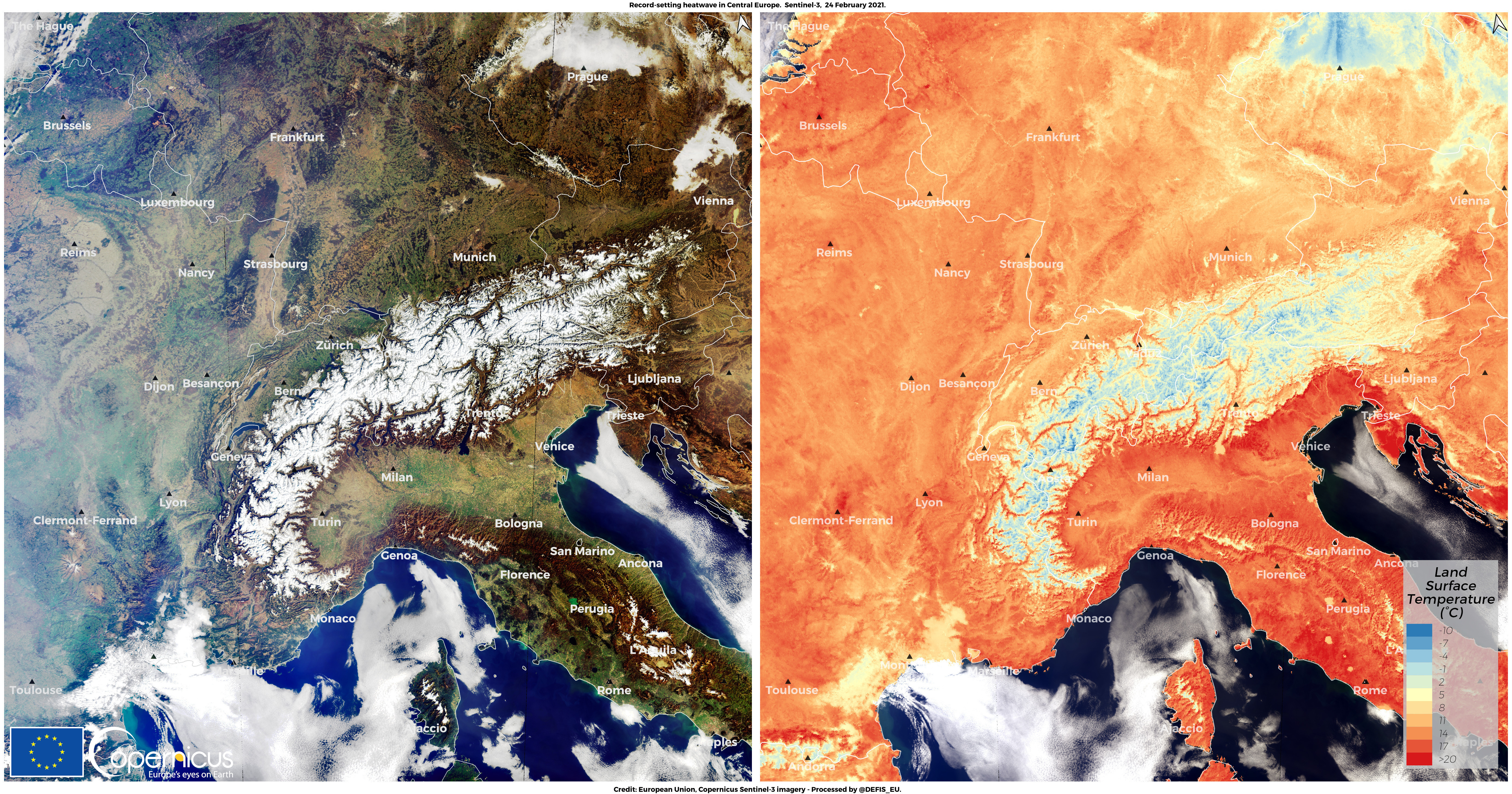
A Sentinel-3 satellite image shows true colour (left) and land temperature (right) on February 24, 2021

Among the European cities such as Berlin, and Paris reaching 20 °C (68 °F), the warmer climate of Europe also has seen increase of overall high winter temperature and those were reported in Slovenia at 25.2 °C (77.4 °F), Italy at 25.2 °C (77.4 °F) and Czech Republic at 20 °C (68 °F). In Poland, record temperature of 21.7 °C (71.1 °F) was reported in Makow Podhalanski and in Slovakia at Hurbanavo, a high temperature of 20.8 °C (69.4 °F) was reported. Sweden had set a record high temperature of 16.8 °C (62.2 °F) caused by the foehn wind.

=== Asia ===
In China, Beijing experienced a record high day of 25.6 °C (78.1 °F) breaking the 1996 record on February 13, while Anyang and Hefei hit 28.8 °C (83.8 °F) and 28.7 °C (83.7 °F), respectively. While Longzhou and Cao Bang both reached 29.5 °C (85.1 °F) on February 20. Pohang, South Korea surpassed its own 24.5 °C (76.1 °F) set in 2004 with a new 24.9 °C (76.8 °F) on February 21. In China, it was the warmest February recorded nationwide since 1961.

== See also ==
- 2021 Russia heatwave
- 2021 Western North America heat wave
