= National Satellite Test Facility =

Coordinates: 51.5768°N 1.3131°W

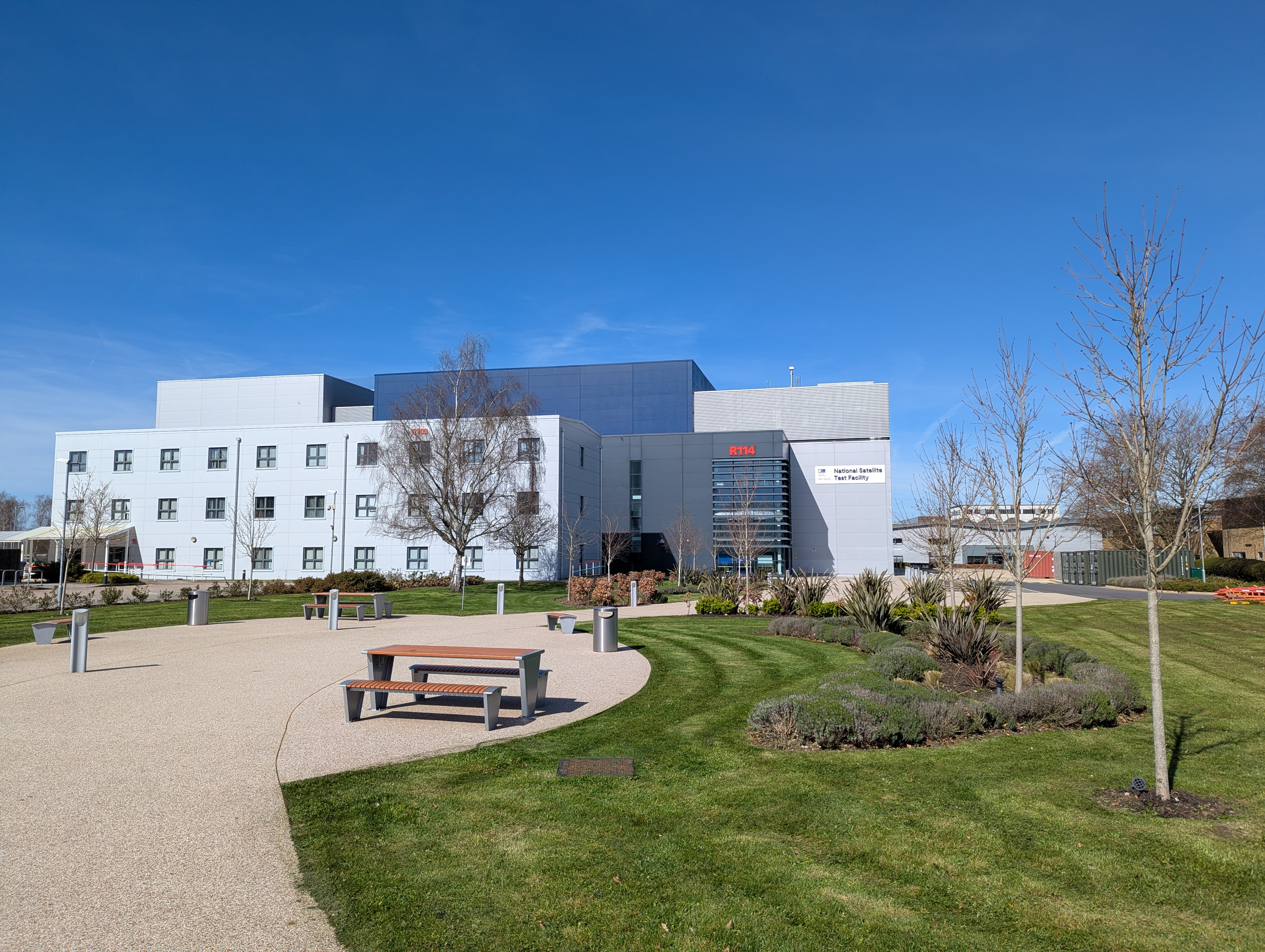
National Satellite Test Facility

The National Satellite Test Facility (NSTF) is a testing site for artificial satellites, located in Harwell, Oxfordshire, in the United Kingdom. It is the first dedicated satellite testing facility in the UK. Construction began in 2018 and was completed in 2024. The facility opened in May 2024. The facility was funded by UK government as a result of a facilities gap study led by UK Space Agency, and is operated by RAL Space, a department of the Science and Technology Facilities Council.

Its first customers were Airbus Defence and Space UK.
