= Sentinel-3 =

Earth observation satellite series

- Manufacturer: Thales Alenia Space
- Country of origin: European Union
- Operator: EUMETSAT
- Applications: Earth observation

Specifications
- Spacecraft type: Satellite
- Bus: Prima
- Series: 2
- Launch mass: 1,250 kg (2,756 lb)
- Dimensions: 3.710 × 2.202 × 2.207 m (12.2 × 7.2 × 7.2 ft)
- Power: 2,100 W
- Regime: Sun-synchronous low Earth polar orbit
- Orbital period: 100.987 min
- Revisit period: 27 days
- Design life: 7 years

Production
- Status: Active
- On order: 2
- Built: 3
- Launched: 2
- Operational: 2
- Maiden launch: Sentinel-3A; 16 February 2016
- Last launch: Sentinel-3C; 15 September 2026

Sentinel-3 is an Earth observation heavy satellite series developed by the European Space Agency as part of the Copernicus Programme. It consists of 3 satellites: Sentinel-3A, Sentinel-3B, and Sentinel-3C. Sentinel-3D will follow in 2029 to ensure continuity of the Sentinel-3 mission. Each Sentinel-3 satellite is designed to operate for seven years in a sun-synchronous low Earth polar orbit. The satellites use multiple sensors to measure topography, temperature, marine ecosystems, water quality, pollution, and other features for ocean forecasting and environmental monitoring.

== Overview ==
The Sentinel-3 satellites travel in a sun-synchronous orbit at an altitude of approximately 814 km (506 mi), with an inclination of 98.6° and orbit cycle of approximately 101 minutes. The local time of descending node is 10:00 a.m. and nominal duration is 7.5 years. A pair of Sentinel-3 satellites enables a short revisit time, allowing the earth to be imaged at least once every two days by the OLCI instrument, and at least once per day by the SLSTR instrument at the equator. This is achieved using both Sentinel-3A and Sentinel-3B satellites in conjunction. The satellite orbit provides a 27-day repeat for the topography package, with a 4-day sub-cycle.

== History ==
On 14 April 2008, the European Space Agency and Thales Alenia Space signed a €305 million contract to build the first GMES Sentinel-3 in its Cannes Mandelieu Space Center. Bruno Berruti led the team that was responsible for delivering the Copernicus Sentinel-3 satellites from the drawing board into orbit. The satellite platform was delivered to France for final integration in 2013. The communications systems were completed by Thales Alenia Space España in early 2014. Sentinel-3A was launched on 16 February 2016 on a Rokot vehicle from the Plesetsk Cosmodrome, Russia. This first launch was followed by the launch of Sentinel-3B on 25 April 2018, also aboard a Rokot. Each satellite is designed to operate for 7 years. On 15 September 2026, the third satellite Sentinel-3C was launched on Vega-C from the Guiana Space Centre.

== Objectives ==
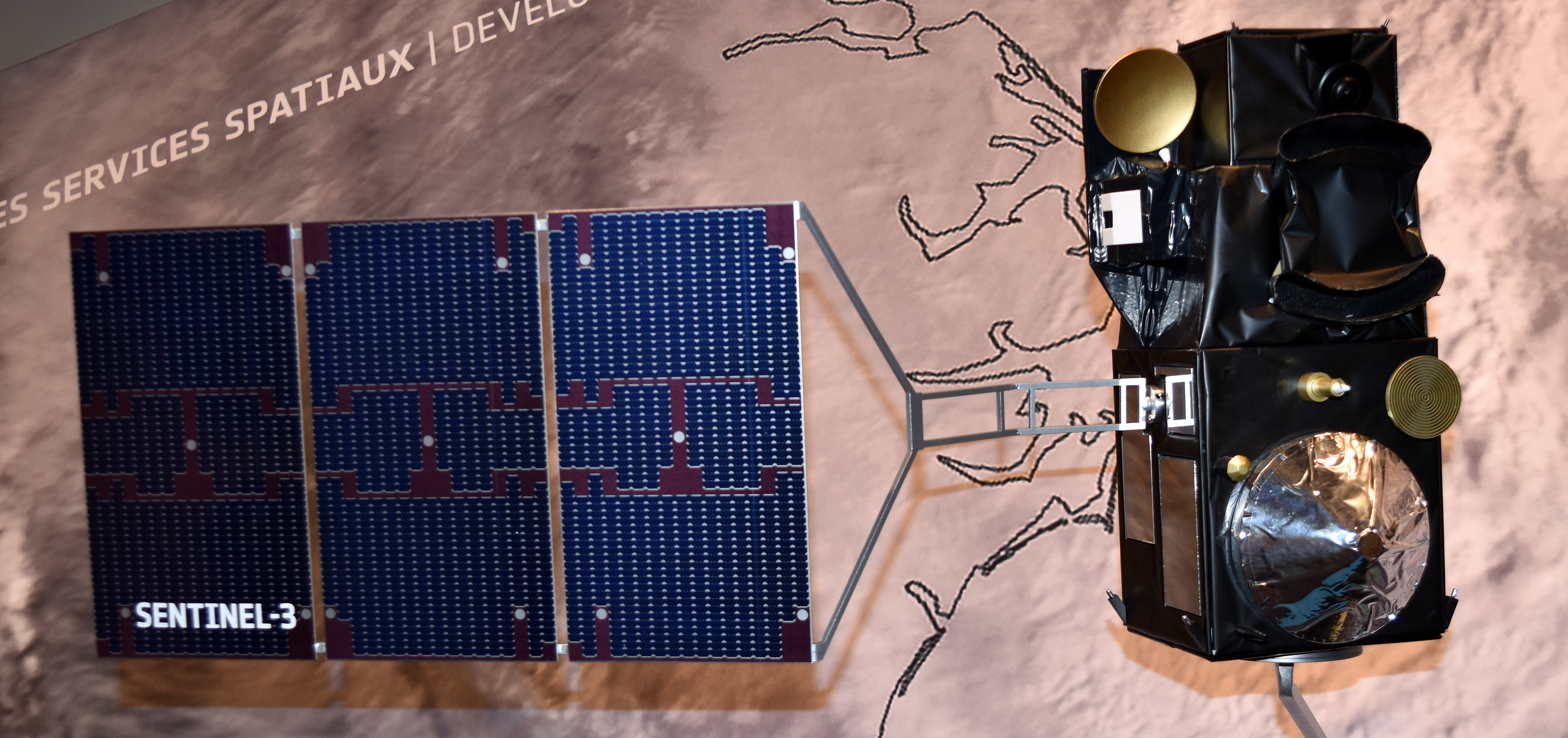
Model of Sentinel-3

The Sentinel-3 mission's main objectives are to measure sea-surface topography, land- and sea-surface temperature, land- and ocean-surface colour with accuracy in support of ocean forecasting systems, and for environmental and climate monitoring. Sentinel-3 builds directly on the heritage pioneered by ERS-2 and Envisat satellites. Near-real time data will be provided for ocean forecasting, sea-ice charting, and maritime safety services on the state of the ocean surface, including surface temperature, marine ecosystems, water quality, and pollution monitoring.

Further objectives of the mission include:

- Measure sea-surface topography, sea-surface height, and significant wave height
- Measure ocean and land-surface temperature
- Measure ocean and land-surface colour
- Monitor sea and land ice topography
- Sea-water quality and pollution monitoring
- Inland water monitoring, including rivers and lakes
- Aiding marine weather forecasting with acquired data
- Climate monitoring and modelling
- Land-use change monitoring
- Forest cover mapping
- Fire detection
- Weather forecasting
- Measuring Earth's thermal radiation for atmospheric applications

== Instruments ==
Sentinel-3 makes use of multiple sensing instruments:

=== SLSTR ===
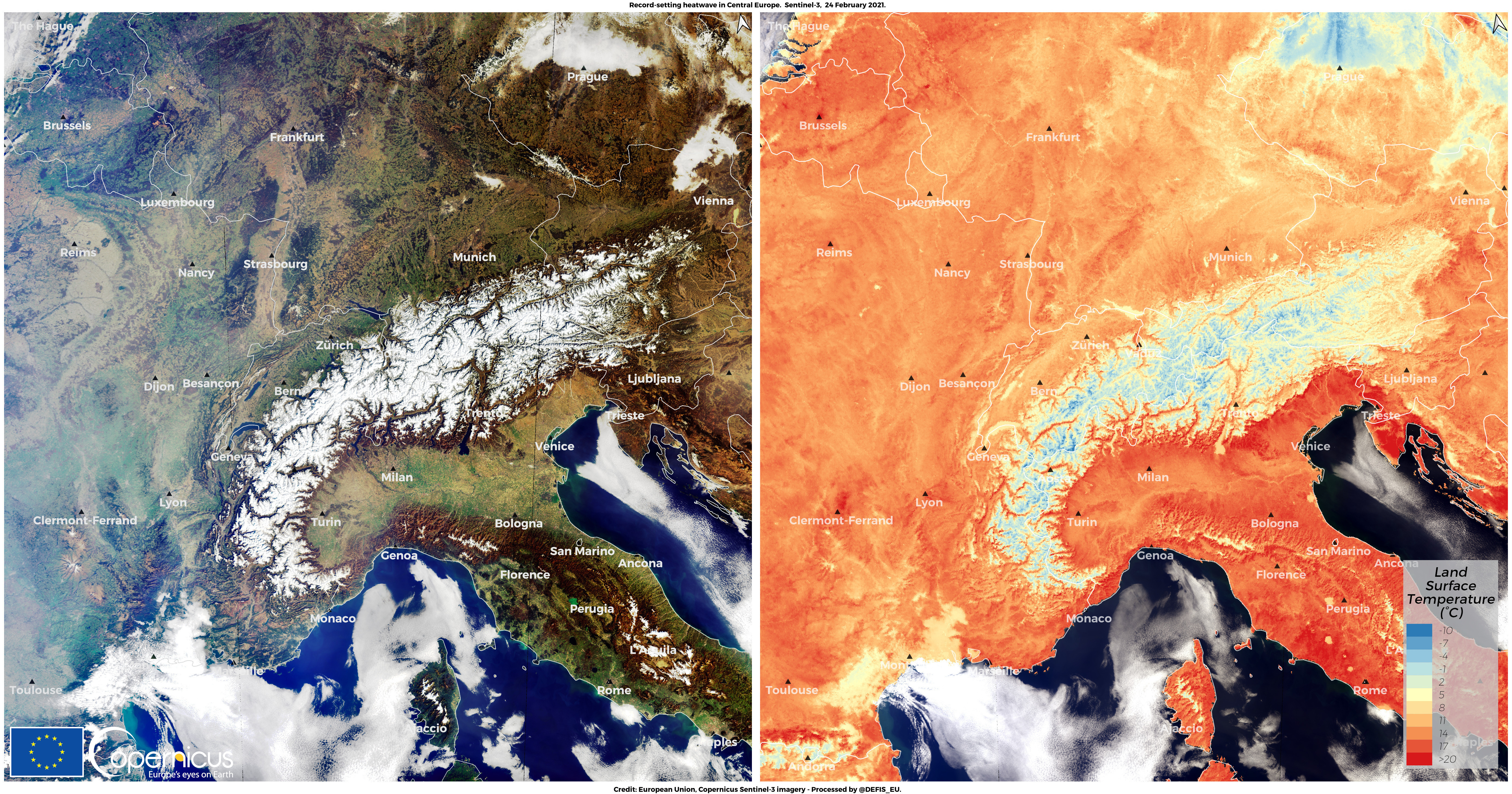
A Sentinel-3 image shows true colour (left) and land temperature (right) during the 2021 Eurasia winter heat wave

SLSTR (Sea and Land Surface Temperature Radiometer) determines global sea-surface temperatures to an accuracy of better than 0.3 K (0.3 °C; 0.5 °F). It measures in nine spectral channels and two additional bands optimised for fire monitoring. The first six spectral bands cover the visible and near-infrared (VNIR) spectrum as well as the short-wave infrared (SWIR) spectrum; VNIR for bands 1 to 3, and SWIR for bands 4 to 6. These 6 bands have a spatial resolution of 500 m (1,600 ft), while bands 7 to 9 as well as the two additional bands have a spatial resolution of 1 km (0.6 mi). For the SLSTR instrument on Sentinel-3, calibration on-board is one of the most important features for the thermal and infrared channels. This instrument has two black body targets used for calibration, one at similar temperature to the optics (about 260 K or −13 °C), and one at a higher temperature (302 K or 29 °C), such that the temperature range corresponds to ocean surface temperatures measured by the instrument.

=== OLCI ===
Ireland viewed by Sentinel-3 during January, 2024

OLCI (Ocean and Land Colour Instrument) is a medium-resolution imaging spectrometer that uses five cameras to provide a wide field of view. The OLCI is an along-track or "push broom" scanner, meaning that the sensor array is arranged perpendicular to the path of flight. This method essentially eliminates the scale distortion near the edge of an image that is common with across-track or "whisk broom" scanners. OLCI has 21 spectral bands with wavelengths ranging from the optical to the near-infrared. Bands vary in width from 400 nm to 1020 nm, and serve a variety of different purposes, including measuring water vapour absorption, aerosol levels, and chlorophyll absorption. SLSTR and OLCI are optical instruments with an overlap of their swath path, allowing for new combined applications.

Due to climate changing factors, inland coastal regions have become an increased area of concern, and from 2002 to 2012 the Medium Resolution Imaging Spectrometer (MERIS) provided quality observations for analysis. The OLCI improves upon the MERIS in that it was built with six additional spectral bands, higher-end signal-to-noise ratio (SNR), reduced solar glar, a maximum of 300 m spatial resolution, and increased ground coverage allowing it to sense cyanobacteria levels within inland coastal ecosystems. OLCI is currently the only sensor in space able to detect cyanobacteria.

=== SRAL ===
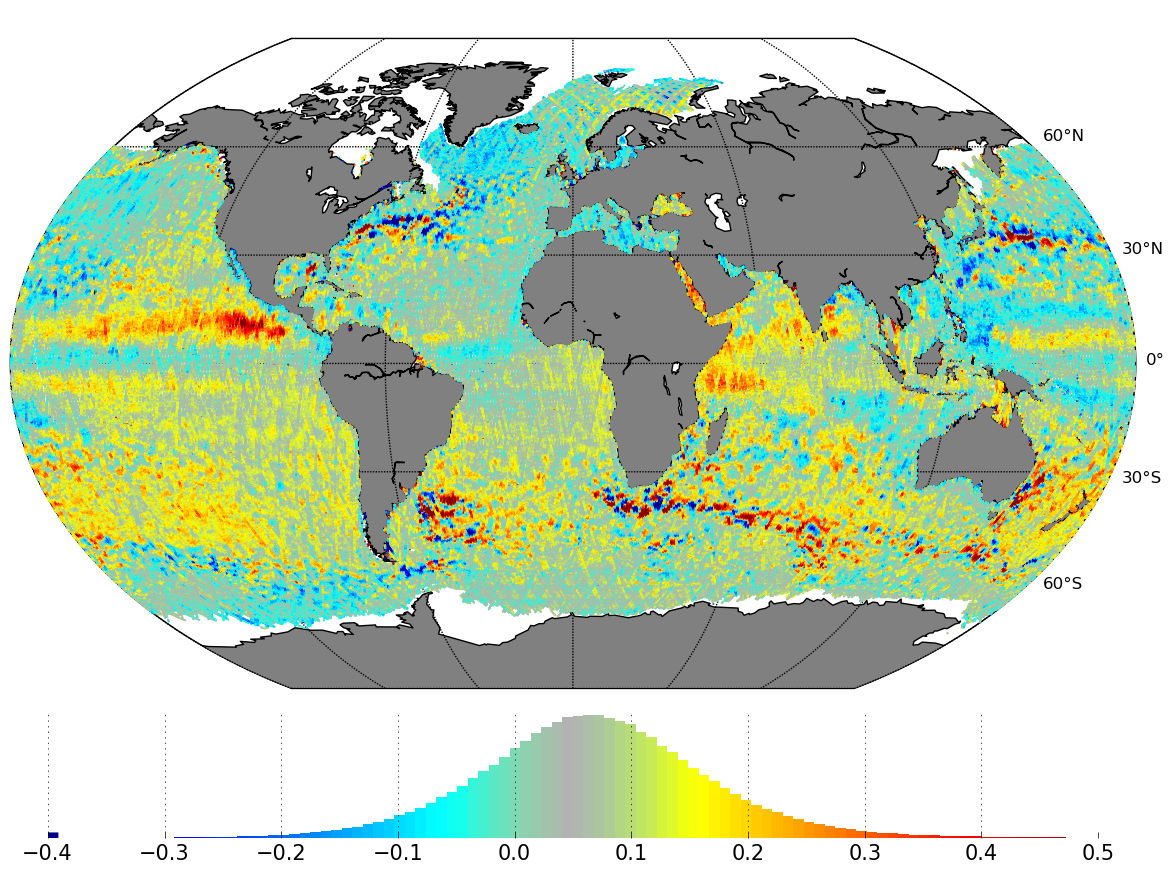
A map of sea-level anomaly measurements from March and April 2016, acquired by the SRAL instrument on the Sentinel-3A satellite

SRAL (Synthetic Aperture Radar Altimeter) is the main topographic instrument to provide accurate topography measurements over sea ice, ice sheets, rivers, and lakes. It uses dual-frequency K_{u} and C band and is supported by a microwave radiometer (MWR) for atmospheric correction and a DORIS receiver for orbit positioning. This allows the instrument, which is based on legacy missions such as CryoSat and the Jason missions, to provide a 300-meter resolution and a total range error of 3 cm. The instrument operates its pulse repetition frequency at 1.9 kHz (low-resolution mode - LRM, real aperture radar) and 17.8 kHz (synthetic aperture radar - SAR).

=== DORIS ===
DORIS (Doppler Orbitography and Radiopositioning Integrated by Satellite) is a receiver for orbit positioning.

=== MWR ===
MWR (MicroWave Radiometer) measures water vapour, cloud water content, and the thermal radiation emitted by the Earth. The MWR sensor has a radiometric accuracy of 3.0 K (3.0 °C; 5.4 °F).

=== LRR ===
LRR (Laser retroreflector) accurately locates the satellite in orbit using a laser ranging system. When used in combination with SRAL, DORIS, MWR, they will acquire detailed topographic measurements of the ocean and in-land water.

=== GNSS ===
GNSS (Global Navigation Satellite System) provides precise orbit determination and can track multiple satellites simultaneously.

== Satellite operation and data flow ==
Sentinel-3 is operated by the European Space Operations Centre (ESA) during the Commissioning Phase (E1) and EUMETSAT from the routine operations phase onwards. The in-orbit operations for Sentinel-3 are managed by EUMETSAT in Darmstadt, Germany. This includes monitoring the health of the satellite and the instruments, and coordinates housekeeping telemetry and commands at the main flight control center in Darmstadt, Germany. EUMETSAT maintains a Back-Up Control Centre in Torrejon, Spain. In addition, the ESA operates an x-band core station in Svalbard, Norway. This station is responsible for receiving the data collected by Sentinel-3. The data is then analysed by the Sentinel Collaborative Ground Segment and compiled into the Copernicus Space Component (CSC). The CSC is an earth observation program run by the ESA with the objective of providing high quality continuous monitoring of the earth. EUMETSAT generates and disseminates the marine and near-real-time atmospheric data from its own facilities in Darmstadt.

== Applications ==
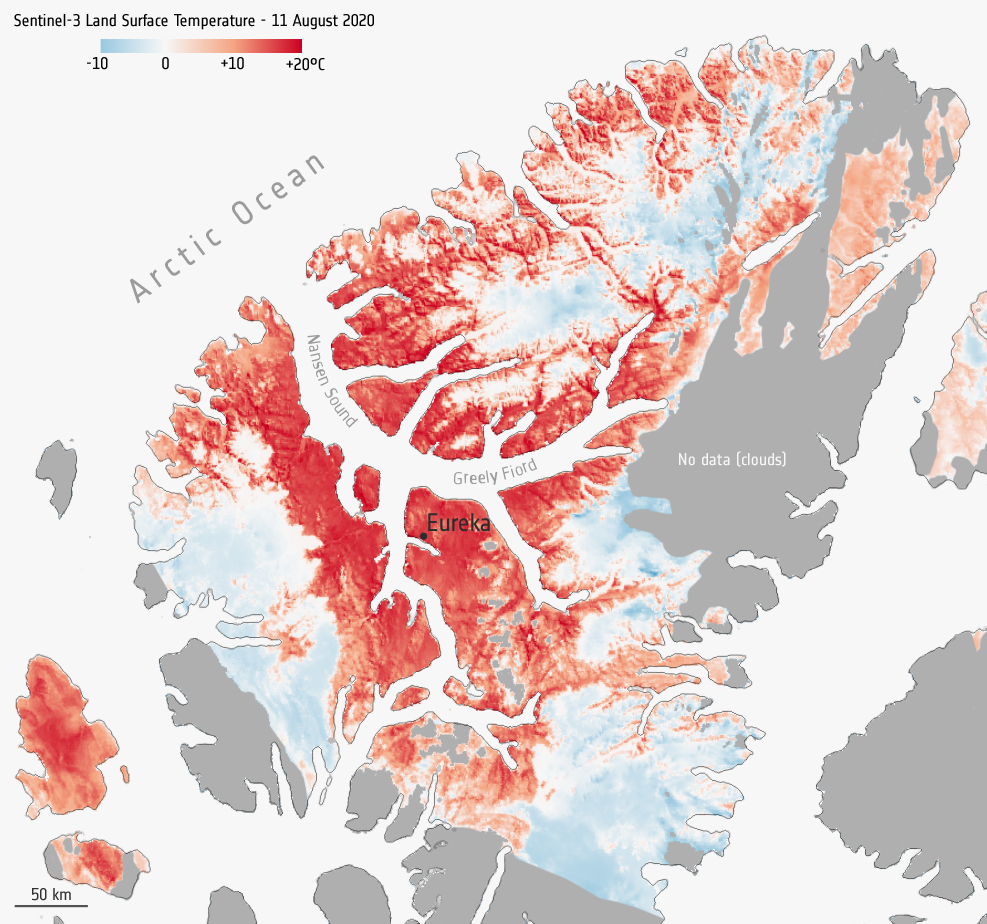
Land temperature of Eureka, Nunavut and its surroundings measured by the SLSTR instrument on August 11, 2020

The applications of Sentinel-3 are diverse. Using the collection of sensors on-board Sentinel-3 is able to detect ocean and land temperature and colour change. The Ocean and Land Color Instrument (OLCI) has a 300 m (980 ft) resolution with 21 distinct bands allowing global coverage in less than four days. This sensor can then be used to by researches to do water quality and land-monitoring research. The satellite also has the ability to monitor the temperature of the sea, land and ice through the Sea and Land Surface Temperature Radiometer (SLSTR). Sentinel-3 also has the ability to detect changes in sea-surface height and sea-ice using the synthetic aperture radar altimeter and the microwave radiometer, two of the most complex sensors on the satellite.

The observations acquired by the mission will be used to in conjunction with other ocean-observing missions to contribute to the Global Ocean Observing System (GOOS) which aims to create a permanent system of ocean observation.

- Ocean colour and land reflectance data
- Sea, land, and ice surface temperature
- Active fire and burnt area monitoring
- Sea surface topography data

== Gallery ==
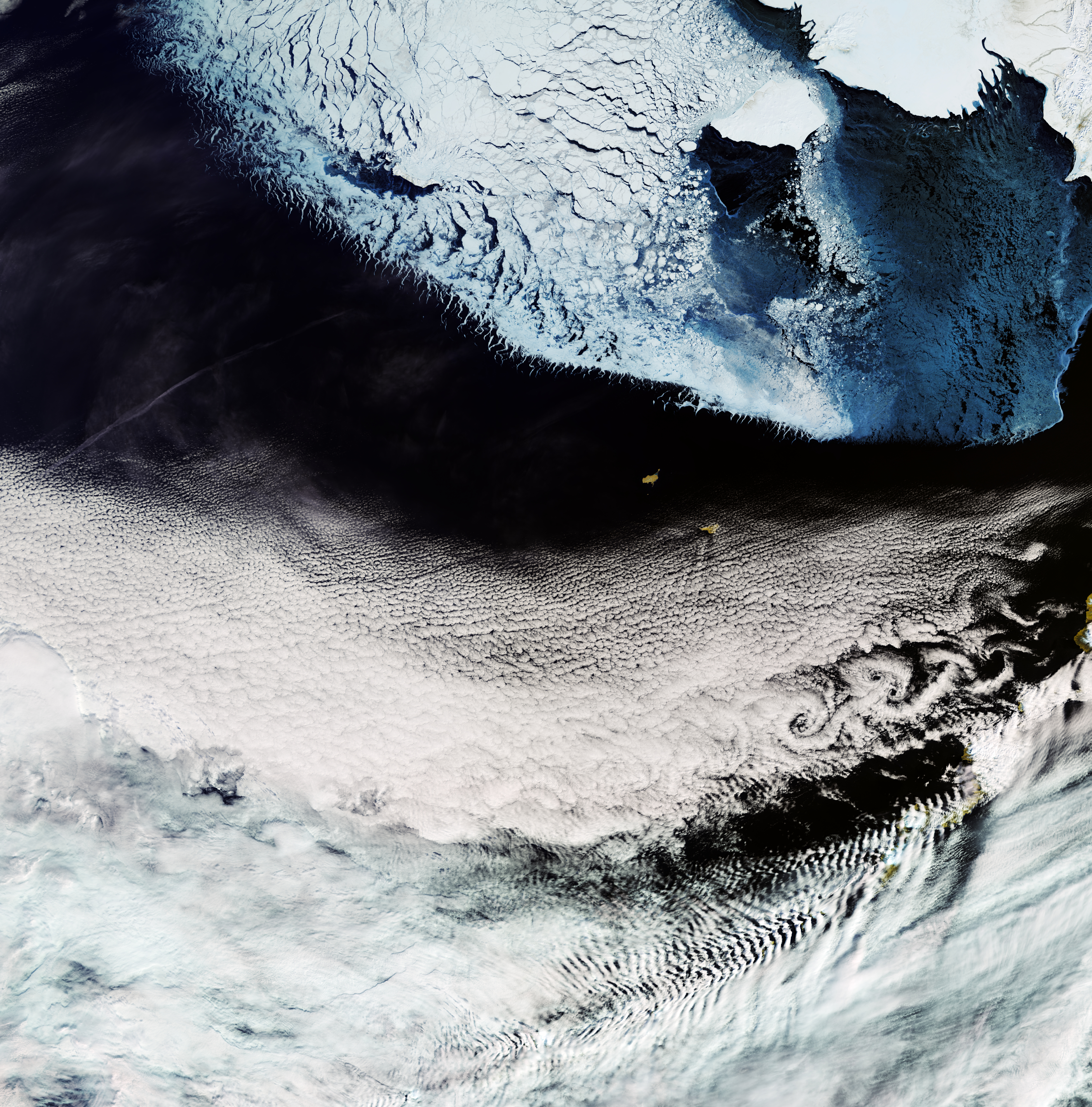
Bering Sea

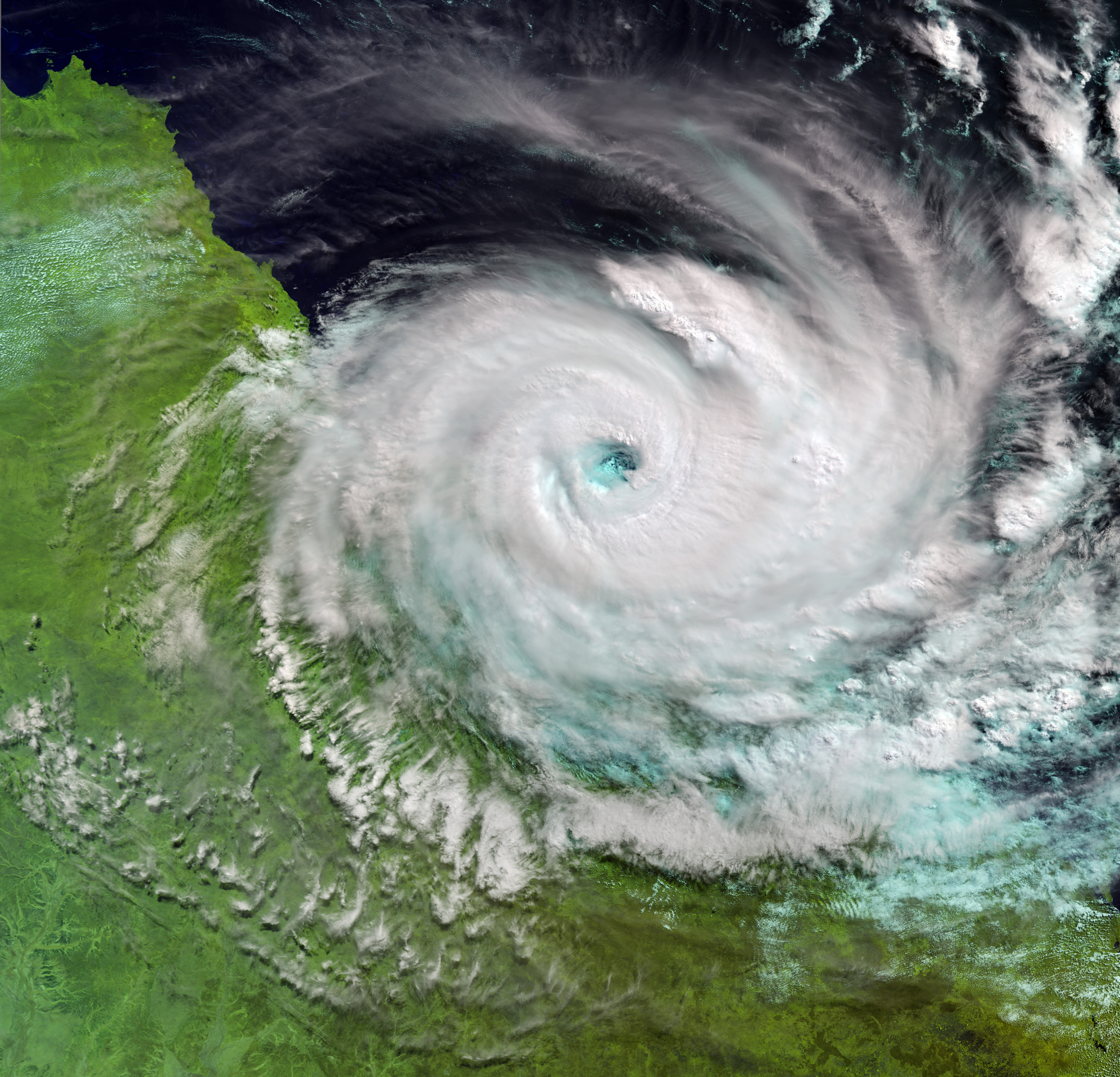
Cyclone Debbie

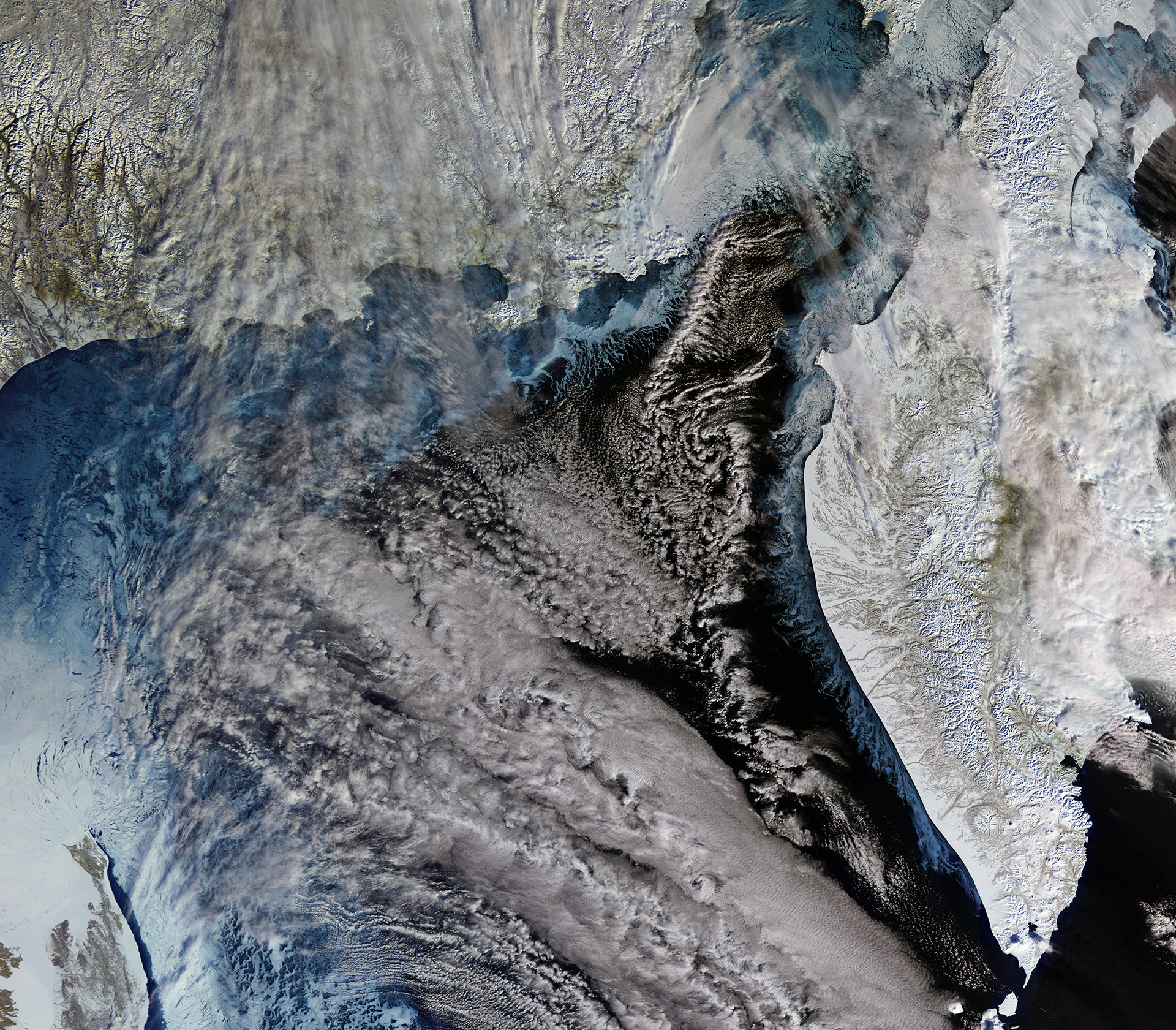
Kamchatka, Russia

United Kingdom

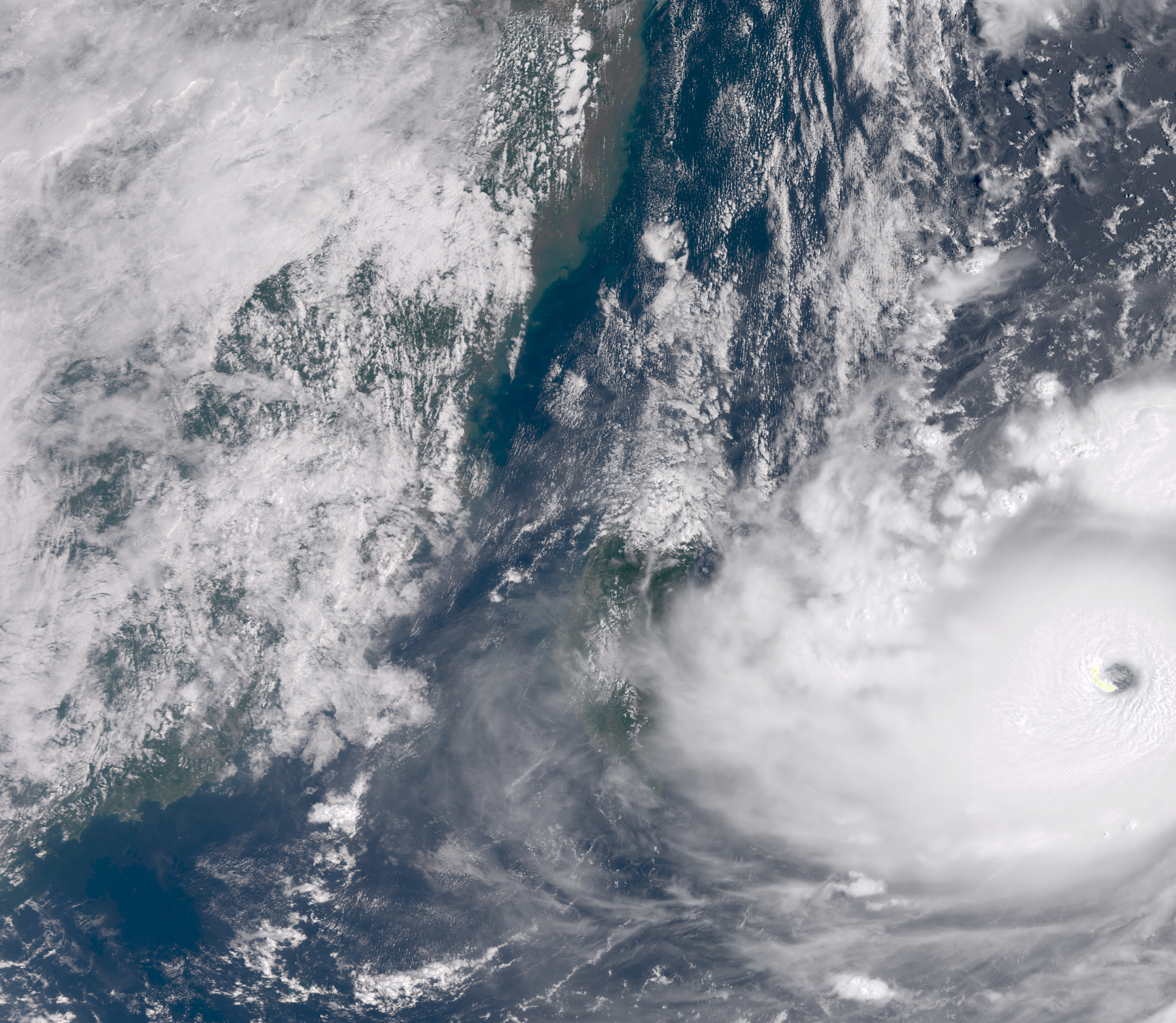
Typhoon Hinnamnor off the coast of Taiwan

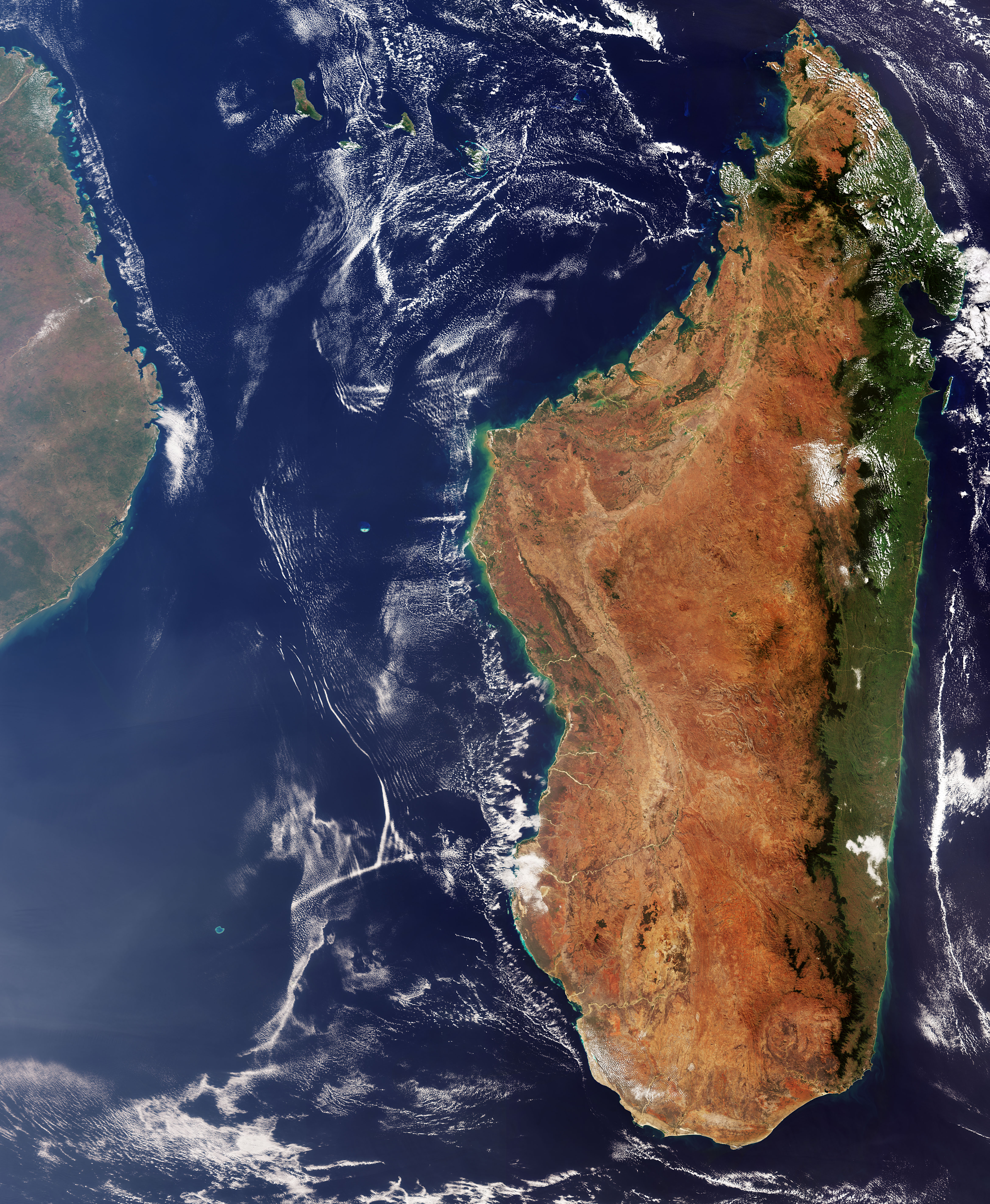
A view of Madagascar and the Mozambique Channel

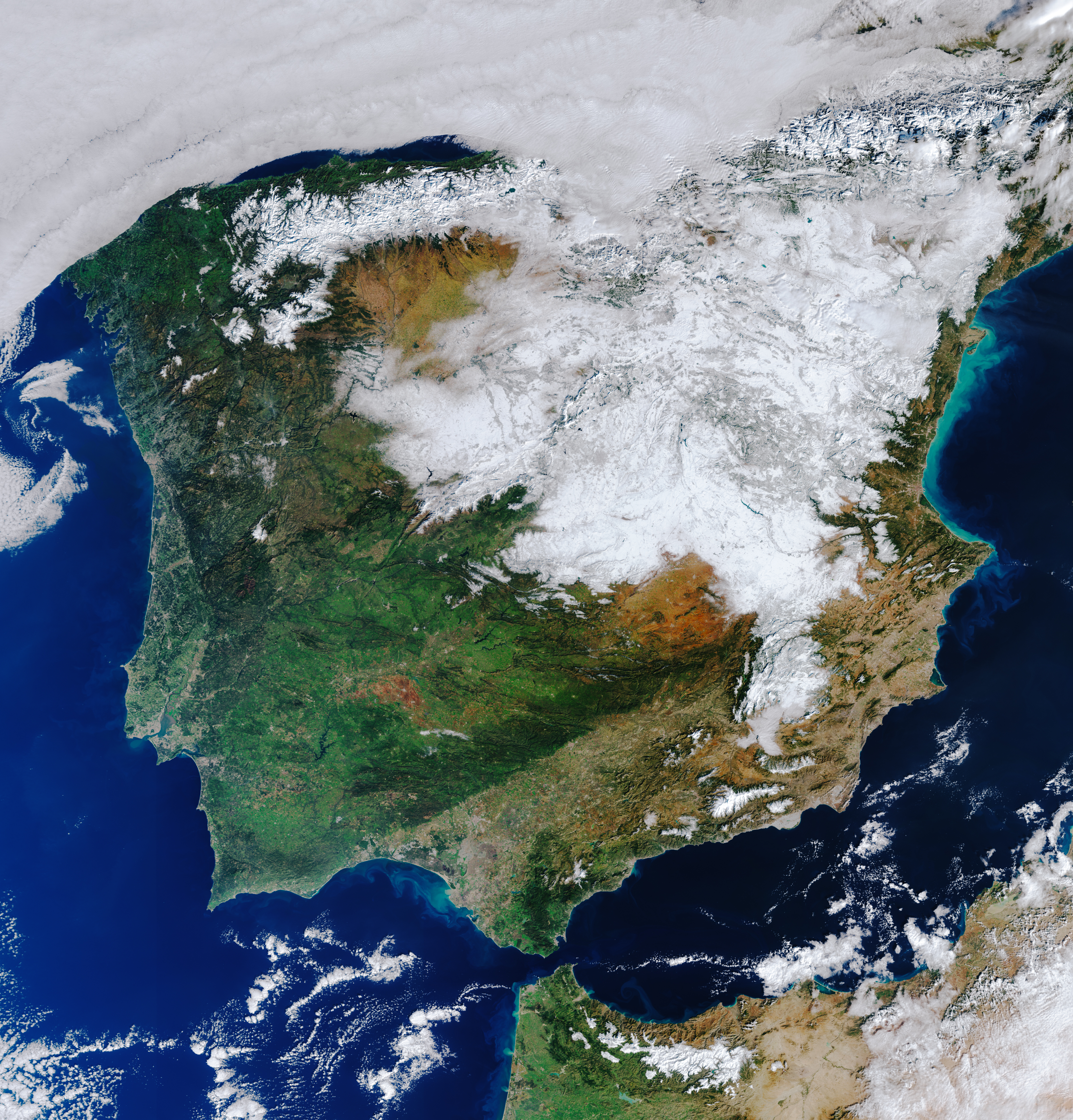
Snowfall from Storm Filomena visible on the Iberian Peninsula in January, 2021
