= 2021 Texas wildfires =

Natural disasters in the USA

The 2021 Texas wildfires were a series of wildfires in Texas in 2021.

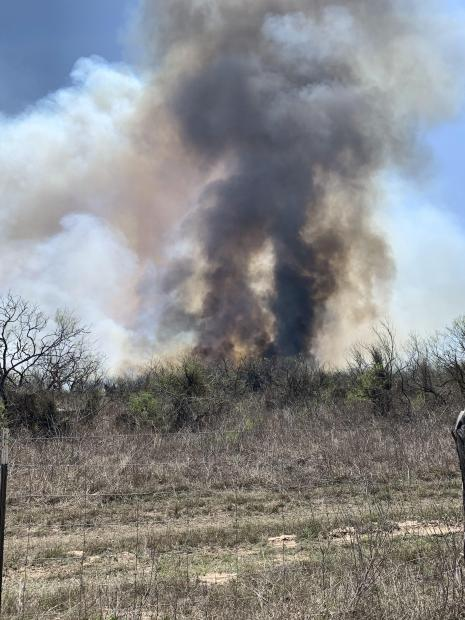
The King Fire on March 19

== Background ==
While "fire season" varies every year in Texas, most wildfires occur in between February and April. However, there is an increasing fire danger all year-round. Fire conditions can be exacerbated by drought, strong winds, La Niña, and vegetation growth. Climate change is leading to increased temperatures, lower humidity levels, and drought conditions that are happening more often.

== List of wildfires ==
A total of 20,478 acres burned in the 2021 Texas wildfires. This is a list of fires that have burned over 1,000 acres.

Name	County	Acres	Start date	Containment date	Notes	Ref
Bent Twig	Shackelford	1,100	February 5	March 8	First large fire of the year	
King	Brooks	11,278	March 17	March 20		
Baffin	Kenedy	4,800	March 20	March 21		
South Rim 4	Brewster	1,341	April 8	May 5		
Dog	Culberson	1,959	May 11	July 6		Lightning-caused
