= Lick Creek Fire =

Ongoing wildfire

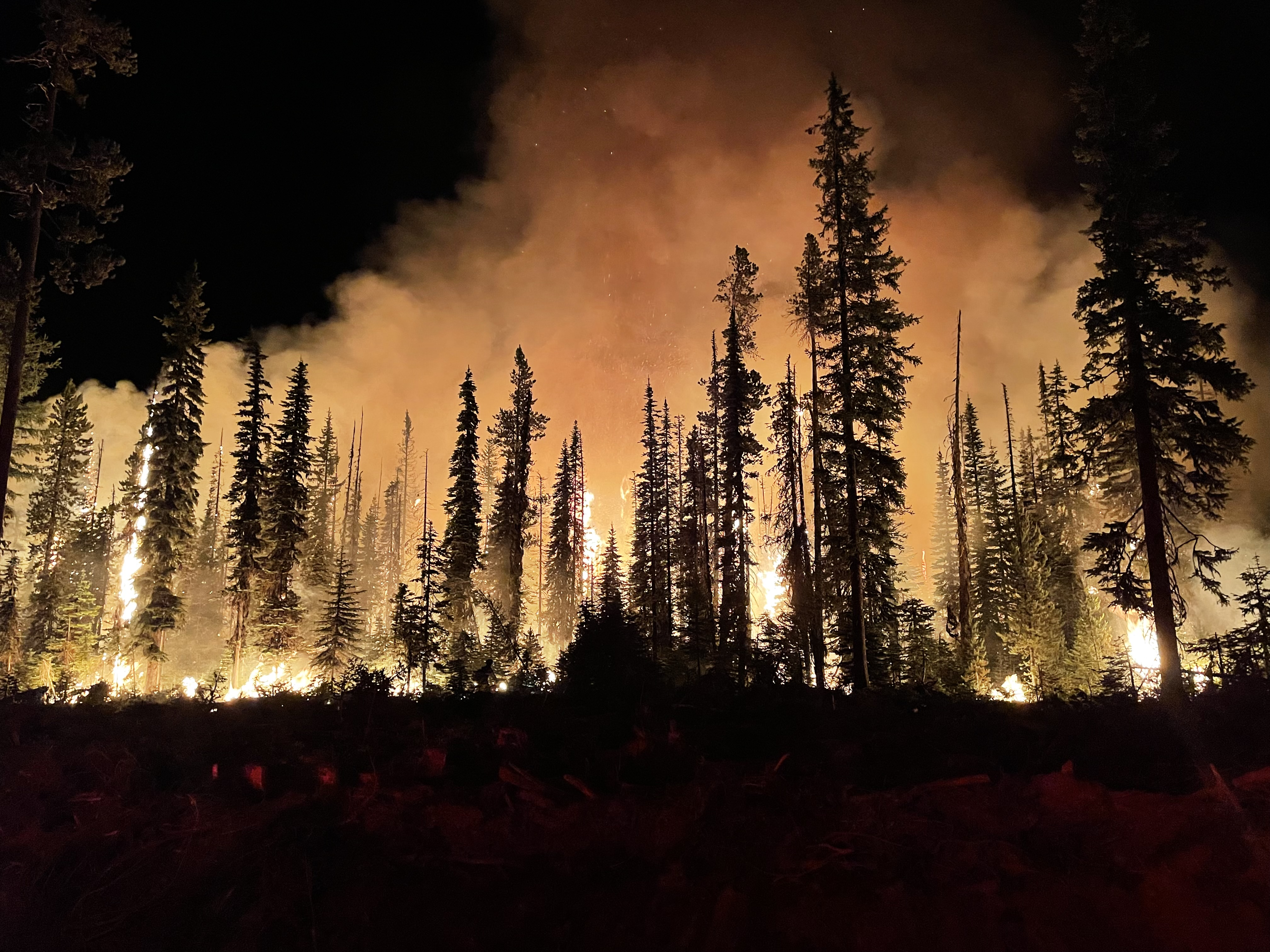
- Date: July 7, 2021 – September 20, 2021
- Location: Asotin and Garfield counties
- Coordinates: 46.262°N 117.416°W

Statistics
- Burned area: 80,421 acres (32,545 ha)

Ignition
- Cause: Lightning

Map
- Location in Southeastern Washington

The Lick Creek Fire was a wildland fire that burned in Asotin and Garfield counties in Washington. The fire burned 80,421 acres (32,545 ha) and was declared 100% contained on September 3, 2021.

The fire combined with the Dry Gulch Fire on July 8 and the two were subsequently managed as one fire. The fire started due to lightning. In early August, the Green Ridge Fire merged with the Lick Creek Fire. On August 9, 2021, it was estimated that the combined area is over 103,000 acres.

== Events ==
=== July ===
The Lick Creek Fire was first reported on July 7, 2021 at around 8:00 AM PDT.

=== Cause ===
The cause of the fire is believed to be due to lightning.

=== Containment ===
As of August 20, 2021, the fire is 97% contained.
