= 2021 Washington wildfires =

Wildfire season

- Date: March 2021–October 2021 Statewide state of emergency: July 6, 2021

Statistics
- Total fires: Over 836 (as of late July)
- Total area: Over 484,045 acres (195,886 ha) (as of August 15)

Impacts
- Structures destroyed: 9 homes

The 2021 Washington wildfire season officially began in March 2021. By late April, all of Eastern Washington had been classified by the United States Drought Monitor as "abnormally dry" with moderate to severe drought conditions. The state had more than 630 wildfires by the first week of July, on par with the state's record 2015 wildfire season.

Washington State Department of Natural Resources (DNR) reported the end of the fire season by October 12, and the DNR and the Northwest Interargency Fire Center reported zero fires in the state on October 14.

== Background ==
While the typical "fire season" in Washington varies every year based on weather conditions, most wildfires occur in between July and October. However, hotter, drier conditions can allow wildfires to start outside of these boundaries. Wildfires tend to start at these times of the year after moisture from winter and spring precipitation dries up. Vegetation and overall conditions are the hottest and driest in these periods. The increase of vegetation can make the fires spread easier.

== Fires ==
The month of April had more fires than the previous year, and a year-to-date record 410 fires occurred on state-managed lands by the second week of June.

The Joseph Canyon Fire burned on both sides of the Oregon–Washington border during June. It was ignited by lightning during the night of June 3–4.

The Hair Road Fire in Walla Walla County south of Lower Monumental Dam grew to 10,000 acres before being contained on June 21.

A brush fire near Lind in Adams County was ignited on the morning of June 27 and grew to 20,000 acres the same day. It resulted in the closure of Washington State Route 21. By June 29, it was 100% contained.

The Cedar Hills Fire began on June 28 near the Seattle suburb of Issaquah and grew to over 30 acres, involving Eastside Fire and Rescue and state firefighting resources.

Smoke from British Columbia fires that occurred during the 2021 Western North America heat wave began to enter Washington in early July.

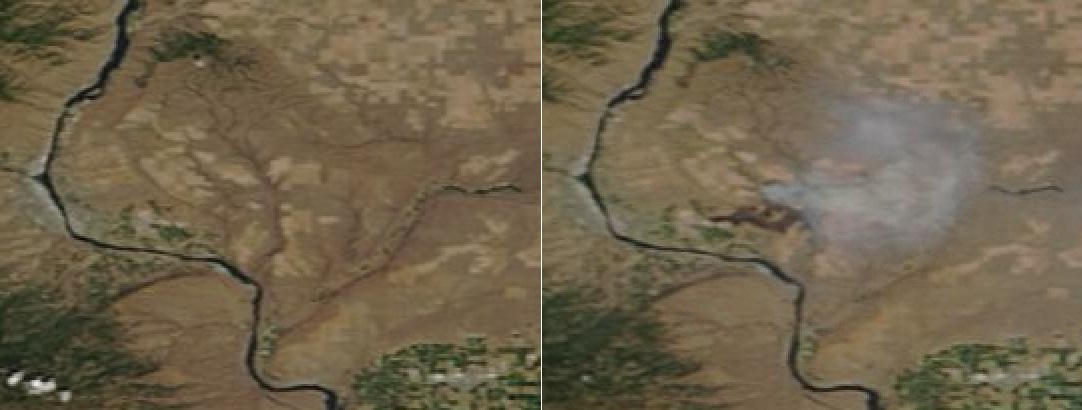
Batterman Fire: Satellite image of Wenatchee, Washington area on July 3 before the fire and July 5 showing smoke plume and 10 km long burn scar south of Badger Mountain

The Batterman Fire in Douglas County near East Wenatchee (47.409°N 120.176°W) began on Independence Day in the hills above Pangborn Memorial Airport. By July 6, it had burned 14,375 acres (5,817 ha), and many residents had been ordered to evacuate. Batterman Road and Rock Island Grade Road along Rock Island Creek were closed. The fire was reported fully contained on July 12, with a revised burned area of 14,100 acres (5,700 ha).

The governor declared a state of emergency on July 6.

The 300+ acre Andrus Road fire in the Spokane suburbs drew firefighters from as far away as Thurston and Lewis County in Western Washington, hundreds of miles away.

Lightning on July 7 ignited many fires in Eastern Washington including the Asotin Complex Fire near Clarkston which grew to several hundred acres before the end of the day. The Dry Gulch Fire, part of the complex, grew to over 38,000 acres by July 10 and was burning in rugged terrain with heavy fuels. By July 12, it had reached 55,055 acres. The Lick Creek and Dry Gulch fires were administratively merged on July 12, with a combined 63,533 acres (25,711 ha) reported July 14. By July 22, the Lick Creek Fire was 76,167 acres in size. By July 26, it was 90% contained.

On July 12, the Burbank Fire burning around Burbank Creek in the Yakima River Canyon and extending into the Yakima Training Center reached 12,000 acres (4,900 ha). It was declared contained on July 14 after 13,000 acres burned.

A portion of the North Cascades Highway was closed due to the Cedar Creek Fire on July 12. It was to remain closed for at least several days as the Varden Fire nearby grew to several hundred acres. The fires merged and reached 2,900 acres on July 15. The fire grew to 18,634 acres by July 21, to 20,806 acres by July 23, and had grown to 52,030 acres by August 4.

Until July, no heavy smoke events had impacted ground-level air quality in the state's largest cities of Seattle and Spokane in Western Washington and Eastern Washington respectively, but there was the possibility of smoke entering the state from large Western fires like the Oregon Bootleg Fire. On July 13, Spokane media reported smoke had begun to affect the air, becoming "unhealthy for some".

The Summit Trail Fire was started by lightning on the Colville reservation on July 12 and grew to over 4,000 acres (1,600 ha) by July 19. By July 22, it was almost 6,000 acres, and by July 26, it was 11,256 acres.

Seven homes were lost in the Chuweah Creek Fire at Nespelem, Washington on July 12–13, which caused evacuation of the town and burned over 10,000 acres (4,000 ha). The fire grew to 22,900 acres by July 15, and over 37,000 acres by July 16; the town of Keller, Washington was also evacuated. The fire was 97% contained by August 9.

The Red Apple Fire, caused by an illegal burn around 47.5016°N 120.4194°W in Cashmere, prompted evacuation of hundreds of residents in the Wenatchee area July 13–14, including "leave now" orders for some. U.S. Route 97 Alternate was closed on July 14 due to the fire. The fire grew to 9,000 acres on July 14 and people in over 1,000 homes were told to evacuate. On July 15 it was 11,000 acres, and evacuations were ordered for 1,500 homes. It was 90% contained by July 19.

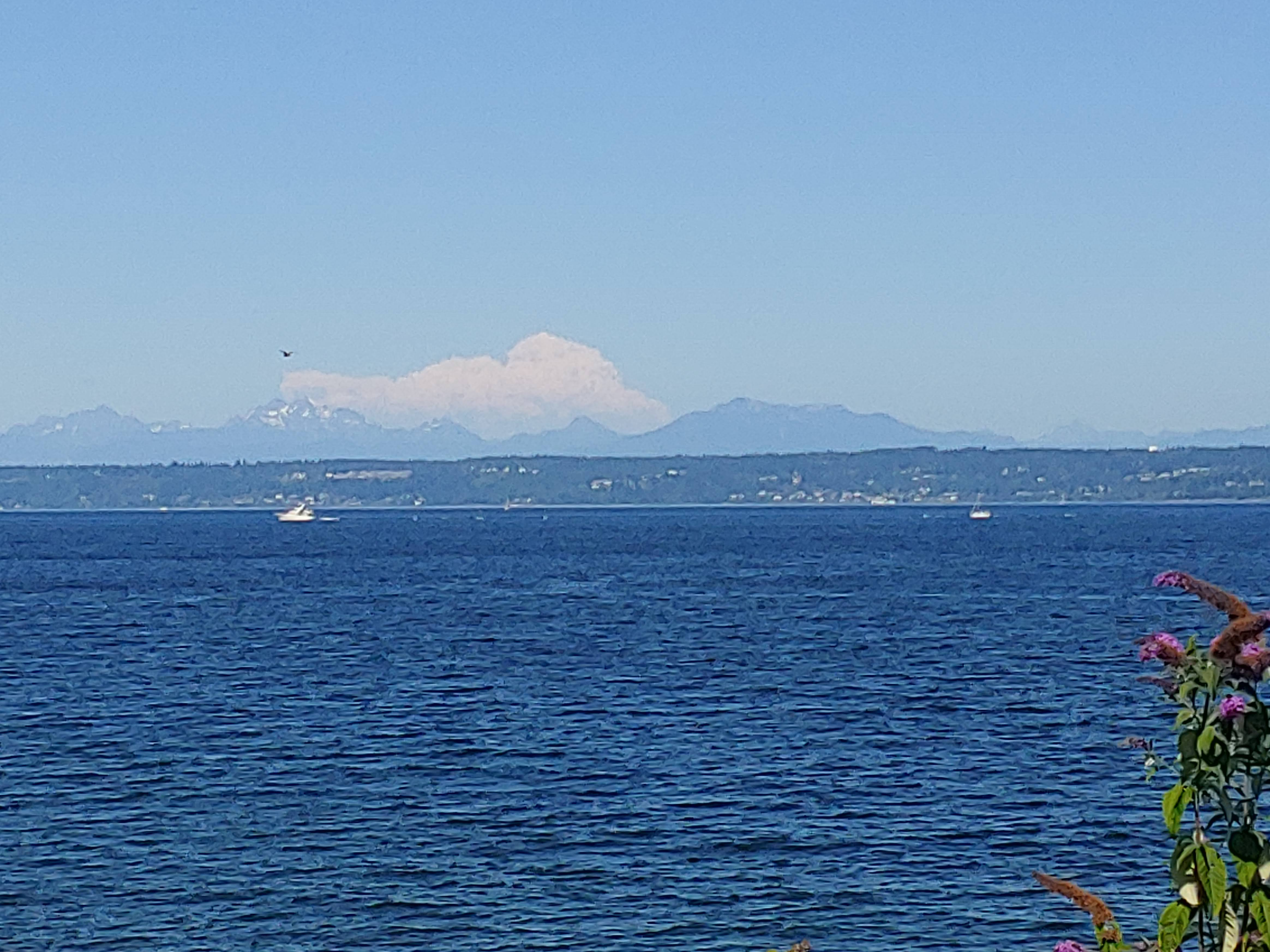
Pyrocumulus clouds from the Cub Creek Fire seen from Kingston, Washington 115 miles (185 km) distant

The Cub Creek 2 Fire broke out north of Winthrop in the Okanogan-Wenatchee National Forest and Washington DNR lands on July 16. Evacuations were ordered around Winthrop on July 17. It grew to 4,690 acres by the end of the day on July 18, affecting air quality in Twisp and elsewhere in the Methow Valley. The air quality index in Twisp was rated hazardous on July 19. On the morning of July 20, the fire had grown to 32,473 acres and was 5% contained. The National Weather Service posted images of pyrocumulus clouds generated by Cub Creek, visible from the agency's Seattle office over 110 miles (180 km) away. Two dwellings were destroyed by July 20. The fire grew to over 40,000 acres (16,000 ha) by July 23, and over 44,000 acres by July 26, 52,387 acres by July 28, and 58,793 acres by August 3.

All state forest lands in Eastern Washington were closed to the public on July 20 due to fire danger.

Due to ongoing and widespread PM_{2.5} particulate content in the air from multiple wildfires, children, the very old or pregnant, and other residents with respiratory conditions in parts of Okanogan County were advised in July to leave the area for their health. Air quality in the Methow Valley was the unhealthiest in the nation at several points in July. The U.S. National Weather Service Spokane office tweeted that Methow Valley's air quality could be the worst anywhere on the Earth on July 23.

The Schneider Springs Fire rose near Naches, Washington during a thunderstorm on August 4. It caused poor air quality across Eastern Washington and in Puget Sound region around August 12. By August 18 it had grown to 31,868 acres.

The Twenty-Five Mile Fire started near Twenty-Five Mile Creek State Park on August 15.

=== List of notable fires ===
The following is a list of fires that burned more than 1,000 acres (400 ha), or produced significant structural damage or casualties.

Name	County	Size	Start date	Containment date (Note: Containment means that fire crews have established and secured control lines around the fire's perimeter. These lines are artificial barriers, like trenches or cleared vegetation, designed to stop the fire's spread, or natural barriers like rivers. Containment reflects progress in managing the fire but does not necessarily mean the fire is starved of fuel, under control, or put out.)	Statistics reference	Cause	Notes	Images
Lind	Chelan	20,000 acres (8,100 ha)	June 27	June 29				
Joseph Canyon	Asotin	7,610 acres (3,080 ha)(including Oregon)	June 4	June 21		Lightning		
Batterman	Douglas	14,100 acres (5,700 ha)	July 4	July 12				
Green Ridge	Garfield & Columbia	42,722 acres (17,289 ha)	July 7					
Lick Creek (Dry Gulch)	Asotin	80,421 acres (32,545 ha)	July 7	August 14		Lightning		
Burbank	Yakima	13,000 acres (5,300 ha)	July 10	July 14				
Cedar Creek	Okanogan	55,572 acres (22,489 ha)	July 11			Lightning	Temporarily closed the North Cascades Highway	
Summit Trail	Okanagan	49,329 acres (19,963 ha)	July 12			Lightning		
Chuweah Creek	Okanagan	36,752 acres (14,873 ha)	July 12	August 9		Lightning	Dwellings lost, Keller and Nespelem evacuated	
Red Apple	Chelan	12,228 acres (4,948 ha)	July 13	July 18 (90%)		Human	Over 1,500 homes told to evacuate	
Cub Creek 2	Okanogan	70,186 acres (28,403 ha)	July 16				Hazardous air quality in Twisp; dwellings lost	
Whitmore	Okanogan	58,280 acres (23,590 ha)	August 3			Lightning	As many as 500 residences were under Level 2 evacuations	
Walker Creek/Spur	Okanogan	23,331 acres (9,442 ha)	August 3			Lightning	Merged with Spur Fire; Regional evacuations from Lake Bonaparte north past Lost Lake	
Schneider Springs	Yakima	101,633 acres (41,129 ha)	August 4			Lightning	Caused poor air quality in Eastern Washington and the Puget Sound region. The largest fire of the year.	
Twenty-Five Mile	Chelan	21,380 acres (8,650 ha)	August 15				Caused evacuations and loss of one home; countywide state of emergency declared	

== See also ==
- List of Washington wildfires
