= Sentinel-3B =

ESA Earth observation satellite

- Vector drawing of the Sentinel-3
- Mission type: Earth observation
- Operator: ESA · EUMETSAT
- COSPAR ID: 2018-039A
- SATCAT no.: 43437
- Website: Sentinel-3 (ESA)
- Mission duration: Planned: 7 years Elapsed: 8 years, 18 days

Spacecraft properties
- Spacecraft type: Sentinel-3
- Bus: Prima
- Manufacturer: Thales Alenia Space
- Launch mass: 1,250 kg (2,756 lb)
- Dry mass: 1,150 kg (2,535 lb)
- Dimensions: 3.9 × 2.2 × 2.2 m (12.8 × 7.2 × 7.2 ft)
- Power: 2,300 watts

Start of mission
- Launch date: 25 April 2018, 17:57:51 UTC
- Rocket: Rokot/Briz-KM
- Launch site: Plesetsk Cosmodrome, Site 133
- Contractor: Eurockot Launch Services

Orbital parameters
- Reference system: Geocentric
- Regime: Sun-synchronous
- Semi-major axis: 7,180.77 km (4,461.92 mi)
- Eccentricity: 0.0001027
- Perigee altitude: 801.90 km (498.28 mi)
- Apogee altitude: 803.38 km (499.20 mi)
- Inclination: 98.6276°
- Period: 100.93 min
- RAAN: 183.84°
- Argument of perigee: 96.39°
- Mean motion: 14.26 rev/day
- Repeat interval: 27 days
- Epoch: 25 April 2018, 20:50:15 UTC

Transponders
- Band: S band (TT&C support); X band (science data)
- Bandwidth: S band: 64 kbit/s uplink, 1 Mbit/s downlink X band: 2 × 280 Mbit/s
Instruments
- OLCI: Ocean and Land Colour Instrument
- SLSTR: Sea and Land Surface Temperature Radiometer
- SRAL: Synthetic Aperture Radar Altimeter
- MWR: Microwave Radiometer
- DORIS: Doppler Orbitography and Radiopositioning Integrated by Satellite
- LRR: Laser Retro-Reflector
- GNSS: Global Navigation Satellite System

Sentinel-3B is a European Earth observation satellite dedicated to oceanography which launched on 25 April 2018. It was built as a part of the Copernicus Programme, and is the second (after Sentinel-3A, launched 16 February 2016) of four planned Sentinel-3 satellites.

== Launch ==
Sentinel-3B was successfully launched on 25 April 2018 at 17:57 UTC from the Plesetsk Cosmodrome aboard a Rokot launch vehicle.

== See also ==
- Sentinel-3#Instruments
