= List of OSCAR satellites =

This is a list of OSCAR satellites.

According to AMSAT, as of 11 June 2025, 125 satellites were launched, each receiving an OSCAR number upon reaching orbit. The names of the satellites in the following table are sorted chronologically by launch date. The OSCAR numbering does not always correspond to the launch date, as this identifier was sometimes assigned some time after launch. The status refers to the amateur radio payload and may not match the status of the satellite's primary payload.

== Table ==
No.	Name(s)	Start	Launch vehicle	Country	Operator	SCN	Status	COSPAR-ID
1	OSCAR; OSCAR 1	1961-12-12	Thor-DM21; Agena-B	USA	Project OSCAR	00214	AE: 1962-01-31	1961-034B
2	OSCAR II; OSCAR 2	1962-06-02	Thor-DM21; Agena-B	USA	Project OSCAR	00305	AE: 1962-06-21	1962-022B
3	OSCAR III; OSCAR 3	1965-03-09	Thor-DSV2A; Agena-D	USA	Project OSCAR	01293	Ceased operations	1965-016F
4	OSCAR IV; OSCAR 4	1965-12-21	Titan IIIC	USA	TRW Radio Club of Redondo Beach	01902	AE: 1976-04-12	1965-108C
5	Australis-OSCAR 5; OSCAR 5; AO-5; AO-A	1970-01-23	Delta-N6	AUS	Melbourne Uni	04321	Ceased operations	1970-008B
6	AMSAT-OSCAR 6; OSCAR 6; AO-6; AO-C; Phase 2A; P2A	1972-10-15	Delta-300	USA	AMSAT-NA	06236	Ceased operations	1972-082B
7	AMSAT-OSCAR 7; OSCAR 7; AO-7; AO-B; Phase 2B; P2B	1974-11-15	Delta-2310	USA	AMSAT-NA	07530	Operational	1974-089B
8	OSCAR 8; AMSAT-OSCAR 8; AO-8; AO-D; Phase 2D; P2D	1978-03-05	Delta-2910	USA	AMSAT-NA	10703	Ceased operations	1978-026B
9	UoSAT-OSCAR 9; UoSAT 1; UO-9; UoSAT 1; UoSAT-A	1981-10-06	Delta-2310	UK	Surrey Uni	12888	AE: 1989-10-13	1981-100B
10	OSCAR 10; AMSAT-OSCAR 10; Phase 3B; P3B	1983-06-16	Ariane 1	GER; USA	AMSAT-DL; AMSAT-NA	14129	Ceased operations	1983-058B
11	UoSAT-OSCAR 11; OSCAR 11; UO-11; UoSAT 2; UoSAT-B	1984-03-01	Delta-3920	UK	Surrey Uni	14781	Partially operational	1984-021B
12	Fuji-OSCAR 12; OSCAR 12; FO-12; JAS 1; Fuji 1	1986-08-12	H-I	JPN	JARL; JAMSAT	16909	Ceased operations	1986-061B
13	AMSAT-OSCAR 13; OSCAR 13; AO-13; Phase 3C; P3C	1988-06-15	Ariane-44LP	GER; USA	AMSAT-DL; AMSAT-NA	19216	AE; 1996-12-06	1988-051B
14	UoSAT-OSCAR 14; OSCAR 14; UO-14; UoSAT 3; UoSAT-D	1990-01-22	Ariane-40	UK	Surrey Uni	20437	Ceased operations	1990-005B
15	UoSAT-OSCAR 15; OSCAR 15; UO-15; UoSAT 4; UoSAT-E	1990-01-22	Ariane-40	UK	Surrey Uni	20438	Ceased operations	1990-005C
16	AMSAT-OSCAR 16; OSCAR 16; AO-16; Pacsat; Microsat-1	1990-01-22	Ariane-40	USA	AMSAT-NA	20439	Ceased operations	1990-005D
17	DOVE-OSCAR 17; OSCAR 17; DO-17; DOVE; Microsat-2	1990-01-22	Ariane-40	BRA	BRAMSAT; AMSAT-NA	20440	Ceased operations	1990-005E
18	WEBERSAT-OSCAR 18; OSCAR 18; WO-18; WeberSAT; Microsat-3	1990-01-22	Ariane-40	USA	Weber Uni; AMSAT-NA	20441	Ceased operations	1990-005F
19	LUSAT-OSCAR 19; OSCAR 19; LO-19; LUSAT; Microsat-4	1990-01-22	Ariane-40	ARG	AMSAT-LU; AMSAT-NA	20442	Ceased operations	1990-005G
20	Fuji-OSCAR 20; FO-20; JAS 1B; Fuji-2	1990-02-07	H-I	JPN	JARL	20480	Ceased operations	1990-013C
21	AMSAT-OSCAR 21; AO-21; Informator-1; RS-14	1991-01-29	Kosmos-3M	USSR; GER	AMSAT-U-Orbita; AMSAT-DL	21087	Ceased operations	1991-006A
22	UoSAT-OSCAR 22; OSCAR 22UO-22; UoSAT 5; UoSAT-F	1991-07-17	Ariane-40	UK	Surrey Uni	21575	Ceased operations	1991-050B
23	KitSAT-OSCAR 23; OSCAR 23; KO-23; KitSat 1; Uribyol-1	1992-08-10	Ariane-42P	KOR	KAIST; SSTL	22077	Ceased operations	1992-052B
24	Arsene-OSCAR 24; OSCAR 24; AO-24; Arsene	1993-05-12	Ariane-42L	FRA	Radio Amateur Club de l'Espace	22654	Ceased operations	1993-031B
25	KitSAT-OSCAR 25; KO-25; KITSAT B; Kitsat-2; Uribyol-2	1993-09-26	Ariane-40	KOR	KAIST	22828	Ceased operations	1993-061F
26	Italy-OSCAR 26; IO-26; ITAMSAT	1993-09-26	Ariane-40	ITA	AMSAT-Italien; ARI	22826	Ceased operations	1993-061D
27	AMRAD-OSCAR 27; AO-27; EYESAT-1	1993-09-26	Ariane-40	USA	AMRAD	22825	Ceased operations	1993-061C
28	POSAT-OSCAR 28; PO-28; POSAT; Posat-1	1993-09-26	Ariane-40	PRT	AMSAT-PO; SSTL; LNET-Portugal	22829	Ceased operations	1993-061G
29	Fuji-OSCAR 29; FO-29; JAS 2; Fuji-2	1996-08-17	H-II	JPN	JARL	24278	Partially operational	1996-046B
30	Mexico-OSCAR 30; MO-30; UNAMSAT-2; UNAMSAT B	1996-09-05	Kosmos-3M	MEX	UNAM	24305	Ceased operations	1996-052B
31	TMSAT-OSCAR 31; TO-31; TMSAT-1	1998-07-10	Zenit-2	THA		25396	Ceased operations	1998-043C
32	Gurwin-OSCAR 32; GO-32; Gurwin-1b; Techsat-1b	1998-07-10	Zenit-2	ISR	Technion	25397	Ceased operations	1998-043D
33	SEDSAT-OSCAR 33; SO-33; SEDSAT-1	1998-10-24	Delta-7326	USA	Alabama Uni; SEDS	25509	Ceased operations	1998-061B
34	Pansat-OSCAR 34; PO-34; PANSAT	1998-10-30	Space Shuttle	USA	Naval Postgraduate School	25520	Ceased operations	1998-064B
35	OSCAR 35; SO-35; SUNSAT	1999-02-23	Delta-7920-10	ZAF	Stellenbosch Uni	25636	Ceased operations	1999-008C
36	UoSAT-OSCAR 36; UO 36; UoSAT 12	1999-04-21	Dnepr	UK	SSTL	25693	Ceased operations	1999-021A
37	ASU-OSCAR 37; AO-37; ASUSat-1	2000-01-27	Minotaur I	USA	Arizona Uni	26065	Ceased operations	2000-004E
38	OPAL-OSCAR 38; OO-38; Orbiting Picosat Automatic Launcher	2000-01-27	Minotaur I	USA	Stanford	26063	Ceased operations	2000-004C
39	Weber-OSCAR 39; WO-39; JAWSAT	2000-01-27	Minotaur I	USA	Weber Uni; USAF	26061	Ceased operations	2000-004A
41	Saudi-OSCAR 41; SO-41; Saudisat 1A	2000-09-26	Dnepr	SAU	KACST Space Research Institute	26545	Ceased operations	2000-057A
42	Saudi-OSCAR 42; SO-42; Saudisat 1B	2000-09-26	Dnepr	SAU	KACST Space Research Institute	26549	Ceased operations	2000-057E
46	Malaysian-OSCAR 46; MO-46; TiungSAT-1	2000-09-26	Dnepr	MYS		26548	Ceased operations	2000-057D
40	AMSAT-OSCAR 40; AO-40; Phase 3D; P3D	2000-11-16	Ariane-5G	GER; USA	AMSAT-DL	26609	Ceased operations	2000-072B
43	Starshine-OSCAR 43; SO-43; Starshine 3	2001-09-30	Athena-1	USA	Gil Moore und Schüler	26929	AE: 2003-01-21	2001-043A
44	Navy-OSCAR 44; NO-44; PCSat	2001-09-30	Athena-1	USA	U.S. Naval Academy	26931	Ceased operations	2001-043C
45	Navy-OSCAR 45; NO-45; SAPPHIRE	2001-09-30	Athena-1	USA	U.S. Naval Academy; Stanford	26932	Ceased operations	2001-043D
47	BreizhSAT-OSCAR 47; BO-47; IDEFIX CU1	2002-05-04	Ariane-42P	FRA	AMSAT-France	27422	Ceased operations	2002-021B
48	BreizhSAT-OSCAR 48; BO-48; IDEFIX CU2	2002-05-04	Ariane-42P	FRA	AMSAT-France	27422	Ceased operations	2002-021B
49	AATiS-OSCAR 49; AO-49; Rubin 2; Safir-M	2002-12-20	Dnepr	GER	AATiS e. V.	27605	Ceased operations	2002-058A
50	Saudi-OSCAR 50; SO-50; Saudisat-1C	2002-12-20	Dnepr	SAU	KACST Space Research Institute	27607	Operational	2002-058C
55	CubeSat-OSCAR 55; CO-55; CUTE-1	2003-06-30	Rockot-KM	JPN	Tokyo Inst. Tech.	27844	Operational	2003-031E
57	CubeSat-OSCAR 57; CO-57; XI-IV	2003-06-30	Rockot-KM	JPN	Tokio Uni	27848	Operational	2003-031J
51	AMSAT-OSCAR 51; AO-51; AMSAT-Echo	2004-06-29	Dnepr	USA	AMSAT-NA	28375	Ceased operations	2004-025K
52	VUSat-OSCAR 52; VO-52; Hamsat; VUSat	2005-05-05	PSLV	IND; NLD	AMSAT-India; ISRO	28650	Ceased operations	2005-017B
54	AMSAT-OSCAR 54; AO-54; SuitSat; Radioskaf	2005-09-08	Kosmos-3M	Int.	ARISS	28933	AE: 2006-09-07	2005-035C
53	eXpress-OSCAR 53; XO-53; SSETI Express	2005-10-27	Kosmos-3M	Int.	ESA; AMSAT-UK	28894	Ceased operations	2005-043E
58	CubeSat-OSCAR 58; CO-58; XI-V	2005-10-27		JPN	Tokio Uni	28895	Operational	2005-043F
56	CubeSat-OSCAR 56; CO-56; CUTE-1.7 + APD	2006-02-21	M-V	JPN	Tokyo Inst. Tech.	28941	AE: 2009-10-25	2006-005C
59	HITSAT-OSCAR 59; HO-59; HITSAT	2006-09-22	M-V	JPN	Hokkaido Inst. Tech.	29484	AE: 2008-06-18	2006-041F
60	Navy-OSCAR 60; NO-60; RAFT	2006-12-21	Space Shuttle	USA	U.S. Naval Academy	29661	AE: 2007-05-30	2006-055C
61	Navy-OSCAR 61; NO-61; ANDE-MAA (Mock ANDE Active)	2006-12-21	Space Shuttle	USA	U.S. Naval Research Lab.	29664	AE: 2007-12-25	2006-055F
62	Navy-OSCAR 62; NO-62; ANDE-MAA (Fence Calibration)	2006-12-21	Space Shuttle	USA	U.S. Naval Research Lab.	29667	AE: 2008-05-25	2006-055J
63	Pehuensat-OSCAR 63; PO-63; Pehuensat-1	2007-10-01	PSLV	ARG	Comahue Uni; AMSAT-LU	29712	AE: 2023-01-16	2007-001D
64	Dutch-OSCAR 64; DO-64; Delfi-C3	2008-04-28	PSLV-CA	NLD	Delft Univ of Tech.	32789	AE: 2023-11-14	2008-021G
65	CubeSat-OSCAR 65; CO-65; CUTE-1.7 + APD II	2008-04-28	PSLV-CA	JPN	Tokyo Inst. Tech.	32785	Partially operational	2008-021C
66	CubeSat-OSCAR 66; CO-66; SEEDS 2	2008-04-28	PSLV-CA	JPN	Nihon-Uni	32791	Operational	2008-021J
67	SumbandilaSat-OSCAR 67; SO-67; SumbandilaSat	2009-09-17	Sojus-2.1b / Fregat	ZAF	AMSAT Südafrika	35870	AE: 2021-12-10	2009-049F
68	Hope-OSCAR 68; HO-68; XW-1	2009-12-15	CZ-4C	CHN	C-AMSAT	36122	Partially operational	2009-072B
69	FASTRAC-OSCAR 69; FO-69; FASTRAC 1	2010-11-20	Minotaur IV HAPS	USA	Texas Uni (Austin)	37227	Ceased operations	2010-062F
70	FASTRAC-OSCAR 70; FO-70; FASTRAC 2	2010-11-20	Minotaur IV HAPS	USA	Texas Uni (Austin)	37380	Ceased operations	2010-062M
71	AubieSat-OSCAR 71; AO-71; AubieSat-1	2011-10-28	Delta-7920-10C	USA	Auburn Uni	37854	AE: 2024-06-01	2011-061E
72	MagyarSat-OSCAR 72; MO-72; Masat-1	2012-02-13	Vega	HUN	Budapest Uni of Tech.	38081	AE: 2015-01-09	2012-006E
75	Louisiana-OSCAR 75; LO-75; CAPE 2	2013-11-20	Minotaur	USA	Louisiana Uni (Lafayette)	39382	AE: 2014-10-23	2013-064C
73	AMSAT-OSCAR 73; AO-73; FUNcube-1	2013-11-21	Dnepr	UK	AMSAT-UK	39444	Operational	2013-066AE
74	LUSAT-OSCAR 74; LO-74; CubeBug-2	2013-11-21	Dnepr	ARG	AMSAT-LU	39440	Operational	2013-066AA
76	Morehead-OSCAR 76; MO-76; $50SAT; Eagle-2	2013-11-21	Dnepr	USA	Morehead State Uni	39436	AE: 2018-05-19	2013-066W
77	Cubesat-OSCAR 77; CO-77; INVADER	2014-02-27	H-IIA-202	JPN	Tama Art College	39577	AE: 2014-02-27	2014-009F
78	LituanicaSAT-OSCAR 78; LO-78; LituanicaSAT-1	2014-01-09	Antares-120	LIT	Vilnius Uni	39569	AE: 2014-07-28	1998-067EN
79	European-OSCAR 79; (EO-79; QB50P1	2014-06-19	Dnepr	BEL	Von Karman Inst. for Fluid Mechanics	40025	Operational	2014-033R
80	European-OSCAR 80; EO-80; QB50P2	2014-06-19	Dnepr	BEL	Von Karman Inst. for Fluid Mechanics	40032	Operational	2014-033Y
81	Fuji-OSCAR 81; FO-81; ARTSAT2-DESPATCH	2014-12-03	H-IIA-202	JPN	Tama Art College	40321	Ceased operations	2014-076C
82	Fuji-OSCAR 82; FO-82; Shin’en-2	2014-12-03	H-IIA-202	JPN	Kagoshima Uni	40320	Operational	2014-076B
83	Naval Academy OSCAR 83; NO-83; BRICSat-P	2015-05-20	Atlas V 501	USA	U.S. Naval Academy	40655	Operational	2015-025E
84	Naval Academy OSCAR 84; NO-84; ParkinsonSAT A (PSAT)	2015-05-20	Atlas V 501	USA	U.S. Naval Academy	40654	AE: 2021-12-22	2015-025D
85	AMSAT-OSCAR 85; AO-85; Fox-1A	2015-10-08	Atlas V 401	USA	AMSAT-NA	40967	Ceased operations	2015-058D
86	Indonesia-OSCAR 86; IO-86; LAPAN-A2	2015-09-28	PSLV-XL	IDN	LAPAN	40931	Operational	2015-052B
87	LUSEX-OSCAR 87; LO-87; ÑuSat-1	2016-05-30	CZ-4B	ARG	AMSAT-LU	41557	AE: 2023-10-21	2016-033B
88	Emirates-OSCAR 88; EO-88; Nayif 1	2017-02-15	PSLV-XL	UAE	AMSAT	42017	AE: 2023-07-18	2017-008BX
89	Tsukuba-OSCAR 89; TO-89; ITF-2	2016-12-09	H-IIA-304	JPN	Tsukuba Uni	41932	AE: 2019-01-03	1998-067KU
90	LilacSat-OSCAR 90; LO-90; LilacSat-1	2017-04-18	Atlas V 401	CHN	Harbin Inst. Tech.; C-AMSAT	42725	AE: 2019-03-29	1998-067ME
91	AMSAT-OSCAR 91; AO-91; Fox-1B/RadFxSat	2017-11-18	Delta II	USA	Vanderbilt Uni; AMSAT-NA	43017	Partially Operational	2017-073E
92	AMSAT-OSCAR 92; AO-92; Fox-1D	2018-01-12	PSLV-XL	USA	AMSAT-NA	43137	AE: 2024-02-03	2018-004AC
93	Lunar-OSCAR 93; LO-93; DSLWP-A; Longjiang 1	2018-05-20	CZ-4C	CHN	Harbin Inst. Tech.; C-AMSAT	43471	Ceased operations	2018-045B
94	Lunar-OSCAR 94; LO-94; DSLWP-B; Longjiang 2	2018-05-20	CZ-4C	CHN	Harbin Inst. Tech.; C-AMSAT	43472	AE: 2019-07-31	2018-045C
95	AMSAT-OSCAR 95; AO-95; Fox-1Cliff	2018-12-03	Falcon 9	USA	AMSAT-NA	43774	Ceased operations	2018-099S
96	VUsat-OSCAR 96; VO-96; ExseedSat-1	2018-12-03	Falcon 9	IND	Exseed Space Innovations Ltd; AMSAT-NA	43775	Ceased operations	2018-099T
97	Jordan-OSCAR 97; JO-97; JY1Sat	2018-12-03	Falcon 9	JOR	Royal Jordanian Amateur Radio Society	43803	Operational	2018-099AX
98	Fuji-OSCAR 98; FO-98; OrigamiSat-1	2019-01-18	Epsilon	JPN	Tokyo Inst. Tech.	43933	AE: 2022-04-30	2019-003B
99	Fuji-OSCAR 99; FO-99; NEXUS	2019-01-18	Epsilon	JPN	Nihon Uni; AMSAT Japan	43937	AE: 2023-11-09	2019-003F
100	Qatar-OSCAR 100; QO-100; Es’hail-2	2018-11-15	Falcon 9	QAT	Es'hailSat Qatar Satellite Coy; Qatar Amateur Radio Society; AMSAT-DE	43700	Operational	2018-090A
101	Philippines-OSCAR 101; PO-101; Diwata-2	2018-10-29	H-2A	PLP	Ministerium für Wissenschaft und Technik der Philippinen (DOST)	43678	Operational	2018-084H
102	BIT Progress-OSCAR 102; BO-102; CAS-7B; BP-1B	2019-07-25	Hyperbola-1	CHN	C-AMSAT; Beijing Inst. Tech.	44443	AE: 2019-08-06	2019-043A
103	Navy-OSCAR 103; NO-103; BRICSat-2	2019-06-25	Falcon Heavy	USA	U.S. Naval Academy	44355	AE: 2022-04-20	2019-036S
104	Navy-OSCAR 104; NO-104; PSAT-2	2019-06-25	Falcon Heavy	USA	U.S. Naval Academy	44354	AE: 2023-02-15	2019-036R
105	Magyar-OSCAR 105; MO-105; SMOG-P	2019-12-06	Electron	HUN	Budapest Uni	44832	AE: 2020-09-28	2019-084J
106	Magyar-OSCAR 106; MO-106; ATL-1	2019-12-06	Electron	HUN	Budapest Uni	44830	AE: 2020-10-10	2019-084G
107	HuskySat-OSCAR 107; HO-107; HuskySat-1	2019-11-02	Cygnus NG-12	USA	Washington Uni	45119	AE: 2022-04-10	2019-071J
108	TQ-OSCAR 108; TO-108; Tianqin-1	2019-12-20	CZ-4	CHN	DFH Satellite Co.; Sun Yat-sen Uni; Huazhong Uni; C-AMSAT	44881	Operational	2019-093A
109	AMSAT-OSCAR 109; AO-109; RadFxSat-2; Fox-1E	2021-01-17	LauncherOne	USA	Vanderbilt Uni; AMSAT-NA	47311	AE: 2024-04-22	2021-002C
110	Magyar-OSCAR 110; MO-110; SMOG-1	2021-03-22	Sojus-2.1a / Fregat	HUN	Budapest Uni	47964	AE: 2024-07-28	2021-022AJ
111	DIY-OSCAR 111; DO-111; DIY-1; ArduiQube	2021-03-22	Sojus-2.1a / Fregat	ARG	DIYsatellite Gruppe	47963	AE: 2023-07-21	2021-022AH
112	MIRSAT-OSCAR 112; MO-112; MIR-Sat 1	2021-06-03	Falcon 9	MAU	Mauritius Research and Innovation Council	48868	AE: 2022-04-20	1998-067SP
113	HO-OSCAR 113; HO-113; CAMSAT XW-3	2021-12-26	CZ-4	CHN	C-AMSAT	50466	Operational	2021-131B
114	Spain-OSCAR 114; SO-114; EASAT-2	2022-01-13	Falcon 9	ESP	AMSAT-NA	51081	AE: 2024-05-23	2022-002DB
115	Spain-OSCAR 115; SO-115; Hades (Satellit)	2022-01-13	Falcon 9	ESP	AMSAT-NA	51080	AE: 2024-05-27	2022-002DA
116	Nepal-OSCAR 116; NO-116; SanoSat-1	2022-01-13	Falcon 9	NEP	AMSAT-Nepal	51031	AE: 2024-02-04	2022-002AZ
117	Italy-OSCAR 117; IO-117; GreenCube	2022-07-13	Vega-C	ITA	AMSAT-Italy	53106	Ceased operations	2022-080E
118	Fengtai-OSCAR 118; FO-118; Fengtai Shaonian 2; CAS-5A	2022-12-09	Jielong-3	CHN	C-AMSAT	54684	AE: 2025-03-06	2022-167C
119	Hope-OSCAR 119; HO-119; XiWang-4; CAS-10	2022-11-12	Long March 7	CHN	C-AMSAT	54816	AE: 2023-03-15	2021-035C
120	Spain-OSCAR 120; SO-120; URESAT-1; Hades-B	2023-06-12	Falcon 9	ESP	AMSAT-EA	56992	AE: 2025-02-21	2023-084BU
121	Spain-OSCAR 121; SO-121; Hades-D	2023-11-11	Falcon 9	ESP	AMSAT-EA	58567	AE: 2024-11-05	2023-174CY
122	MESAT1-OSCAR 122; MO-122; MESAT1	2024-07-04	Firefly Alpha	USA	AMSAT	60209	Ceased operations	2024-125G
123	ASRTU-OSCAR 123; AO-123; ASRTU-1	2024-11-04	Sojus-2.1b / Fregat	CNH; RUS	Harbin Inst. Tech.; Amur State Uni	61781	Operational	2024-199AY
124	SPAIN-OSCAR 124; SO-124; Hades-R	2025-01-14	Falcon 9	ESP	AMSAT-EA	62690	AE: 2026-02-03	2025-009CK
125	SPAIN-OSCAR 125; SO-125; Hades-ICM	2025-03-14	Falcon 9	ESP	AMSAT-EA	63492	AE: 2025-05-21	2025-052BN

== See also ==
- AMSAT
