= Call signs in the Middle East =

Unique identifiers for radio communication

Call signs in the Middle East are unique identifiers for telecommunications and broadcasting in the Middle East. Call signs are regulated internationally by the International Telecommunication Union (ITU) and nationally by local government and international agencies in Israel, Jordan, Lebanon, Syria, The Palestinian Authority, occupied territories and other nations or DXCC entities.

About 9,100 licensed operators in the Middle East have call signs. Since callsign allocation from the ITU is administered by national political authorities and international mandates, it is a story of transition, compromise, and internationally unrecognized operation to follow the history of such allocations in the 20th century in this area.

== Call sign blocks for telecommunication ==
The ITU has assigned countries in the Middle East the following call sign blocks for all radio communication, broadcasting or transmission:

Call sign block	DXCC Entity	Approx. # hams
A4A–A4Z	Oman	170
A6A–A6Z	United Arab Emirates	689
A7A–A7Z	Qatar	65
A9A–A9Z	Bahrain	23
EPA–EQZ, 9B–9D	Iran	32
E4A–E4Z	Palestinian Authority	28
HZA–HZZ, 7Z, 8Z	Saudi Arabia	560
JYA–JYZ	Jordan (Hashemite Kingdom of)	92
OD5AA–OD5ZZ	Lebanon	23
SUA–SUZ, 6A–6B, SSA–SSM	Egypt	113
TAA–TCZ, YMA–YMZ	Turkey	4,689
YIA–YIZ, HNA–HNZ	Iraq	219
YKA–YKZ, 6CA–6CZ	Syria	30
ZC4	Cyprus, UK Sovereign Base Area	52
4XA–4XZ, 4ZA–4ZZ	Israel	2,238
5B, C4, H2, P3, P30, P36	Cyprus, Republic of	643
7OA–7OZ	Yemen Republic	13
9KA–9KZ	Kuwait	240

The DXCC deleted entities list notes that for the British Protectorate prefix of ZC6 and the Palestine prefix of 4X1, only contacts made June 30, 1968, and before, count for Palestine as an entity. Contacts made July 1, 1968, and after, count as Israel (4X).

4W used to be a prefix for Yemen, but only contacts made May 21, 1990, and before, count for this entity. With the merger of North and South Yemen, only "7O" is used. However, amateur operation from this entity is extremely rare.

While not directly related to call signs, the ITU further has divided all countries assigned amateur radio prefixes into three regions; the Middle East is located in ITU Region 1. It is assigned ITU Zone 39 with Egypt being mainly in ITU Zone 38 and Iran in ITU Zone 40, and CQ Zones 20 & 21 with Egypt mainly in CQ Zone 34.

== History of call sign allocation ==
The callsign allocation history of this region is complex and follows the political interests of various countries who exercised political control in the region. It also changed in relation to various independence movements, particularly following World War II.

However, as early as 1931 the prefix "AP" (i.e., for Asia/Pacific) arose for the region. Today that is used for Pakistan.

Before 1945 the prefixes ZC1 and ZC6 were used for Transjordan and Palestine respectively, still seen as a British Protectorate.

=== International Radiotelegraph Conferences ===
The conference held in 1927 assigned call prefixes to Persia (RVA–RVZ), Egypt (SUA–SUZ), Turkey (TAA–TCZ), and Iraq (YIA–YIZ). These, however, did not necessarily include amateur radio operation. Middle East areas administered politically by mandated countries (i.e., Great Britain's mandate over Palestine) adopted call sign regulations of those entities.

The 1947 Atlantic City ITU Conference reallocated call sign blocks to Iraq (HNA–HNZ, YIA–YIZ), Egypt (SSA–SUZ), Turkey (TAA–TCZ, YMA–YMZ), and to British Colonies and Protectorates (ZBA–ZJZ, ZNA–ZOZ, ZQA–ZQZ, and 4PA–4SZ). The United Nations was assigned 4UA–4UZ which sometimes was used in the Middle East.

=== Cyprus, including UK Sovereign Base Areas and northern Cyprus ===
The island of Cyprus includes two DXCC entities as well as one other recognized only by the government of Turkey.

The Republic of Cyprus became independent from Great Britain in 1960. It has de jure governance over most of the island of Cyprus, except for the United Kingdom Sovereign Base Areas (SBA) of Akrotiri and Dhekelia in the south and east of the island. The Turkish Republic of Northern Cyprus is a self-proclaimed state on the part of the island occupied by Turkey. This situation came about after a Turkish invasion of the island in 1974 and a unilateral declaration of independence for the north in 1983. The international community, including the United Nations and the European Union, recognises the de jure sovereignty of the Republic of Cyprus over the entire island, less the SBAs.

The ITU has assigned "5B", "C4", "H2" and "P3" prefixes to the Republic of Cyprus. As the SBAs are not under the sovereignty of Cyprus, Great Britain assigns the pre-1960 colonial call sign prefix "ZC4" to roughly 50 amateur radio operators in the SBAs.

Northern Cyprus uses the prefix block of "1BA–1BZ", which has not been allocated by the ITU, for its radio operation. There is regular tension with the block's use, especially for visitors to the north who sign with a "1B/" prefix. Operators in the south tell them to use "5B/".

=== Syria ===
What is known today as Syria was part of the Ottoman Empire until World War I. In 1920 it became a League of Nations French Mandate, which included Lebanon. Syria became republic in 1946 with France's withdrawal.

Intermediate callsign prefixes of "AR" were available to amateurs in the region until after World War II. In 1949 the Syrian Amateur Radio League was formed and YK1 was adopted as the Syrian prefix. Syria has made use of the "6C" prefix for special events. United Nations peacekeepers in the border area with Israel have used their callsigns with a "/YK" added.

=== Palestine and Transjordan/Jordan ===
Callsigns until 1945 were split between ZC1 for Transjordan and ZC6 for Palestine, as part of Great Britain's scheme for overseas radio. All the stations belonged to members of the British Forces. Palestine counted as a separate DXCC country for contacts made until June 30, 1968, as the British still granted licences mainly to their own nationals. After the creation of the State of Israel, UN Headquarters retained the use of the ZC6 prefix with station ZC6UNJ at the Jerusalem headquarters.

Jordan changed to the JY prefix under the use of British personnel in the area. King Hussein in the 1950s was an amateur radio operator and popularized the use of the JY1 prefix for foreigners and citizens following the British exodus from the region.

Palestine was added to the DXCC List under paragraph b) effective 1 October 1999, with start date of 1 February 1999. The only prefix acceptable is E4 since the call-sign group ZC6 is registered for Great Britain and its overseas possessions. Under the DXCC rules, contacts with the deleted entity of Palestine made prior to June 30, 1968, do not count for this entity. There is no commonality of territory or administration. E4 is in WAZ Zone 20, ITU Zone 39.

=== Israel ===
The September before the creation of the State of Israel, the station ZC6AA identified its location as "Tel Aviv, Israel."

4X and 4Z were activated when the state of Israel was proclaimed, however afterwards some individual operators adopted call signs assuming that the territory was still "Arab Palestine". The UN Headquarters signed "Jerusalem" in 1947 and "Jerusalem, Palestine" in 1957, with callsigns ZC6UNJ and ZC6UNU.

During the Suez crisis in 1957, some Israeli operators signed in the Sinai with an Israelis prefix, but with a /SINAI appended to their call sign.

Israel can issue a National Israeli call sign in the series 4Z8 to foreign amateurs whose countries participate in the CEPT Recommendation T/R 61–02.

The Israeli Amateur Radio Club (IARC) was founded on February 18, 1948, and is a member at IARU. Presently call signs are issued within Israel by the Ministry of Communications according to this table:

Call sign block	License Category
4X0, 4Z0, 4X2, 4Z2, 4X3, 4Z3, 4Z6, 4X7, 4X9	Special Events
4X1AA–4X1ZZ, 4Z1AA–4Z1ZZ	Extra/Class A
4X4AA–4X4ZZ, 4Z4AA–4Z4ZZ, 4Z5AA–4Z5ZZ, 4X5AA-4X5ZZ, 4X6AA–4X6ZZ	General/Class B
4Z9AAA–4Z9ZZZ	Novice/Class C
4Z7AAA–4Z7ZZZ	Technician/Class D
4X8AA–4X8ZZ	Honorary
4Z8AA–4Z8ZZ	Foreign

In July 2012 a 4Z5 operator was upgraded to class A without a callsign change. Some 4X6 stations are also class A.

=== Gaza ===
Gaza became part of the British Mandate following World War I. After the 1948 Arab/Israeli war Gaza was administered by Egypt, but was captured by Israel in the 1967 war. In 1993 the area was transferred to the Palestinian National Authority. After Egypt's loss of Gaza to Israel in 1967, amateur radio operation by civilians was generally forbidden. UN stations sometimes added "/4U" to their national call signs and one added the British Protectorate prefix "/ZC6" to his.

On 2 December 1994 the Palestine Authority for Gaza and Jericho issued the call-signs to Palestine nationals, ZC6A to Ali Yashruti and ZC6B to Dr. Sama Tarazi (previously KF2GJ) who ran a short operation from the Gaza strip, using the historic call sign ZC6B. Designations used by foreigners have been /GAZA and /ZC6 following their own national call signs. This practice continued until as late as 2001.

In 1999 Palestine was allocated the E4 block of call signs and the Palestine Authority granted visitor licenses. Some Hungarian and Japanese nationals used /E4 following their call signs from that date.

In October 2012, an E40 call was issued to a Gaza ham who calls on the Jerusalem (Israel Amateur Radio Club) R1 repeater. Since that call was already issued by the Palestinian Authority to a Russian DX'er, as of early December 2012 he started using E44M. He was off the repeater during most of November 2012 due to the 2012 Israeli operation in the Gaza Strip.

=== Lebanon ===
Amateur radio in Lebanon is governed by the Ministry of Telecommunications including the Ministry of Defense – Intelligence Unit and Ministry of Transport – Civil aviation. Reciprocal and temporary licenses are offered in Lebanon by the Ministry of Telecommunications on a case-by-case basis, as Lebanon has no agreements with any other country.

The ITU assigns the call sign block ODA–ODZ to Lebanon. Until the mid-1950s amateurs there operated with an AR8 prefix.

=== Saudi Arabia ===
Saudi public amateur radio licensing commenced in 2004, as the Saudi Communications and Information Technology Commission took over regulation within the HZ, 7Z and 8Z ITU call sign area. Foreign hams before then could operate from club stations, like the Dhahran Amateur Radio Club (HZ1AB).

HZ1AB was originally the United States Military Training Mission and the station formally closed in 2004. The call sign is now issued to a Saudi national.

After deregulation, there are now about 500 licensed radio amateurs in Saudi Arabia. Class 1 licensees (HF, VHF & SHF) are using the prefixes HZ1 or 7Z1, HZ2, 7Z2 stations have licenses class 2 (VHF & SHF only).

Saudi Arabia has constructed OSCAR satellites for amateur use. Saudi-OSCAR 41 (SO-41, Saudisat 1A) and Saudi-OSCAR 42 (SO-42, Saudisat 1B) were both launched on September 26, 2000, and are now non-operational. Saudi-OSCAR 50 (SO-50, Saudisat-1C) was launched on December 20, 2002, and remains operational.

=== Yemen ===
The club station 7O1AA operated for six months in 1990. On May 22, 1990, Yemen Arab Republic (4W) and People's Democratic Republic of Yemen (7O) were deleted from the DXCC list as the two countries united into one becoming Yemen (7O). There have been various claims that no amateur station licenses have been issued since. North Korea and Yemen remain the only two national jurisdictions which do not issue amateur radio licenses to their citizens.

According to an editorial by Bernie McClenny, W3UR, in "The Daily DX", after the creation of the DXCC entity for unified Yemen, a team from Kuwait consisting of 9K2CS, 9K2DR and 9K2EC operated as 7O1AA in late May and early June 1990. Shortly after F2VX and F6EXV operated as 7O8AA during late July and early August 1990. And finally OH2YY was QRV as 7O/OH2YY in early May 2002. Each of these were accepted by ARRL for DXCC. There have been several operations from 7O that did not count for DXCC (7O1A – 1996, 7O1YGF – 2000)."

The ARRL DXCC desk does also recognize the Yemen operation by Pekka Ahlqvist, OH2YY, in May 2002 as it was conducted with written approval from the Yemeni government. A recent operation from Socotra Island using callsign 7O6T took place in May 2012. It was organized by a multinational team led by Dmitri Zhikharev RA9USU from Russia.

=== Deleted or changed DXCC entities in the Middle East ===
Call sign block	Deleted entity	Changed to
4W, 7O	Yemen	
8Z4	Saudi Arabia/Iraq neutral zone	
VS9A	Saudi Arabia/Iraq neutral zone	
8Z5	Saudi Arabia/Kuwait neutral zone	
ZC6	Palestine, pre-1948	
ZC1	Transjordan, pre-1948	
VS9O, MP4M	Oman	A4
MP4D, T	United Arab Emirates	A6
MP4Q	Qatar	A7
MP4B	Bahrain	A9
ZC4	Cyprus	5B

== See also ==
- Amateur radio international operation
- Call signs
- ITU prefix – amateur and experimental stations
- Amateur radio license
