= Fox-1Cliff =

American amateur radio satellite

- Mission type: Communications
- Operator: AMSAT
- COSPAR ID: 2018-099N
- SATCAT no.: 43770

Spacecraft properties
- Launch mass: 1.3 kg (2.9 lb)
- Dimensions: 10 cm × 10 cm × 10 cm (3.9 in × 3.9 in × 3.9 in)

Start of mission
- Launch date: 13:34, 3 December 2018 UTC
- Rocket: Falcon-9 v1.2 (Block 5)
- Launch site: Vandenberg SLC-4E
- Contractor: SpaceX

Orbital parameters
- Reference system: Geocentric
- Regime: Low Earth
- Semi-major axis: 6,960 kilometres (4,320 mi)
- Eccentricity: 0.0013176
- Perigee altitude: 580.6 kilometres (360.8 mi)
- Apogee altitude: 599 kilometres (372 mi)
- Inclination: 97.7217°
- Period: 96.3 minutes
- RAAN: 108.0793°
- Argument of perigee: 289.6601°
- Mean motion: 14.94902621
- Epoch: 3 February 2020

Fox-1Cliff, AO-95 or AMSAT OSCAR 95 is an American amateur radio satellite. Fox-1Cliff is a 1U CubeSat built by AMSAT-NA that carries a single-channel transponder for mode U/V in FM.

The satellite carries several student experiments:

- Vanderbilt University Low Energy Proton (LEP) radiation experiment (flight spare from Fox-1A)
- Penn State University Erie gyroscope experiment

It also carries a VGA camera provided by Virginia Tech.

== Mission ==
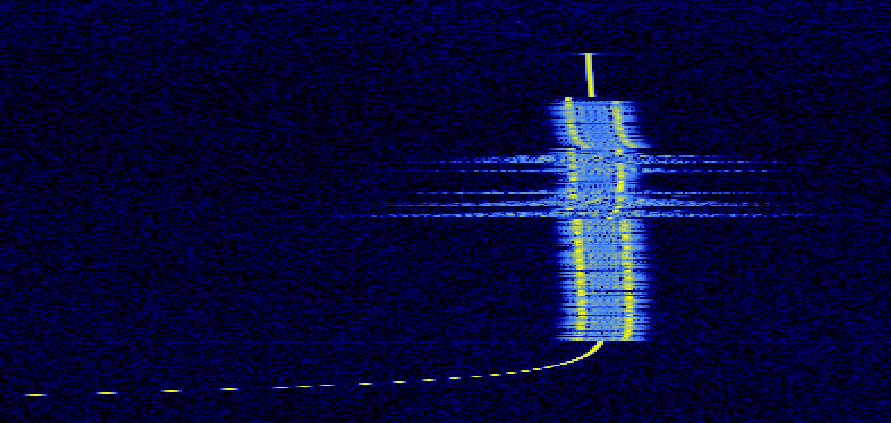
Waterfall capture of Fox-1Cliff safe mode beacon, commonly called the "Veronica" beacons.

Beacon transmitted by Fox-1Cliff (AO-95) every 2 minutes.

Fox-1Cliff was launched on 3 December, 2018 via Falcon 9 Block 5 from Vandenberg Air Force Base, California, United States.

=== Receiver failure ===
Shortly after deployment, AO-95's receiver suffered a failure for unknown reasons.

== Name ==
The satellite is the third of five Fox-1 satellites, and was originally named Fox-1C. In 2016, it was renamed Fox-1Cliff in honor of Cliff Buttschardt, a long time member of AMSAT and a contributor to the project, who died earlier that year. After its launch, Fox-1Cliff was renamed AO-95.

== See also ==
- Fox-1A
- Fox-1B
- Fox-1D
