= Amateur radio satellite =

Type of satellite that transmits over amateur radio frequencies

An amateur radio satellite is an artificial satellite built and used by amateur radio operators. It forms part of the Amateur-satellite service. These satellites use amateur radio frequency allocations to facilitate communication between amateur radio stations.

Many amateur satellites receive an OSCAR designation, which is an acronym for Orbiting Satellite Carrying Amateur Radio. The designation is assigned by AMSAT, an organization which promotes the development and launch of amateur radio satellites. Because of the prevalence of this designation, amateur radio satellites are often referred to as OSCARs.

These satellites can be used free of charge by licensed amateur radio operators for voice (FM, SSB) and data (AX.25, packet radio, APRS) communications. Currently, over 18 fully operational amateur radio satellites are in orbit. They may be designed to act as repeaters, as linear transponders, and as store and forward digital relays.

Amateur radio satellites have helped advance the science of satellite communications. Contributions include the launch of the first satellite voice transponder (OSCAR 3) and the development of highly advanced digital "store-and-forward" messaging transponder techniques.

The Amateur Radio Satellite community is very active in building satellites and in finding launch opportunities. Lists of functioning satellites need updating regularly, as new satellites are launched and older ones fail. Current information is published by AMSAT. AMSAT has not been actively involved in the launch and operation of most amateur satellites in the last two decades beyond allocating an OSCAR number.

== History ==
=== OSCAR 1 ===
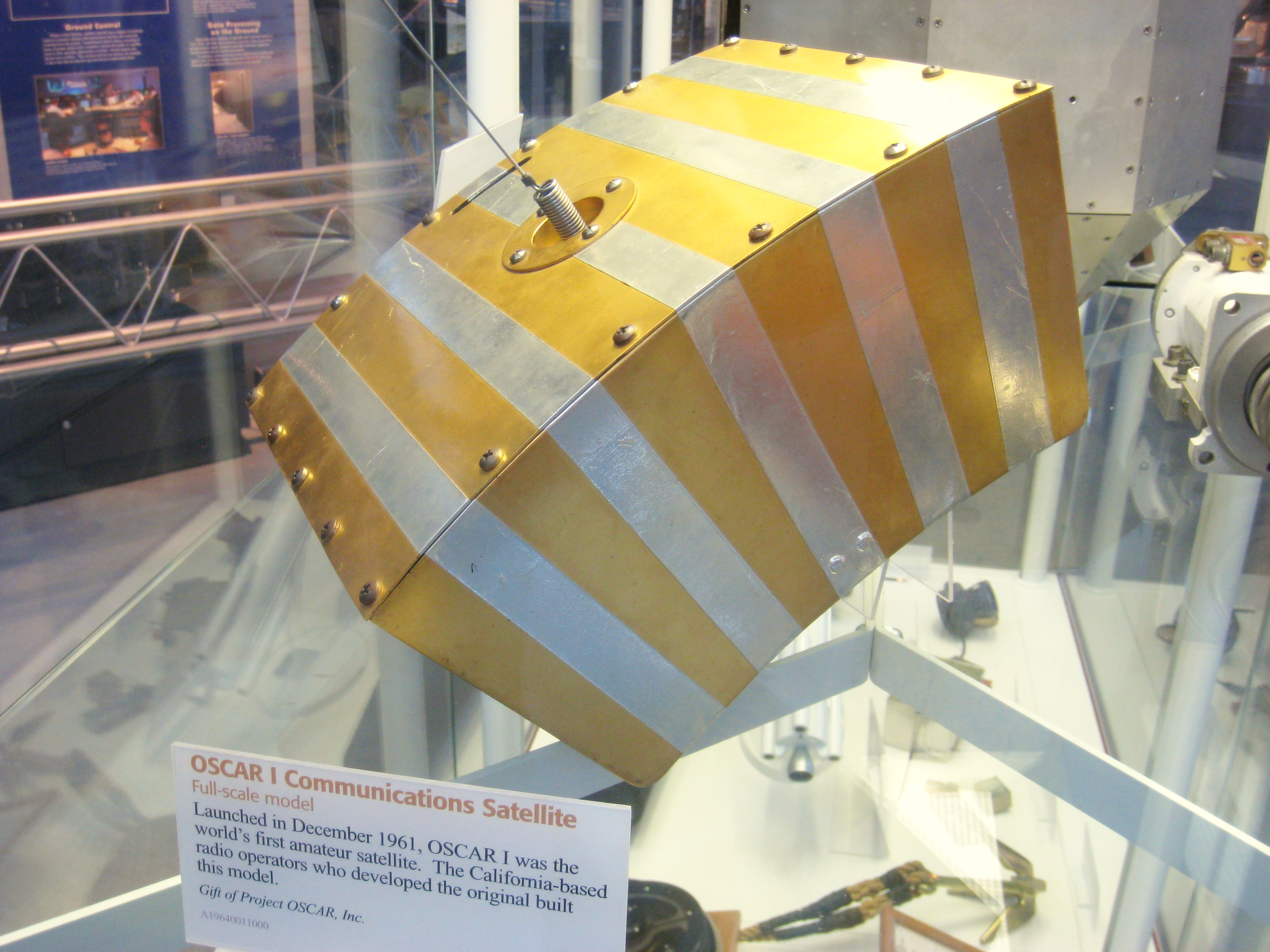
First amateur radio satellite OSCAR 1, launched in 1961

Simple OSCAR beacon signal, 1962

The first amateur satellite, simply named OSCAR 1, was launched on December 12, 1961, barely four years after the launch of the world's first satellite, Sputnik I. The satellite had to be built in a very specific shape and weight, so it could be used in place of one of the launch vehicle ballast weights. OSCAR 1 was the first satellite to be ejected as a secondary payload (the primary payload was Discoverer 36) and to subsequently enter a separate orbit. It carried no on-board propulsion and its orbit decayed quickly. Despite orbiting for only 22 days, OSCAR 1 was an immediate success and led to follow-on missions. Over 570 amateur radio operators in 28 countries forwarded observations to Project OSCAR.

=== OSCAR 10 ===
Most of the components for OSCAR 10 were "off the shelf". Jan King led the project. Solar cells were bought in batches of 10 or 20 from Radio Shack, and tested for efficiency by group members. The most efficient cells were kept for the project; the rest were returned to RadioShack. Once ready, OSCAR 10 was mounted aboard a private plane, and flown a couple of times to evaluate its performance and reliability. Special QSL cards were issued to those who participated in the airplane-based tests. Once it was found to be operative and reliable, the satellite was shipped to Kennedy Space Center, where it was mounted in the launch vehicle's third stage^{Which one}. OSCAR 10's dimensions were: Height: 1.35 m (53 in) Width: 2.0 m (78.75 in) Weight: 140 kg at launch; 90 kg post engine firings.

=== Other satellites ===
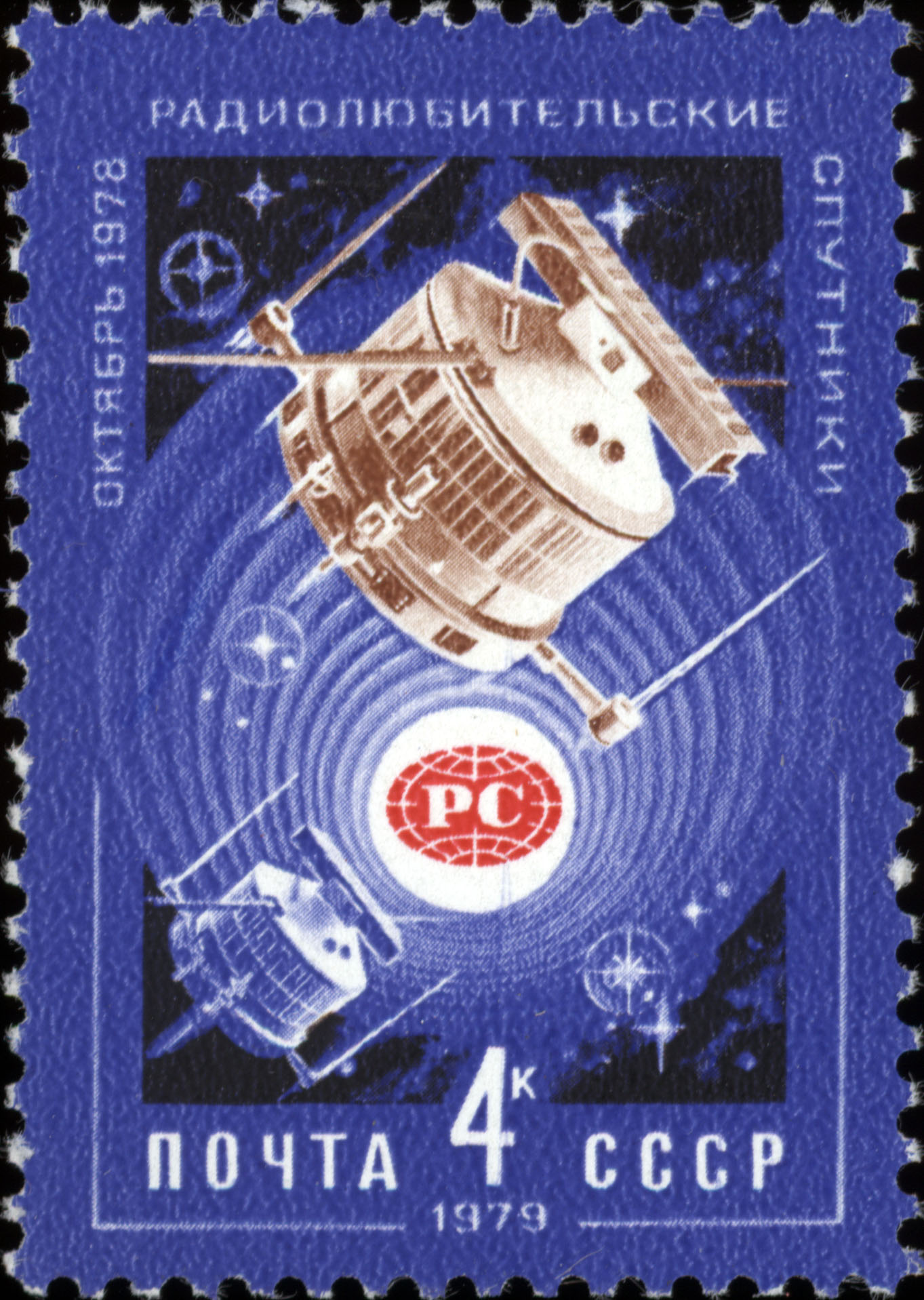
USSR postal stamp depicting amateur radio satellitе RS-2

Other programs besides OSCAR have included Iskra (Soviet Union) circa 1982, JAS-1 (Fuji-OSCAR 12) (Japan) in 1986, RS (Soviet Union and Russia), and CubeSats. (There is a list of major amateur satellites in Japanese Wikipedia).

Es’hail 2 / QO-100 Launched November 15, 2018.In geostationary orbit covering Brazil to Thailand.

Narrowband Linear transponder

2400.050 - 2400.300 MHz Uplink

10489.550 - 10489.800 MHz Downlink

Wideband digital transponder

2401.500 - 2409.500 MHz Uplink

10491.000 - 10499.000 MHz Downlink

== Hardware ==
The first amateur satellites contained telemetry beacons. Since 1965, most OSCARs carry a linear transponder for two-way communications in real time. Some satellites have a bulletin board for store-and-forward digital communications, or a digipeater for direct packet radio connections.

== Orbits ==
Amateur satellites have been launched into low Earth orbits and into highly elliptical orbits.

== Operations ==
=== Satellite communications ===
Currently, amateur satellites support many different types of operation, including FM voice and SSB voice, as well as digital communications of AX.25 FSK (Packet radio) and PSK-31.

==== Mode designators ====
Uplink and downlink designations use sets of paired letters following the structure X/Y where X is the uplink band and Y is the downlink band. Occasionally, the downlink letter is rendered in lower case (i.e., X/y). With a few exceptions, the letters correspond to IEEE's standard for radar frequency letter bands:

Designator	H	A	V	U	L	S	S2	C	X	K	R
Band	15 m	10 m	2 m	70 cm	23 cm	13 cm	9 cm	5 cm	3 cm	1.2 cm	6 mm
Frequency (General)	21 MHz	29 MHz	145 MHz	435 MHz	1.2 GHz	2.4 GHz	3.4 GHz	5 GHz	10 GHz	24 GHz	47 GHz

Prior to the launch of OSCAR 40, operating modes were designated using single letters to indicate both uplink and downlink bands. While deprecated, these older mode designations are still widely used in casual conversation.

- Mode A: 2 m uplink / 10 m downlink
- Mode B: 70 cm uplink / 2 m downlink
- Mode J: 2 m uplink / 70 cm downlink

==== Doppler shift ====
Due to the high orbital speed of the amateur satellites, the uplink and downlink frequencies will vary during the course of a satellite pass. This phenomenon is known as the Doppler effect. While the satellite is moving towards the ground station, the downlink frequency will appear to be higher than normal. Hence, the receiver frequency at the ground station must be adjusted higher to continue receiving the satellite. The satellite in turn, will be receiving the uplink signal at a higher frequency than normal so the ground station's transmitted uplink frequency must be lower to be received by the satellite. After the satellite passes overhead and begins to move away, this process is reversed. The downlink frequency will appear lower and the uplink frequency will need to be adjusted higher. The following mathematical formulas relate the Doppler shift to the velocity of the satellite.

Where:
$f_d$	=	doppler corrected downlink frequency
$f_u$	=	doppler corrected uplink frequency
$f$	=	original frequency
$v$	=	velocity of the satellite relative to ground station in m/s. Positive when moving towards, negative when moving away.
$c$	=	the speed of light in a vacuum ($3\times10^8$ m/s).

Change in frequency	Downlink Correction	Uplink Correction
$\Delta f=f\times\frac{v}{c}$	$f_d=f(1+\frac{v}{c})$	$f_u=f(1-\frac{v}{c})$

Due to the complexity of finding the relative velocity of the satellite and the speed with which these corrections must be made, these calculations are normally accomplished using satellite tracking software. Many modern transceivers include a computer interface that allows for automatic doppler effect correction. Manual frequency-shift correction is possible, but it is difficult to remain precisely near the frequency. Frequency modulation is more tolerant of doppler shifts than single-sideband, and therefore FM is much easier to tune manually.

=== FM satellites ===
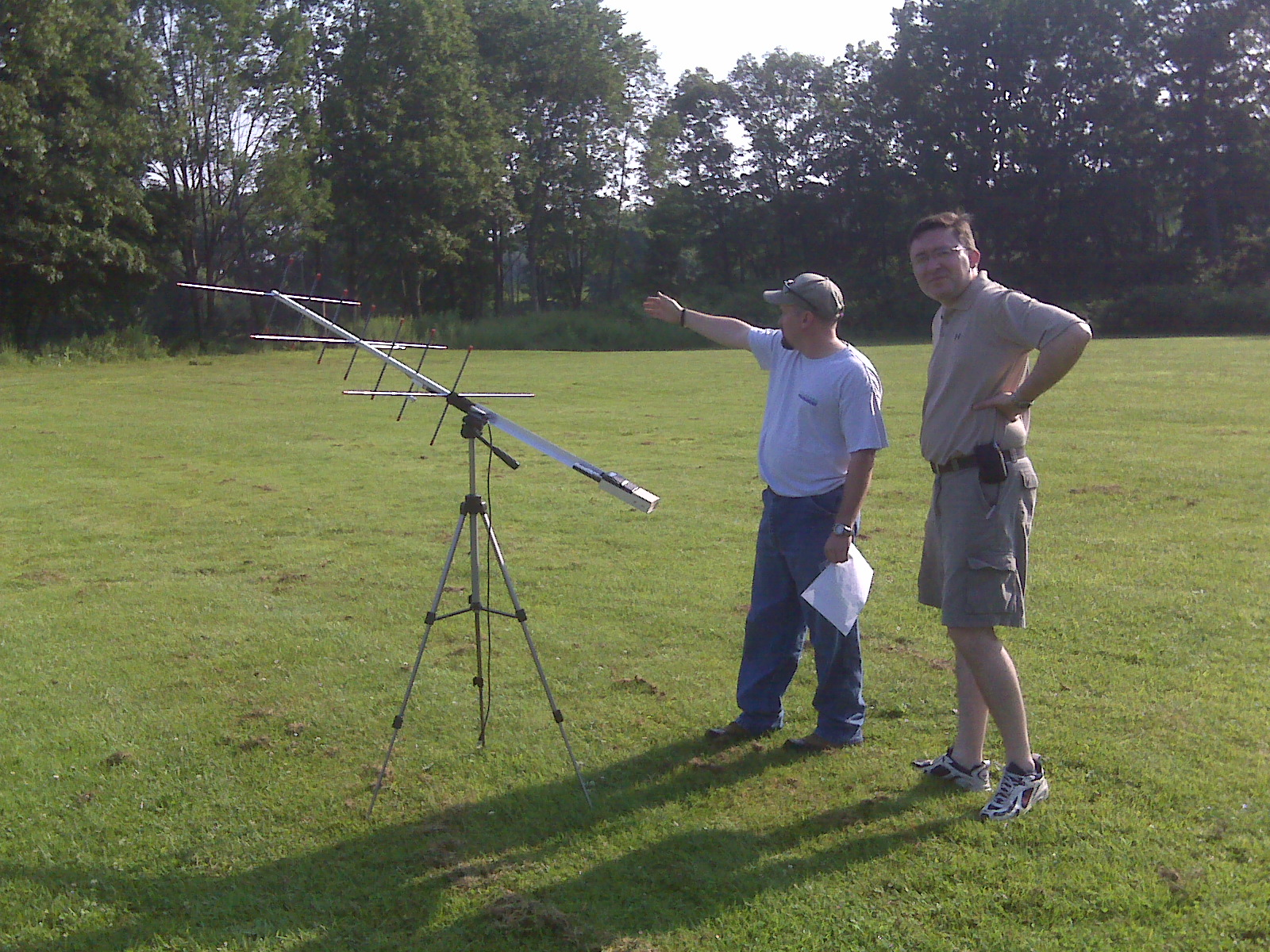
Yagi antenna being used to communicate through an FM satellite.

A number of low Earth orbit (LEO) OSCAR satellites use frequency modulation (FM). These are also commonly referred to as "FM LEOs" or the "FM Birds". Such satellites act as FM amateur radio repeaters that can be communicated through using commonly available amateur radio equipment. Communication can be achieved with handheld transceivers using manual doppler correction. Satellite passes are typically less than 15 minutes long.

== Launches ==
=== Past launches ===
The names of the satellites below are sorted in chronological order by launch date, ascending. The status column denotes the current operational status of the satellite. Green signifies that the satellite is currently operational, orange indicates that the satellite is partially operational or failing. Red indicates that the satellite is non operational and black indicates that the satellite has re-entered the Earth's atmosphere (or never successfully left it). The country listing denotes the country that constructed the satellite and not the launching country.

Launches (past and current)
Name	Status	Launched	Country
OSCAR (OSCAR 1)	Decayed	1961-12-12	United States
OSCAR II (OSCAR 2)	Decayed	1962-06-02	United States
OSCAR III (OSCAR 3, EGRS-3)	Non-Operational	1965-03-09	United States
OSCAR IV (OSCAR 4)	Decayed	1965-12-21	United States
Australis-OSCAR 5 (OSCAR 5, AO-5, AO-A)	Non-Operational	1970-01-23	Australia
AMSAT-OSCAR 6 (OSCAR 6, AO-6, AO-C, P2A)	Non-Operational	1972-10-15	United States
AMSAT-OSCAR 7 (OSCAR 7, AO-7, AO-B, P2B)	Semi-Operational	1974-11-15	United States
AMSAT-OSCAR 8 (OSCAR 8, AO-8, AO-D, P2D)	Non-Operational	1978-03-05	United States
Radio Sputnik 1 (RadioSkaf-1, RS-1)	Non-Operational	1978-10-26	Soviet Union
Radio Sputnik 2 (RadioSkaf-2, RS-2)	Non-Operational	1978-10-26	Soviet Union
UoSat-OSCAR 9 (UOSAT 1, UO-9)	Decayed	1981-10-06	United Kingdom
Radio Sputniks RS3 through RS8	Non-Operational	1981-12-17	Soviet Union
AMSAT-OSCAR 10 (Phase 3B, AO-10, P3B)	Non-Operational	1983-06-16	United States; West Germany
UoSat-OSCAR 11 (UoSat-2, UO-11, UoSAT-B)	Semi-Operational	1984-03-01	United Kingdom
Fuji-OSCAR 12 (JAS 1, FO-12)	Non-Operational	1986-08-12	Japan
Radio Sputnik 10/11 (RadioSkaf-10/11, RS-10/11, COSMOS 1861)	Non-Operational	1987-06-23	Soviet Union
AMSAT-OSCAR 13 (Phase 3C, AO-13, P3C)	Decayed	1988-06-15	West Germany
UOSAT-OSCAR 14 (UoSAT-3, UO-14 UoSAT-D)	Non-Operational	1990-01-22	United Kingdom
UOSAT-OSCAR 15 (UoSAT-4, UO-15, UoSAT-E)	Non-Operational	1990-01-22	United Kingdom
AMSAT-OSCAR 16 (Pacsat, AO-16, Microsat-1)	Semi-Operational	1990-01-22	United States
Dove-OSCAR 17 (Dove, DO-17, Microsat-2)	Non-Operational	1990-01-22	Brazil
Weber-OSCAR 18 (WeberSAT, WO-18, Microsat-3)	Non-Operational	1990-01-22	United States
LUSAT-OSCAR 19 (LUSAT, LO-19, Microsat-4)	Non-Operational	1990-01-22	Argentina
Fuji-OSCAR 20 (JAS 1B, FO-20, Fuji-1B)	Non-Operational	1990-02-07	Japan
AMSAT-OSCAR 21 (RS-14, AO-21, Informator-1)	Non-Operational	1991-01-29	Soviet Union
Radio Sputnik 12/13 (RadioSkaf-12/13, RS-12/13, COSMOS 2123)	Non-Operational	1991-02-05	Soviet Union
UoSat-OSCAR 22 (UOSAT 5, UO-22 UoSAT-F)	Non-Operational	1991-07-17	United Kingdom
KitSAT-OSCAR 23 (KITSAT 1, KO-23, Uribyol-1)	Non-Operational	1992-08-10	South Korea
Arsene-OSCAR 24 (Arsene, AO-24)	Non-Operational	1993-05-12	France
KitSAT-OSCAR 25 (KITSAT B, KO-25, Kitsat-2, Uribyol-2)	Non-Operational	1993-09-26	South Korea
Italy-OSCAR 26 (ITAMSAT, IO-26)	Non-Operational	1993-09-26	Italy
AMRAD-OSCAR 27 (EYESAT-1, AO-27)	Non-Operational	1993-09-26	United States
POSAT-OSCAR 28 (POSAT, PO-28, Posat-1)	Non-Operational	1993-09-26	Portugal
Radio Sputnik 15 (RadioSkaf-15, RS-15, Radio-ROSTO)	Semi-Operational	1994-12-26	Russia
Fuji-OSCAR 29 (JAS 2, FO-29, Fuji-2)	Semi-Operational	1996-08-17	Japan
Mexico-OSCAR 30 (UNAMSAT-2, MO-30, Unamsat-B, Kosmos-2334)	Non-Operational	1996-09-05	Mexico; Russia
Sputnik 40	Decayed	1997-11-03	France/Russia
Thai-Microsatellite-OSCAR 31 (TMSAT-1, TO-31)	Non-Operational	1998-07-10	Thailand
Gurwin-OSCAR 32 (GO-32, Gurwin-1b, Techsat-1b)	Non-Operational	1998-07-10	Israel
SEDSat-OSCAR 33 (SEDSat, SO-33, SEDsat-1)	Semi-Operational	1998-10-24	United States
Pansat-OSCAR 34 (PAN SAT, PO-34)	Non-Operational	1998-10-29	United States
Sputnik 41	Decayed	1997-11-03	France/Russia
Sunsat-OSCAR 35 (SUNSAT, SO-35)	Non-Operational	1999-02-23	South Africa
UoSat-OSCAR 36 (UOSAT 12, UO-36)	Non-Operational	1999-04-21	United Kingdom
ASU-OSCAR 37 (AO-37, ASUsat-1, ASUSAT)	Non-Operational	2000-01-27	United States
OPAL-OSCAR 38 (OO-38, StenSat, OPAL)	Non-Operational	2000-01-27	United States
Weber-OSCAR 39 (WO-39, JAWSAT)	Non-Operational	2000-01-27	United States
Saudi-OSCAR 41 (SO-41, Saudisat 1A)	Non-Operational	2000-09-26	Saudi Arabia
Saudi-OSCAR 42 (SO-42, Saudisat 1B)	Non-Operational	2000-09-26	Saudi Arabia
Malaysian-OSCAR 46 (MO-46, TIUNGSAT-1)	Non-Operational	2000-09-26	Malaysia
AMSAT-OSCAR 40 (AO-40, Phase 3D, P3D)	Non-Operational	2000-11-16	United States
Starshine-OSCAR 43 (SO-43, Starshine 3)	Decayed	2001-09-30	United States
Navy-OSCAR 44 (NO-44, PCSat)	Semi-Operational	2001-09-30	United States
Navy-OSCAR 45 (NO-45, Sapphire)	Non-Operational	2001-09-30	United States
BreizhSAT-OSCAR 47 (BO-47, IDEFIX CU1)	Non-Operational	2002-05-04	France
BreizhSAT-OSCAR 48 (BO-48, IDEFIX CU2)	Non-Operational	2002-05-04	France
AATiS-OSCAR 49 (AO-49, Safir-M, RUBIN 2)	Non-Operational	2002-12-20	Germany
Saudi-OSCAR 50 (SO-50, Saudisat-1C)	Operational	2002-12-20	Saudi Arabia
CubeSat-OSCAR 55 (Cute-1)	Operational	2003-06-30	Japan
CubeSat-OSCAR 57 (CubeSat-XI-IV)	Operational	2003-06-30	Japan
CanX-1	Non-Operational	2003-06-30	Canada
DTUSat	Decayed	2003-06-30	Denmark
AAU Cubesat	Non-Operational	2003-06-30	Denmark
RS-22 (Mozhayets 4)	Operational	2003-09-27	Russia
AMSAT-OSCAR 51 (Echo, AO-51)	Non-Operational	2004-06-28	United States
VUSat-OSCAR 52 (HAMSAT, VO-52, VUSat)	Non-Operational	2005-05-05	India; Netherlands
PCSat2 (PCSAT2)	Decayed	2005-08-03	United States
AMSAT-OSCAR 54 (AO-54, SuitSat, Radioskaf)	Decayed	2005-09-08	International
eXpress-OSCAR 53 (XO-53, SSETI Express)	Non-Operational	2005-10-27	European Space Agency
CubeSat-OSCAR 58 (CO-58, Cubesat XI-V)	Non-Operational	2005-10-27	Japan
UWE-1	Non-Operational	2005-10-27	Germany
NCube-2	Deployment failure	2005-10-27	Norway
CubeSat-OSCAR 56 (CO-56, Cute-1.7)	Non-Operational	2006-02-21	Japan
K7RR-Sat	Launch Failure	2006-07-26	United States
CP2	Launch Failure	2006-07-26	United States
HAUSAT 1	Launch Failure	2006-07-26	South Korea
ICE Cube 1	Launch Failure	2006-07-26	United States
ICE Cube 2	Launch Failure	2006-07-26	United States
ION	Launch Failure	2006-07-26	United States
KUTESat	Launch Failure	2006-07-26	United States
MEROPE	Launch Failure	2006-07-26	United States
nCUBE 1	Launch Failure	2006-07-26	Norway
RINCON	Launch Failure	2006-07-26	United States
SACRED	Launch Failure	2006-07-26	United States
SEEDS	Launch Failure	2006-07-26	Japan
Voyager (Mea Huaka'i)	Launch Failure	2006-07-26	United States
PicPot	Launch Failure	2006-07-26	Italy
HITSat-OSCAR 59 (HITSat, HO-59)	Decayed	2006-09-22	Japan
GeneSat-1	Decayed	2006-12-16	United States
Navy-OSCAR 60 (RAFT, NO-60)	Decayed	2006-12-21	United States
Navy-OSCAR 61 (ANDE, NO-61)	Decayed	2006-12-21	United States
Navy-OSCAR 62 (FCAL, NO-62)	Decayed	2006-12-21	United States
FalconSAT-3	Decayed	2007-03-09	United States
Libertad-1	Non-Operational	2007-04-17	Colombia
CAPE-1	Non-Operational	2007-04-17	United States
CP3	Non-Operational	2007-04-17	United States
CP4	Non-Operational	2007-04-17	United States
Pehuensat-OSCAR 63 (PEHUENSAT-1, PO-63)	Decayed	2007-10-01	Argentina
Delfi-OSCAR 64 (Delfi-C3, DO-64)	Decayed	2008-04-28	Netherlands
Cubesat-OSCAR 65 (Cute-1.7+APD II, CO-65)	Operational?	2008-04-28	Japan
Cubesat-OSCAR 66 (SEED II, CO-66)	Operational	2008-04-28	Japan
COMPASS-1	Semi-Operational	2008-04-28	Germany
RS-30 (Yubileiny, RS-30)	Operational	2008-05-23	Russia
PRISM (HITOMI)	Decayed	2009-01-23	Japan
KKS-1 (KISEKI)	Operational	2009-01-23	Japan
STARS (KUKAI)	Unknown	2009-01-23	Japan
Aggiesat2	Decayed	2009-07-30	United States
PARADIGM (BEVO-1)	Decayed	2009-07-30	United States
Sumbandila-OSCAR 67 (SumbandilaSat, SO-67)	Decayed	2009-09-17	South Africa
SwissCube	Operational	2009-09-23	Switzerland
ITUpSAT1	Operational	2009-09-23	Turkey
UWE-2	Non Operational	2009-09-23	Germany
BEESAT	Operational	2009-09-23	Germany
Hope Oscar 68 (XW-1, HO-68)	Beacon-Operational	2009-12-15	China
AubieSat-1 (AO-71)	Non-Operational	2011-10-28	United States
Masat-1 (MO-72)	Decayed	2012-02-13	Hungary
ESTCube-1	Non-Operational	2013-05-07	Estonia
CAPE 2 (LO-75)	Decayed	2013-11-20	United States
FUNcube-1 (AO-73)	Operational	2013-11-21	United Kingdom; Netherlands
CubeBug-2 (LUSAT-OSCAR 74)	Operational	2013-11-21	Argentina
$50SAT	Non-Operational	2013-11-21	United States
DELFI-N3XT	Non-Operational?	2013-11-21	Netherlands
ARTSAT INVADER (CO-77)	Decayed	2014-02-27	Japan
Lituanica SAT-1 (LO-78)	Decayed	2014-02-27	Lithuania
FunCube-2 (UKube-1)	Non-Operational	2014-07-08	United Kingdom
QB50P1 (EO-79, FUNcube-3)	Non-Operational	2014-07-19	Belgium
QB50P2	Semi-Operational	2014-07-19	Belgium
ARTSAT2-DESPATCH	Non-Operational	2014-12-03	Japan
Shin’en-2 (FO-82)	Non-Operational	2014-12-03	Japan
BRICSat-P (OSCAR 83)	Decayed	2015-05-20	United States
ParkinsonSAT (OSCAR 84, NO-84, PSAT)	Decayed	2015-05-20	United States
LilacSat-2 (CAS-3H)	Operational	2015-09-19	China
XW-2 (CAS-3)	Non-Operational	2015-09-19	China
Lapan-A2 (IO-86)	Operational	2015-09-28	Indonesia
Fox-1A (OSCAR 85, AO-85)	Non-Operational	2015-10-08	United States
HORYU-IV	Non-Operational	2016-02-17	Japan
CHUBUSAT-3	Non-Operational	2016-02-17	Japan
ÑuSat-1 (LUSEX OSCAR 87, LO-87)	Decayed	2016-05-30	Argentina
Nayif-1 (EO-88)	Decayed	2017-02-15	United Arab Emirates
ITF 2	Decayed	2016-12-09	Japan
LilacSat-1 (QB50, LO-90)	Decayed	2017-04-18	China
ZHUHAI-1 01/02 (CAS 4A/B)	Non-Operational	2017-06-15	China
Fox-1B (OSCAR 91, AO-91, RadFxSat)	Semi-Operational	2017-11-18	United States
Fox-1D (OSCAR 92, AO-92)	Decayed	2018-01-12	United States
K2SAT	Non-Operational	2018-03-12	South Korea
DSLWP-A (OSCAR 93, LO-93)	Non-Operational	2018-05-20	China
DSLWP-B (OSCAR 94, LO-94)	Operational	2018-05-20	China
Diwata-2 (Philippines-OSCAR 101, PO-101)	Operational	2018-10-29	Philippines
Es'hail 2 (Qatar-OSCAR 100, QO-100, P4A)	Operational	2018-11-15	Qatar
Fox-1Cliff (OSCAR 95, AO-95)	Semi-Operational	2018-12-03	United States
ExseedSat-1 (VUsat-OSCAR 96, VO-96)	Operational	2018-12-03	India
JY1Sat (Jordan-OSCAR 97, JO-97)	Operational	2018-12-03	Jordan
D-Star ONE Sparrow	Operational	2018-12-27	Germany
D-Star ONE iSat	Operational	2018-12-27	Germany
OrigamiSat (Fuji-OSCAR 98, FO-98)	Decayed	2019-01-18	Japan
NEXUS (Fuji-OSCAR 99, FO-99)	Decayed	2019-01-18	Japan
AISAT-1 (ExseedSat-2)	Decayed	2019-04-01	India
AztechSat 1	Non-Operational	2019-05-12	Mexico
CAS-7B (BIT Progress-OSCAR 102, BO-102)	Decayed	2019-07-25	China
BricSat-2 (Navy-OSCAR 103, NO-103)	Decayed	2019-06-25	United States
PSAT-2 (Navy-OSCAR 104, NO-104)	Decayed	2019-06-25	United States
HuskySat-1 (HO-107)	Decayed	2019-11-02	United States
SMOG-P (Magyar-OSCAR 105, MO-105)	Decayed	2019-12-06	Hungary
ATL-1 (Magyar-OSCAR 106, MO-106)	Decayed	2019-12-06	Hungary
Taurus-1 (Jinniuzuo-1)	Decayed	2019-12-09	China
Tianqin-1 (CAS-6, TO-108)	Operational	2019-12-20	China
DOSAAF-85 (RS-44)	Operational	2019-12-26	Russia
BY70-2	Decayed	2020-07-03	China
International Space Station (ISS)	Operational	2020-09-02	United States
RadFxSat-2 (AmSat Fox-1, AO-109)	Decayed	2024-01-17	United States
UVSQ-Sat	Rarely	2021-01-24	France
SDSAT (Satish Dhawan Sat)	Decayed	2021-02-28	India
SMOG-1 (Magyar-OSCAR 110, MO-110)	Decayed	2021-03-22	Hungary
DIY-1 (DIY-OSCAR 111, DO-111)	Decayed	2021-03-22	Argentina
GRBAlpha	Operational	2021-03-22	Slovakia
MIR-Sat 1 (MIRSAT-OSCAR 112, MO-112)	Decayed	2021-06-03	Mauritius
LEDSAT	Decayed	2021-08-17	Italy
CAMSAT XW-3 (HO-OSCAR 113, HO-113, CAS-9)	Operational	2021-12-26	China
BDSAT-2	Operational	2022-01-03	Czech Republic
EASAT-2 (Spain-OSCAR 114, SO-114)	Operational	2022-01-13	Spain
HADES (Spain-OSCAR 115, SO-115)	Operational	2022-01-13	Spain
SanoSat-1 (Nepal-OSCAR 116, NO-116)	Decayed	2022-01-13	Nepal
Tevel 1-8	Decayed	2022-01-13	Israel
Planetum-1	Operational	2022-05-25	Czech Republic
ForeSail 1	Failure	2022-05-25	Finland
GreenCube (Italy-OSCAR 117, IO-117)	Non-Operational	2022-07-13	Italy
Fengtai Shaonian 2 (CAS-5A, Fengtai-OSCAR 118, FO-118)	Operational	2022-12-09	China
XiWang-4 (Hope-OSCAR 119, HO-119, XW-4, CAS-10)	Operational	2022-11-12	China
EOS–07 (APRSDP-BTN)	Operational	2023-02-10	Bhutan
INSPIRE-Sat 7	Decayed	2023-04-15	France
RoseyCubesat-1	Operational	2023-04-15	Switzerland Monaco
IRIS-C	Operational	2023-04-15	Taiwan
MAYA-6	Decayed	2023-07-19	Philippines
Veronika	Operational	2023-11-11	Slovakia
HADES-D (SO-121)	Operational	2023-11-11	Spain
SONATE-2	Operational	2024-03-04	Germany
Kashiwa (柏)	Decayed	2024-03-23	Japan
MESAT 1 (MO-122)	Operational	2024-07-04	United States
KUBE/QUBE	Operational	2024-08-16	Germany
SAKURA	Future	2024-08-29	Japan

=== In development ===
- KiwiSAT - A microsatellite built by AMSAT-ZL. Flight-ready, but no launch provider found yet.

== Facts ==
=== Multinational effort ===
Currently, 30 countries have constructed a launched OSCAR satellite. These countries, in chronological order by date of launch, include:

1. United States
2. Australia
3. Spain
4. United Kingdom
5. Japan
6. Brazil
7. Argentina
8. Pakistan
9. Russia
10. France
11. Portugal
12. South Korea
13. Italy
14. Mexico
15. Israel
16. Thailand
17. South Africa
18. Malaysia
19. Saudi Arabia
20. Germany
21. India
22. Colombia
23. Netherlands
24. Indonesia
25. United Arab Emirates
26. China
27. Qatar
28. Jordan
29. Philippines
30. Hungary

=== Related names ===
SuitSat, an obsolete Russian space suit with a transmitter aboard, was officially known as "AMSAT-OSCAR 54". Coincidentally, "Oscar" was the name given to an obsolete space suit by its young owner in the 1958 novel Have Space Suit—Will Travel, by Robert A. Heinlein. This book was first published a year after the launch of Sputnik 1, the world's first artificial satellite.

== International regulation ==
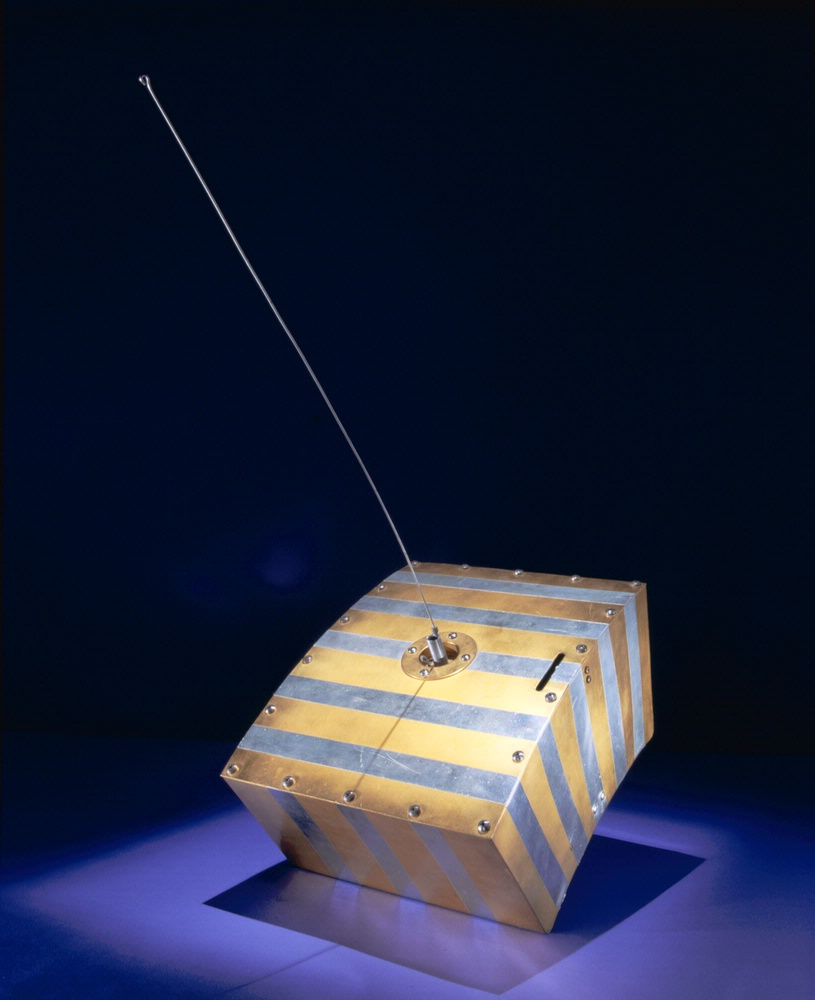
First amateur-satellite station OSCAR 1, 1961

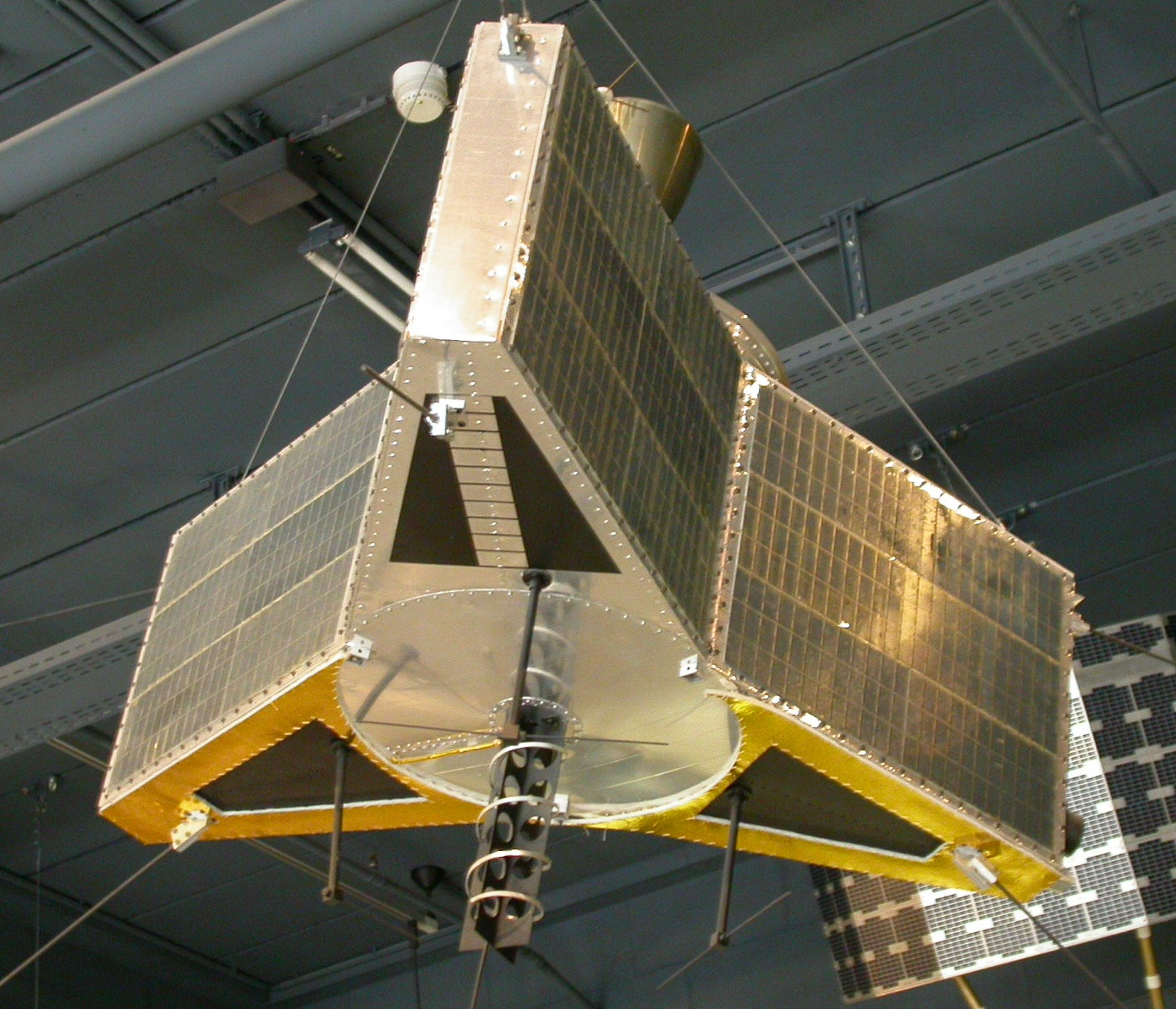
Amateur-satellite station OSCAR 10, 1983

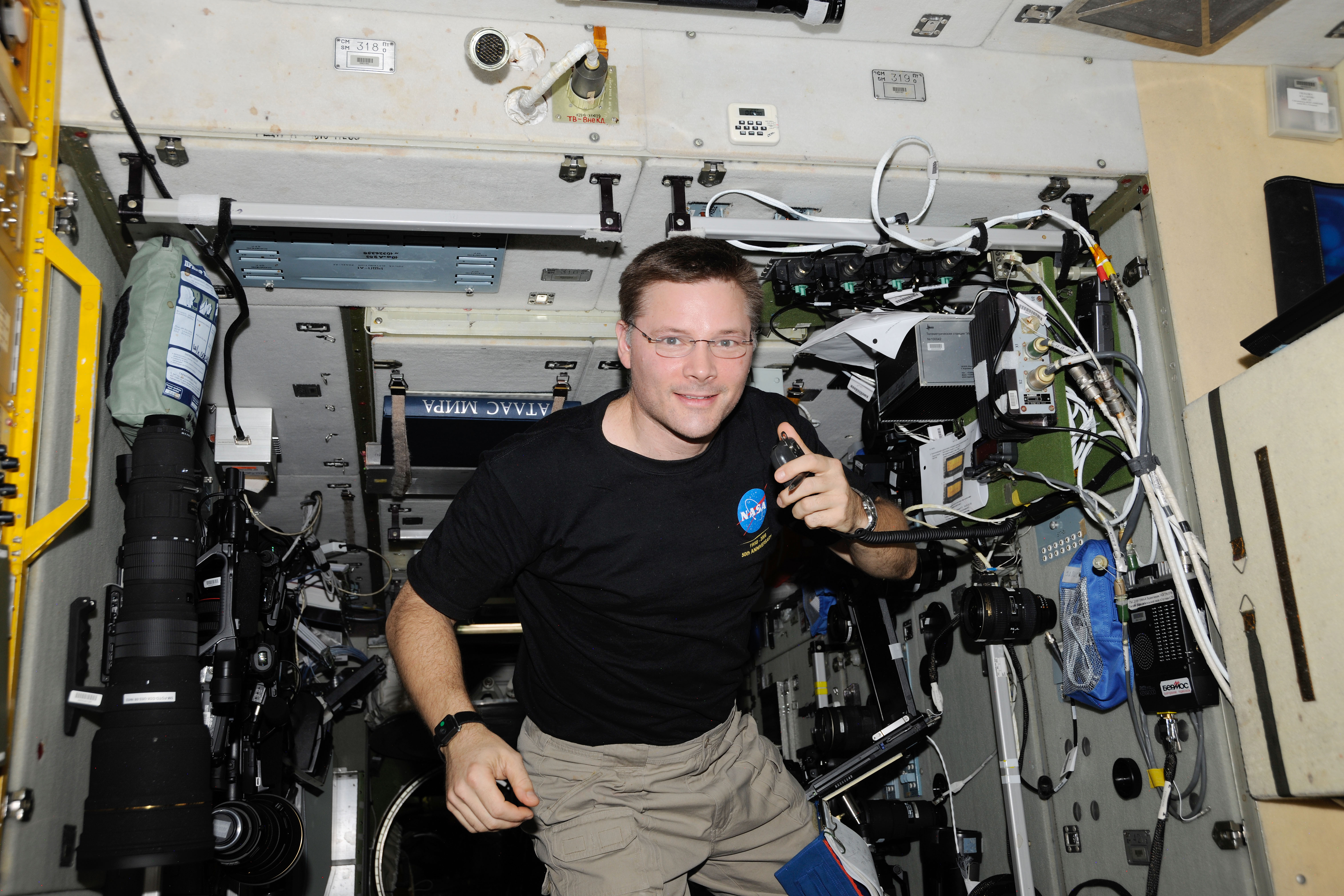
Doug Wheelock, KF5BOC, flight engineer of the Expedition 24, uses a ham radio system in the Zvezda Service Module of the ISS, 2010

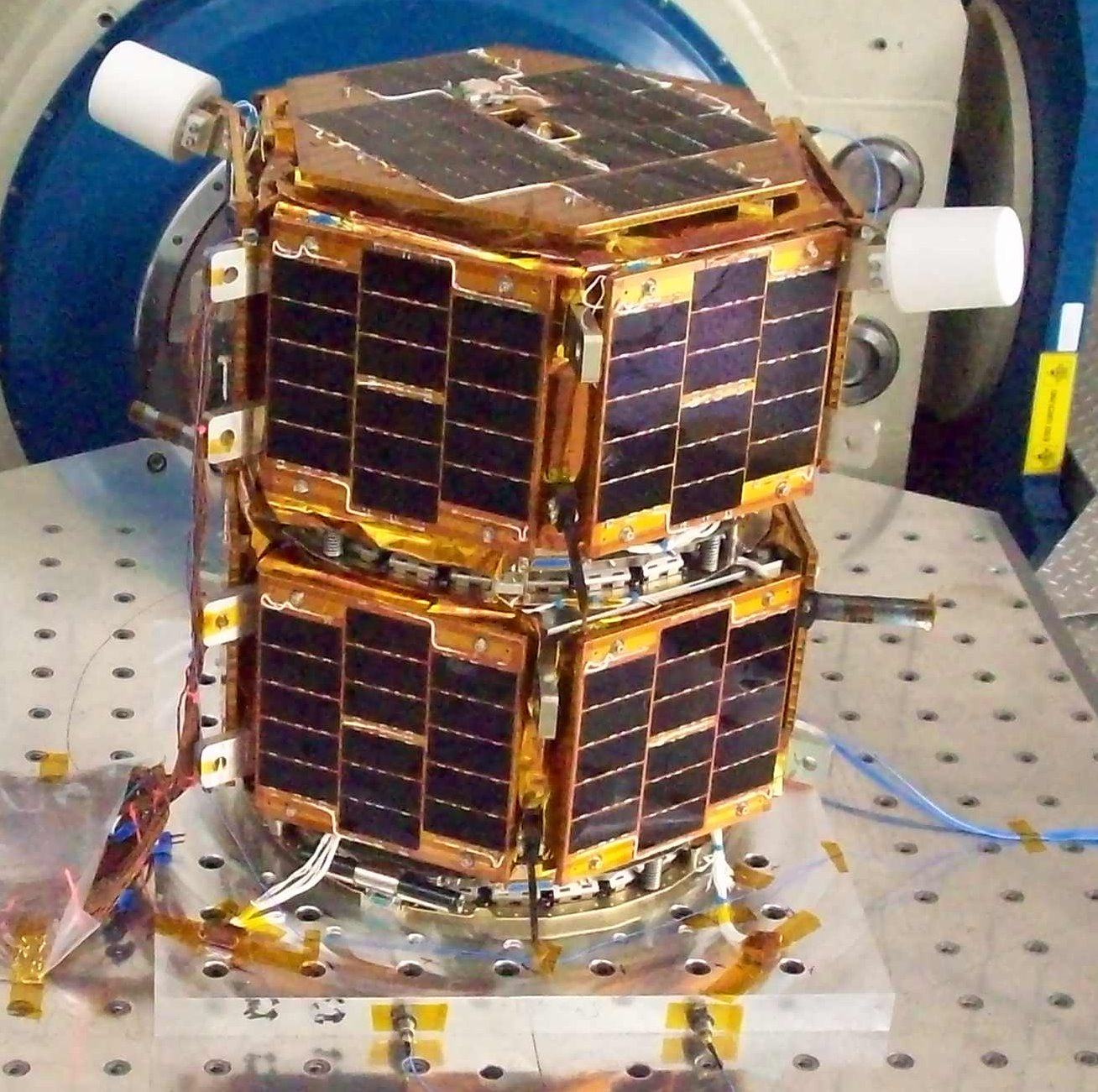
FASTRAC-A and FASTRAC-B amateur satellite, University of Texas at Austin

Amateur-satellite service (also: amateur-satellite radiocommunication service) is – according to Article 1.57 of the International Telecommunication Union's (ITU) Radio Regulations (RR) – defined as «A radiocommunication service using space stations on earth satellites for the same purposes as those of the amateur service.»

=== Classification ===
This radiocommunication service is classified in accordance with ITU Radio Regulations (article 1) as follows:
Radiocommunication service (article 1.19)

- Amateur service (article 1.56)
  - Amateur-satellite service (article 1.57)

=== Frequency allocation ===
The allocation of radio frequencies is provided according to Article 5 of the ITU Radio Regulations (edition 2012).

In order to improve harmonisation in spectrum utilisation, the majority of service-allocations stipulated in this document were incorporated in national Tables of Frequency Allocations and Utilisations which is within the responsibility of the appropriate national administration. The allocation might be primary, secondary, exclusive, and shared.

- primary allocation: is indicated by writing in capital letters (see example below)
- secondary allocation: is indicated by small letters (see example below)
- exclusive or shared utilization: is within the responsibility of national administrations

Example of frequency allocation

Allocation to services
Region 1	Region 2	Region 3
135.7–137.8 kHz FIXED MARITIME MOBILE Amateur	135.7–137.8 FIXED MARITIME MOBILE Amateur	135.7–137.8 FIXED MARITIME MOBILE RADIO NAVIGATION Amateur
7 000–7 100 AMATEUR AMATEUR-SATELLITE
14 000–14 250 AMATEUR AMATEUR-SATELLITE
18 068–18 168 AMATEUR AMATEUR-SATELLITE
21 000–21 450 AMATEUR AMATEUR-SATELLITE
24 890–24 990 AMATEUR AMATEUR-SATELLITE
28–29.7 MHz AMATEUR AMATEUR-SATELLITE
144–146 AMATEUR AMATEUR-SATELLITE
5 830–5 850 FIXED-SATELLITE (space-to-Earth) RADIOLOCATION Amateur; Amateur-satellite (space-to-Earth)	5 830–5 850 RADIOLOCATION Amateur; Amateur-satellite (space-to-Earth)	
10.5–10.6 GHz AMATEUR AMATEUR-SATELLITE
24–24.05 AMATEUR AMATEUR-SATELLITE
47–47.2 AMATEUR AMATEUR-SATELLITE
76–77.5 RADIO ASTRONOMY RADIOLOCATIONY; Amateur; Amateur-satellite; Space research (space-to-Earth)
77.5–78 AMATEUR AMATEUR-SATELLITE; Radio astronomy Space research (space-to-Earth)
78–79 RADIOLOCATION Amateur; Amateur-satellite; Radio astronomy Space research (space-to-Earth)
79–81 RADIOLOCATION RADIO ASTRONOMY; Amateur; Amateur-satellite; Space research (space-to-Earth)
134–136 AMATEUR AMATEUR-SATELLITE; Radio astronomy
136–141 RADIO ASTRONOMY RADIOLOCATION; Amateur; Amateur-satellite
241–248 RADIO ASTRONOMY RADIOLOCATION; Amateur; Amateur-satellite
248–250 AMATEUR AMATEUR-SATELLITE; Radio astronomy

=== Additional allocations ===
In addition to the formal allocations in the main table such as above, there is also a key ITU-R footnote RR 5.282 that provides for additional allocations:-

5.282 In the bands 435-438 MHz, 1 260-1 270 MHz, 2 400-2 450 MHz, 3 400-3 410 MHz (in Regions 2 and 3 only)
and 5 650-5 670 MHz, the amateur-satellite service may operate subject to not causing harmful interference to other
services operating in accordance with the Table (see No. 5.43). Administrations authorizing such use shall ensure that
any harmful interference caused by emissions from a station in the amateur-satellite service is immediately eliminated
in accordance with the provisions of No. 25.11. The use of the bands 1 260-1 270 MHz and 5 650-5 670 MHz by the
amateur-satellite service is limited to the Earth-to-space direction.

Of these, the 435-438 MHz band is particularly popular for amateur/educational small satellites such as Cubesats.

== Notes ==
- "Space Satellites from the World's Garage -- The Story of AMSAT". The Radio Amateur Satellite Corporation. Archived from the original on 2006-10-05.

- "The Extraordinary History of Amateur Radio Satellites". Space Today Online. Archived from the original on 2006-07-20.

- "A Brief History of Amateur Satellites". N7HPR. Archived from the original on August 23, 2006.

- "Satellite Development Programs". The Radio Amateur Satellite Corporation. Archived from the original on 2006-08-23.

- "Amateur (ham) Radio Satellites". Colorado State University. Archived from the original on 2006-08-31.
