= OSCAR (satellite) =

Designation of amateur radio satellites

Two-way radio communication via OSCAR 100 on 10.49 GHz (2021)

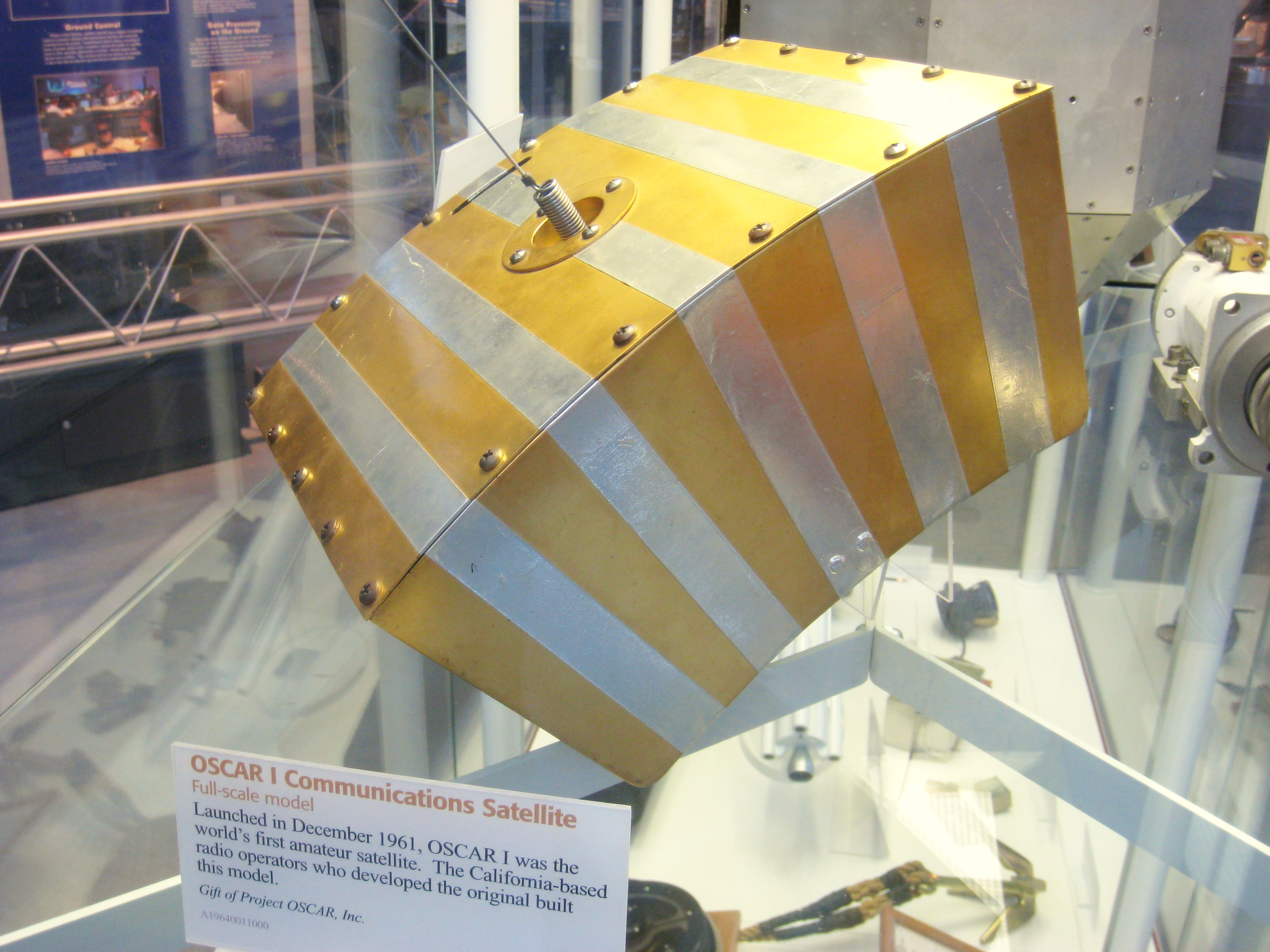
OSCAR 1, the first amateur radio satellite

OSCAR (Orbiting Satellite Carrying Amateur Radio) is a traditional designation given to many amateur radio satellites. Only satellites that enter or leave Earth's orbit fall into the OSCAR category, not suborbital spacecraft.

OSCAR satellites are administered globally by the Radio Amateur Satellite Corporation, commonly known as AMSAT.

== The first OSCAR satellite ==
The first satellite, designated OSCAR, was built by American amateur radio operators and launched into space on December 12, 1961, piggybacking on the United States Air Force's Discoverer 36 satellite. OSCAR 1 measured approximately 30 by 25 by 12 centimetres (11.8 by 9.8 by 4.7 in), weighed 4.5 kilograms (9.9 lb), orbited at altitudes between 234 to 414 kilometres (145 to 257 mi), and transmitted at a power of 140 milliwatts (0.00019 hp) on a frequency of 145 megahertz (2.07 m). It burned up in the atmosphere after seven weeks. During this time, the battery-powered satellite transmitted the Morse code letters "H" and "I" at a rate that varied depending on the temperature.

== List of OSCAR satellites ==
As of 11 June 2025, 125 satellites were launched, each receiving an OSCAR number upon reaching orbit. Details of each OSCAR satellite, including their names, launch dates, and status of the amateur radio payload is available at the list of OSCAR satellites.

== See also ==
- AMSAT
