= PCSat2 =

Amateur radio satellite created by the U.S. Naval Academy

PCSat2 is an amateur radio satellite created by the U.S. Naval Academy.

It was installed on the International Space Station on August 3, 2005. PCSAT2 was recovered from the outside of the ISS by astronauts on the 3rd EVA of mission STS-115 and was returned to Earth.

PCsat2 transmitted packet bursts every 3 minutes on 437.975 MHz. It had an UHF FM repeater on 437.975 MHz +/− 9 kHz, and 1200/9600 baud digital operation.

It also carried a PSK31 Linear/FM Satellite translator accepting 3 kHz SSB channel in the 10 meter band at 29.4 MHz and repeating that in baseband on a VHF or UHF narrow-band FM downlink. This is intended to allow multiple simultaneous full duplex narrow band communications using morse or PSK31 to be relayed by PCSat2.
