= UoSAT-5 =

British satellite

- Mission type: OSCAR, experimental
- Operator: University of Surrey
- COSPAR ID: 1991-050B
- SATCAT no.: 21575

Spacecraft properties
- Manufacturer: SSTL
- Launch mass: 50 kilograms (110 lb)
- Dimensions: 0.35 x 0.35 x 0.6 m

Start of mission
- Launch date: 17 July 1991, 01:46:31 UTC
- Rocket: Ariane 40
- Launch site: Kourou ELA-2

Orbital parameters
- Reference system: Geocentric
- Regime: Sun-synchronous
- Perigee altitude: 750 km (470 mi)
- Apogee altitude: 760 km (470 mi)
- Inclination: 98.6139 degrees
- Period: 99.9 minutes
- Epoch: 14 November 2020 03:42:14

UoSAT-5, also known as UoSAT-F, UO-22 and OSCAR 22, is a British satellite in Low Earth Orbit. It was built by Surrey Satellite Technology and launched into space in July 1991 from French Guiana.

== Mission ==
UoSAT-5 carries equipment that was similar to that on UoSAT-4, a similar satellite that failed in orbit 1 year previously. The satellite tested new technologies, including validating the performance of Gallium arsenide solar arrays.
