= $50SAT =

Amateur radio satellite launched in 2013

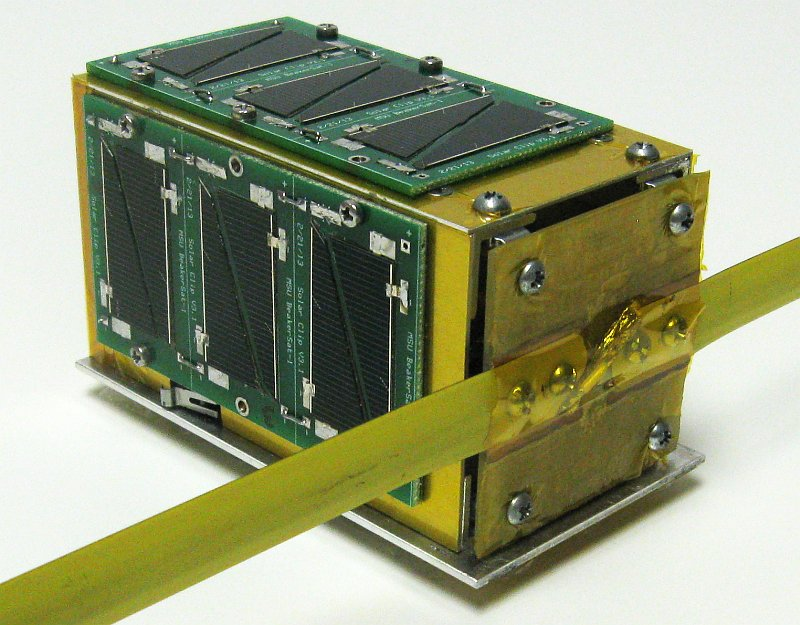
- $50SAT satellite
- Names: Eagle-2; OSCAR 76; Morehead-OSCAR 76; MO-76
- Mission type: Amateur radio communications satellite
- Operator: Morehead State University (MSU)
- COSPAR ID: 2013-066W
- SATCAT no.: 39436
- Website: www.50dollarsat.info
- Mission duration: 1 year and 8 months

Spacecraft properties
- Spacecraft type: CubeSat
- Bus: PocketQube
- Manufacturer: Morehead State University (MSU)
- Launch mass: 21 kg (46 lb)
- Dimensions: 5 × 5 × 7.5 cm (2.0 × 2.0 × 3.0 in)

Start of mission
- Launch date: 21 November 2013, 07:10 UTC
- Rocket: Dnepr
- Launch site: Dombarovskym Site 370/13
- Contractor: Yuzhmash

End of mission
- Last contact: 19 July 2015
- Decay date: 19 May 2018

Orbital parameters
- Reference system: Geocentric orbit
- Regime: Low Earth orbit
- Perigee altitude: 376 km (234 mi)
- Apogee altitude: 382 km (237 mi)
- Inclination: 97.70°
- Period: 92.00 minutes

Transponders
- Frequency: Downlink: 437.505 MHz

$50SAT (also known as Eagle-2, OSCAR 76, Morehead-OSCAR 76 and MO-76) is an American amateur radio communications satellite. It was launched on November 21, 2013, with a Dnepr launch vehicle from the Dombarovsky Air Base, in Orenburg, Russia. It was part of the UNISAT-5 satellite program by GAUSS (Group of Astrodynamics for the Use of Space Systems).

$50SAT was developed by Bob Twiggs at Morehead State University (MSU) along with three other radio amateurs and was used to train students. The satellite transmits telemetry data in various operating modes in the 70 cm (28 in) band. It is based on the PocketQube design for very small and inexpensive satellites and measures 5 × 5 × 7.5 cm (2.0 × 2.0 × 3.0 in) (1.5 CubeSat). After several months of problems due to low battery voltage, $50SAT finally dropped below the 3.3 volts required for data transmission on July 19, 2015, and thus ceased operation.

== Objective ==
The objective of $50SAT was to see if a viable satellite could be built to the PocketQube standard.

== See also ==
- OSCAR

== Notes ==
The sequence of $50SAT transmissions repeats approximately every 75 seconds. An FM slow Morse call sign beacon, data as fast FM Morse, FSK RTTY data and digital data telemetry.

The slow Morse call sign beacon can be picked up on a hand held UHF receiver when the distance to $50SAT is approximately 800 km or less. The received signal can be improved significantly by using a simple gain antenna such as a BiQuad, Moxon or small Yagi.

The FSK RTTY data has been decoded at up to approximately 2400 km using an omni directional antenna and low noise amplifier.

Digital data telemetry packets (1 kbit/s) from $50SAT can be received with a ground based RFM22B receiver at approximately 750 km using a low noise amplifier and omni directional antenna, with a considerable improvement in reception range when a small yagi is used. The T-LogoQube team have reported that their high gain yagi tracking antenna allowed them to send and receive data telemetry packets at up to 2700 km.

Together with T-LogoQube (Eagle1), QubeScout-S1 and WREN, $50SAT was the first of the new PocketQube standard satellites to be launched.

The primary purpose of $50SAT was to evaluate if PocketQubes would be a cost effective means for engineering and science students to use for developing real world skills.

$50SAT has demonstrated that very low cost satellites are viable in low Earth orbit. The low build cost of $50SAT (less than $250 in parts) means that Engineering models are readily affordable by schools and colleges. The PocketQube chassis has no precision mechanical parts and can be built from locally obtained sheet metal.

The electronics consist of two 40mm square circuit boards. The first is the processor/radio board with the PICAXE 40X2 processor, the Hope RFM22B transceiver module, a temperature sensor, latchup and watchdog protection devices. The second board is the solar power control and monitor board. This board contains the maximum power point controllers as well as current monitors for the battery and summed solar power. The battery is a common 3.7V lithium ion camera battery.

$50SAT was a collaborative education project between Professor Bob Twiggs, Morehead State University and 3 radio amateurs, Howie DeFelice, AB2S, Michael Kirkhart, KD8QBA, and Stuart Robinson, GW7HPW.
