= Radar Fence Transponder =

Amateur radio satellite

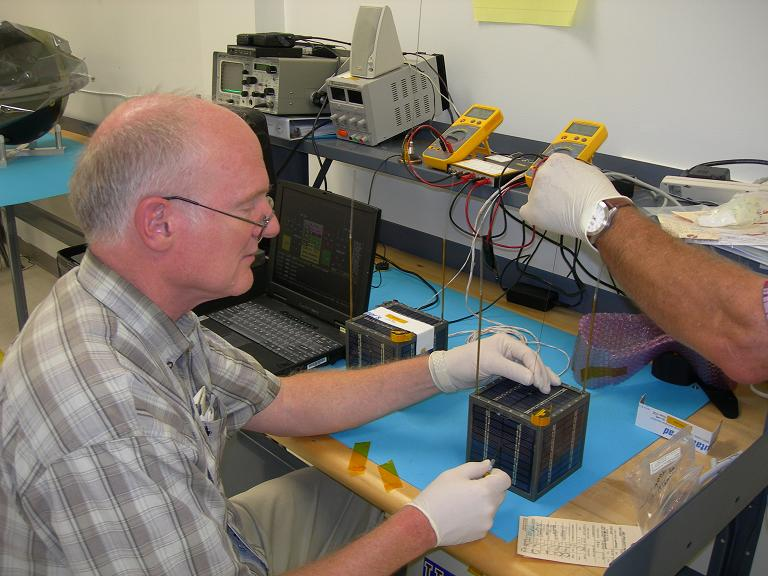
- Mission type: Communications
- Operator: U.S. Naval Academy
- COSPAR ID: 2006-055C
- SATCAT no.: 29661
- Website: www.usna.edu/Users/aero/bruninga/raft.html

Spacecraft properties
- Launch mass: 3 kg (6.6 lb)

Start of mission
- Launch date: 21 December 2006, 01:47 UTC
- Rocket: Space Shuttle Discovery
- Launch site: Kennedy LC-39B
- Contractor: NASA

End of mission
- Decay date: 30 May 2007

Orbital parameters
- Reference system: Geocentric
- Regime: Low Earth
- Perigee altitude: 228 km (142 mi)
- Apogee altitude: 254 km (158 mi)
- Inclination: 51.6°
- Period: 89.3 minutes

Radar Fence Transponder (also called Navy-OSCAR 60 or RAFT 1) was an amateur radio satellite that was developed and built for training purposes at the United States Naval Academy. The 3 kg (6.6 lb) heavy RAFT had a cubic structure of 12.7 cm (5.0 in) edge length and therefore did not meet the Cubesat standard. Solar cells on all six sides of the satellite were used to supply energy. It had neither position control nor drive systems.

RAFT contained a receiver at 216.98 MHz for calibration experiments of the U.S. Navy Space Surveillance Radar. For amateur radio connections there was an AX.25 digipeater on 145.825 MHz with built-in speech synthesizer on board.

Two fixed antennas equipped with springs were used for communication and also as a separation system for the almost identical sister satellite MARScom. Furthermore, a 122 cm (48 in) long wire antenna made of 0.5 mm (0.020 in) nitinol wire for the 10 m amateur radio band was unwound on shortwave during the disconnection process, with which the satellite received signals in the PSK31 operating mode.

== Mission ==
The satellite was released on 21 December 2006 with Space Shuttle Discovery (STS-116) from Kennedy Space Center, Florida.

On 30 May 2007, it was re-entered on Earth atmosphere.

== See also ==
- OSCAR
