= UoSAT-4 =

Failed British Low Earth Orbit Satellite

- Mission type: OSCAR
- Operator: University of Surrey
- COSPAR ID: 1990-005C
- SATCAT no.: 20438

Spacecraft properties
- Manufacturer: SSTL

Start of mission
- Launch date: 22 January 1990, 01:35:27 UTC
- Rocket: Ariane 40
- Launch site: Kourou ELA-2

Orbital parameters
- Reference system: Geocentric
- Regime: Sun-synchronous
- Perigee altitude: 780 km (480 mi)
- Apogee altitude: 796 km (495 mi)
- Inclination: 98.8074 degrees
- Period: 100.6 minutes
- Epoch: 15 April 2019, 20:59

UoSAT-4, also known as UO-15 and OSCAR-15, is a British satellite in Low Earth Orbit. It was built by a spin-off company of the University of Surrey, Surrey Satellite Technology (SSTL) and launched in January 1990 from French Guiana.

UoSAT-4 was launched on the same rocket as its sister satellite, UoSAT-3.

== Mission ==
UoSAT-4 carried equipment to supplement UoSAT-3, but failed after two days in orbit.

The satellite forms part of the growing amounts of orbital debris orbiting around the Earth. The payload will decay in the Earth's atmosphere some time in the future.
