= OSCAR 8 =

American amateur radio satellite

- Mission type: Amateur Radio Satellite
- Operator: AMSAT
- COSPAR ID: 1978-026B
- SATCAT no.: 10703
- Mission duration: 5 years, 3 months and 18 days

Spacecraft properties
- Launch mass: 27.2 kilograms (60 lb)
- Dimensions: 38 cm × 38 cm × 33 cm (15 in × 15 in × 13 in)
- Power: 15 W

Start of mission
- Launch date: 5 March 1978, 17:54 UTC
- Rocket: Delta-2910 139
- Launch site: Vandenberg SLC-2W

End of mission
- Last contact: 24 June 1983

Orbital parameters
- Reference system: Geocentric
- Regime: Low Earth
- Semi-major axis: 7,274.0 km (4,519.9 mi)
- Perigee altitude: 899.1 km (558.7 mi)
- Apogee altitude: 907.8 km (564.1 mi)
- Inclination: 99.0291°
- Period: 102.9 minutes
- Epoch: 6 February 2020

OSCAR 8 (also called AO-08, Phase 2D or Amsat P2D) is an American amateur radio satellite. It was developed and built by radio amateurs of the AMSAT and launched on March 5, 1978 as a secondary payload together with the Earth observation satellite Landsat 3 from Vandenberg Air Force Base, California, United States.

The satellite had two linear transponders, from the 2-meter band (uplink) to the 10-meter band and the 70-centimeter band (downlink).

== Frequencies ==
=== Transponder 1 ===
- Uplink (MHz): 145.850 - 145.900
- Downlink (MHz): 29.400 - 29.500
- Beacon (MHz): 29.402
- Mode: SSB CW

=== Transponder 2 ===
- Uplink (MHz): 145.900 - 146.000
- Downlink (MHz): 435.200 - 435.100
- Beacon (MHz): 435.095
- Mode: SSB CW
