= Orbiting Picosat Automatic Launcher =

U.S. amateur radio satellite

Orbiting Picosat Automatic Launcher (also known as OPAL-OSCAR 38, SQUIRT 2 and OO-38) is an American technology testing and amateur radio satellite that was developed by students at the Space Systems Development Laboratory at Stanford University in Palo Alto, California. The aim was to test the feasibility of launching several picosatellites from one parent satellite. The satellite's secondary payloads are an accelerometer testbed and a magnetometer testbed, which will perform component characterization. The main satellite ejected 6 nanosatellites in orbit (MEMS 1A, MEMS 1B, STENSAT, MASAT (JAK), Artemis-Thelma and Artemis-Louise). The development started in 1995 and was completed in May 1999.

OPAL was launched on January 27, 2000 together with JAWSAT with a Minotaur I rocket from Vandenberg Air Force Base, California.
