= HADES (satellite) =

Spanish amateur radio satellite

- Names: HADES; Spain-OSCAR 115; SO-115
- Mission type: Communications
- Operator: AMSAT EA
- COSPAR ID: 2022-002DA
- SATCAT no.: 51080

Spacecraft properties
- Spacecraft: PocketQube (1.5P)
- Manufacturer: AMSAT EA
- Launch mass: 0.2 kg (0.44 lb)
- Dimensions: 5 cm × 5 cm × 7.5 cm (2.0 in × 2.0 in × 3.0 in)

Start of mission
- Launch date: 13 January 2022, 10:25 UTC
- Rocket: Falcon-9 137/B1058.10
- Launch site: Cape Canaveral SLC-40
- Contractor: SpaceX

Orbital parameters
- Reference system: Geocentric orbit
- Regime: Low Earth orbit
- Semi-major axis: 6,896 kilometres (4,285 mi)
- Perigee altitude: 517 km (321 mi)
- Apogee altitude: 543 km (337 mi)
- Inclination: 97.5°
- Period: 95 minutes

HADES, Spain-OSCAR 115 or SO-115, is a Spanish amateur radio satellite.

== Specifications ==
HADES was designed and built jointly by AMSAT-EA and students from the European University of Madrid, Spain. The satellite is a PocketQube form factor 1.5P nano-satellite (5 × 5 × 7.5 cm) and carries an FM repeater using the callsign AM6SAT. Another payload comes from the University of Brno and consists of a miniature camera module that transmits the captured images as an audio signal in SSTV mode. The SSTV formats it uses are compatible with Robot36, Robot72, MP73 and MP115. This design is based on that of PSAT-2.

== Mission ==
The satellite was launched on January 13, 2022, from Cape Canaveral Space Force Station, Florida, United States. On January 16, signals from the satellite could be received and assigned. On January 23, 2022, the designation Spain-OSCAR-115 or SO-115 was awarded by the OSCAR number coordinator of AMSAT-NA.

Frequencies
436.888 MHz downlink	FM
145.925 MHz uplink	FM

== See also ==
- OSCAR
