= PSAT-2 =

Amateur radio satellite of the United States

- Mission type: Communications
- Operator: U.S. Naval Academy
- COSPAR ID: 2019-036R
- SATCAT no.: 44354
- Mission duration: 5 years, 9 months and 2 days

Spacecraft properties
- Bus: CubeSat (1.5U)
- Launch mass: 2 kilograms (4.4 lb)

Start of mission
- Launch date: 25 June 2019, 06:30 UTC
- Rocket: Falcon Heavy
- Launch site: Kennedy LC-39A
- Contractor: SpaceX

End of mission
- Decay date: 13-15 Feb 2023 (Predicted)

Orbital parameters
- Reference system: Geocentric
- Regime: Low Earth
- Semi-major axis: 6,941.0 kilometres (4,312.9 mi)
- Perigee altitude: 309.8 kilometres (192.5 mi)
- Apogee altitude: 831.1 kilometres (516.4 mi)
- Inclination: 28.5306°
- Period: 95.9 minutes
- Epoch: 3 February 2020

Transponders
- Band: FM

PSAT-2 is an experimental amateur radio satellite from the U.S. Naval Academy, which was developed in collaboration with the Technical University of Brno in Brno, Czech Republic. AMSAT North America's OSCAR number administrator assigned number 104 to this satellite; in the amateur radio community it is therefore also called Navy-OSCAR 104, short NO-104.

== Mission ==
PSAT-2 was launched on June 25, 2019 with a Falcon Heavy from Kennedy Space Center, Florida, United States, as part of Mission STP-2 (Space Test Program 2) as one of 24 satellites. In August 2019, the VHF payload failed and control of the satellite was lost. However, after nearly two years of downtime, the payload mysteriously reactivated and control was regained.

== Frequencies ==
The following frequencies for the satellite were coordinated by the International Amateur Radio Union:

- 145.825 MHz - Uplink and downlink APRS digipeater, 1200 bd (once again functional as of 2021)
- 435.350 MHz - Downlink PSK31 and SSTV
- 29.4815 MHz - Uplink PSK31

== See also ==
- OSCAR
