= MESAT 1 =

American amateur radio satellite

- Names: MESAT 1 Maine Satellite 1 MESAT1-OSCAR 122; MO-122
- Mission type: Communications
- Operator: University of Maine
- COSPAR ID: 2024-125G
- SATCAT no.: 60209
- Website: umaine.edu/wisenetlab/mesat1

Spacecraft properties
- Spacecraft: Cubesat (3U)
- Manufacturer: University of Maine
- Dimensions: 30 cm × 10 cm × 10 cm (11.8 in × 3.9 in × 3.9 in)

Start of mission
- Launch date: July 4, 2024, 04:04 UTC
- Rocket: Firefly Alpha
- Launch site: Vandenberg SLC-2W
- Contractor: Firefly Aerospace

Orbital parameters
- Reference system: Geocentric orbit
- Regime: Low Earth orbit
- Semi-major axis: 6,834 kilometres (4,246 mi)
- Perigee altitude: 449.4 km (279.2 mi)
- Apogee altitude: 476.8 km (296.3 mi)
- Inclination: 97.3°
- Period: 93.7 minutes
- Epoch: June 28, 2025

MESAT 1, MESAT1-OSCAR 122 or MO-122 is an American university and amateur radio satellite.

== Mission ==
On 4 July 2024, MESAT 1 was launched on a Firefly Alpha launch vehicle from Vandenberg Space Force Base in California, United States. The amateur radio transponder became operational on 20 September 2024. On 2 October 2024, the OSCAR Numbers Coordinator assigned the designation MESAT1-OSCAR-122 or MO-122 to AMSAT-NA.

MESAT 1, developed by the University of Maine, carries three experimental payloads for university research, a transmitter for commercial Globalstar, and a linear transponder provided by AMSAT for use by amateur radio operators worldwide.

The three university experiments are:

- ALBEDO: This payload investigates the effects of albedo (the fraction of solar radiation reflected back to space) on local temperatures.
- IMAGER: A remote sensing instrument for imaging shallow coastal waters to determine water quality characteristics such as turbidity and phytoplankton concentration.
- HAB: A payload for investigating atmospheric influences on harmful algal blooms.

Frequencies
| 435.81 - 435.84 MHz downlink | USB |
| 145.91 MHz - 145.94 MHz uplink | LSB |
| 435.80 MHz - 435.790 MHz Telemetry | 1200 baud BPSK |

== See also ==
- OSCAR
