= UoSAT-3 =

British low Earth orbit satellite, 1990–1999

- Mission type: OSCAR
- Operator: University of Surrey
- COSPAR ID: 1990-005B
- SATCAT no.: 20437

Spacecraft properties
- Manufacturer: SSTL

Start of mission
- Launch date: 22 January 1990, 01:35:27 UTC
- Rocket: Ariane 40
- Launch site: Kourou ELA-2

Orbital parameters
- Reference system: Geocentric
- Regime: Sun-synchronous
- Perigee altitude: 776 km (482 mi)
- Apogee altitude: 792 km (492 mi)
- Inclination: 98.7491 degrees
- Period: 100.5 minutes
- Epoch: 15 April 2019, 21:11 UTC

UoSAT-3, also known as UO-14 and OSCAR-14, is a British satellite in Low Earth Orbit. It was built by a spin-off company of the University of Surrey, Surrey Satellite Technology (SSTL) and launched in January 1990 from French Guiana. The satellite functioned as one of a series of OSCAR satellite in orbit around the Earth, as well as observing Earth and performing scientific experiments.

UoSAT-3 was launched on the same rocket as its sister satellite, UoSAT-4.

== Current status ==
UoSAT-3 exceeded its expected operational life by 3 years and ceased active service in 1999. However, amateur radio enthusiasts managed to track the satellite for a certain amount of time afterwards via the satellite's FM voice transponder.

The satellite, which is now non-operational, forms a part of the growing amounts of space debris orbiting around the Earth. The payload will decay in the Earth's atmosphere some time in the future.
