= SEDSAT-1 =

American amateur radio satellite

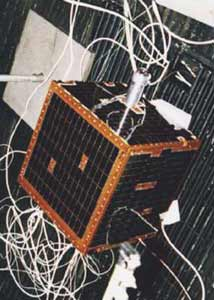
- SEDSAT-1 satellite.
- Mission type: Communications
- Operator: AMSAT
- COSPAR ID: 1998-061B
- SATCAT no.: 25509

Spacecraft properties
- Manufacturer: University of Alabama
- Launch mass: 35 kg (77 lb)
- Dimensions: 32.13 cm × 32.13 cm × 35.43 cm (12.65 in × 12.65 in × 13.95 in)

Start of mission
- Launch date: 24 October 1998, 12:08 UTC
- Rocket: Delta-7326 D-261
- Launch site: Cape Canaveral SLC-17A

Orbital parameters
- Reference system: Geocentric
- Regime: Low Earth
- Eccentricity: 0.03699
- Perigee altitude: 547 kilometres (340 mi)
- Apogee altitude: 1,079 kilometres (670 mi)
- Inclination: 31.4°
- Period: 101 minutes
- Epoch: 24 October 1998

SEDSAT-1 (also known as SEDSAT-OSCAR 33) is a U.S. amateur radio satellite built by students and developed at the University of Alabama in Huntsville (UAH).

The microsatellite bears the name of one of its sponsoring organizations, the Students for the Exploration and Development of Space (SEDS). It was launched into a low Earth orbit on October 24, 1998 as a Secondary payload with the Deep Space 1 spacecraft using a Delta II rocket at Cape Canaveral Air Force Station, Florida, USA.

== History ==
The satellite was to be built by the partnership between NASA's Marshall Space Flight Center and UAH with the primary objective of testing a newly developed small expendable deployer system developed for NASA's Space Shuttle, while allowing the students to add instrumentation to complete secondary missions after the primary data regarding the deployer's tether system had been captured. After the Tethered Satellite System (TSS-1R) experienced a failure resulting in the ignition of a strong electrical discharge shortly after being deployed from the Space Shuttle Columbia in 1996, the small expendable deployer system was subject to a Space Shuttle safety review that resulted in extensive design and requirements changes. As a result, SEDSAT-1 became a free-flying secondary payload on the Delta II, after securing sponsorship from other governmental and commercial partners.

== Mission ==
The satellite was intended to have a novel link to the internet that would allow amateur radio operators from around the globe to request and receive imagery from the satellite anytime it flew overhead. To this end, the satellite carries two cameras as part of the SEASIS (SEDS, earth, atmosphere, and space imaging system) instrument. SEDSAT-1 also includes instruments which monitor battery performance management and control. After launch, telemetry data was received at the satellite's university led mission control center at the University of Arizona in Tucson, AZ. However, an uplink could never be established and no photographic data could be received from the SEASIS instrument. The telemetry data received from the satellite did allow for some of the battery control experiments to be received, and as of 2013 the satellite is still active.

== Frequency ==
- Downlink: 437.91 MHz
- Mode: 9600 bps FSK

== See also ==
- OSCAR

== Bibliography ==
- Mark W. Maier, Shi-Tsan Wu: SEDSAT-1 lessons learned. In: F.-B. Hsiao (Hrsg.): Microsatellites as research tools. Elsevier, Amsterdam 1999, pg. 365–375.
- Students for the Exploration and Development of Space Satellite. In: NASA Historical Data Book, Volume VII. Government Printing Office, Washington, D.C. 2009, pg. 669–671
