= HuskySat-1 =

Artificial satellite

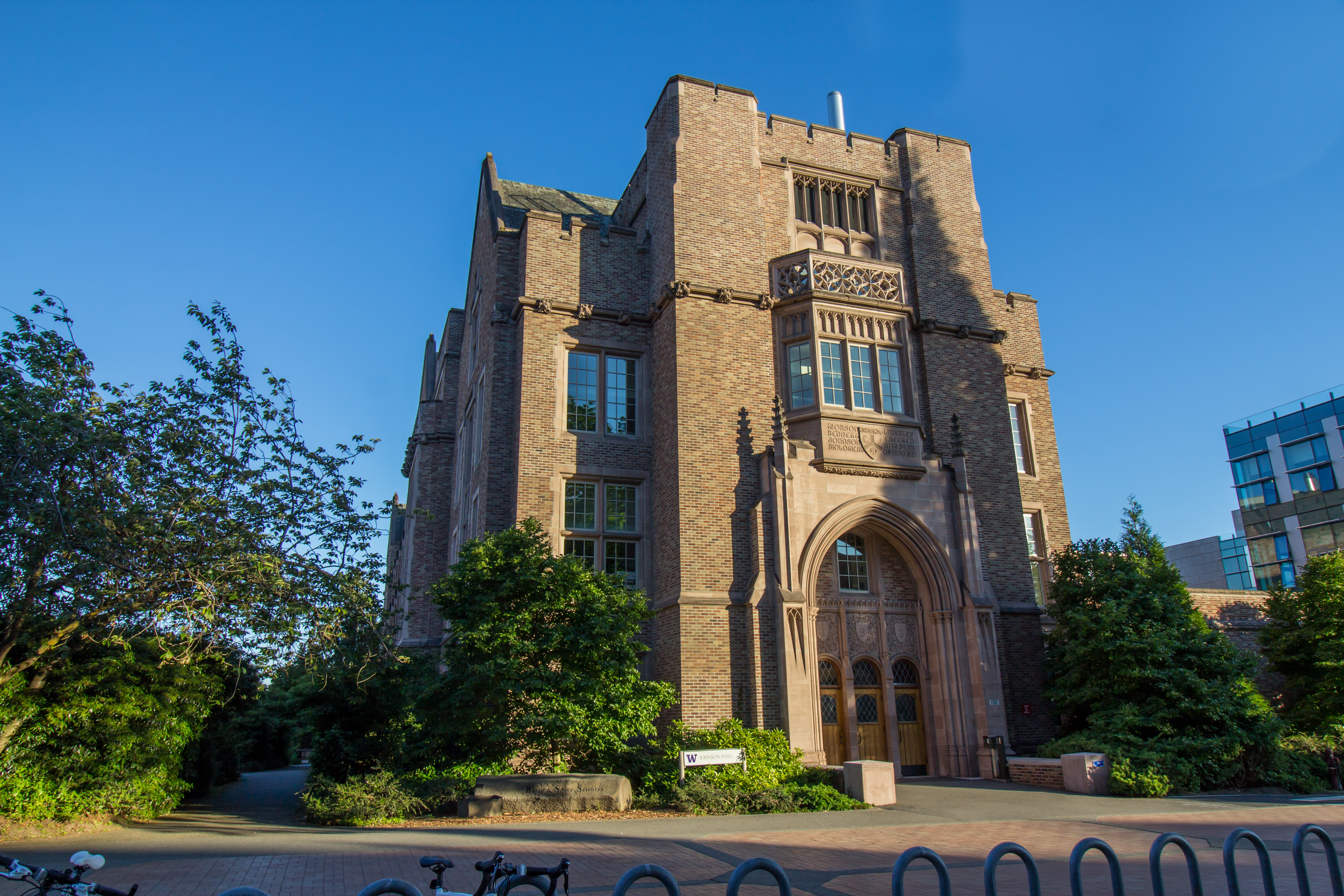
Johnson Hall at University of Washington, Seattle, where HuskySat-1 was designed and controlled

HuskySat-1 (or OSCAR 107) is an artificial satellite designed at the University of Washington. It was launched by Cygnus NG-12 from Mid-Atlantic Regional Spaceport Launch Pad 0 on Wallops Island, Virginia to low earth orbit on November 2, 2019. It is a CubeSat, and will demonstrate onboard plasma propulsion and high gain telemetry for low Earth orbit that would be a precursor for an attempt at a larger CubeSat designed for orbital insertion at the Moon.

The satellite was designed by Husky Satellite Lab, a registered student group, in Johnson Hall, and was controlled from there using three antennae installed on the roof.

A pulsed plasma thruster (PPT) provides propulsion. It is the first PPT to use sulfur as a fuel.

Students at Raisbeck Aviation High School designed an onboard camera.

The satellite will test an experimental 24 GHz data transmitter, after which it will become an amateur radio satellite operated by AMSAT. The high data rate will enable much more data to be transferred during the 9- to 15-minute time windows the satellite is visible from the control station.

HuskySat is the first satellite designed by students in Washington state.

The satellite decayed from orbit on 12 April 2023.

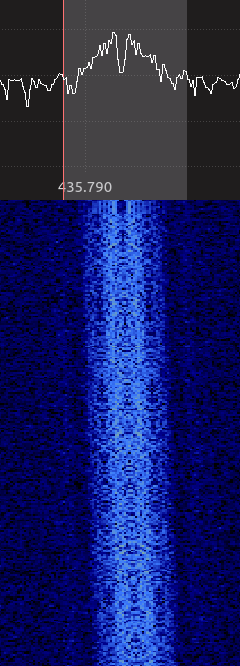
The slant in the waterfall is due to the Doppler shift of the signal as its elevation decreases at the end of its pass.

Audio recording of HuskySat-1 1K2 BPSK TLM (recorded with USB demodulator, 3 kHz width filter).
