= Nepal PQ-1 =

Nepal-made pico satellite

SanoSat-1
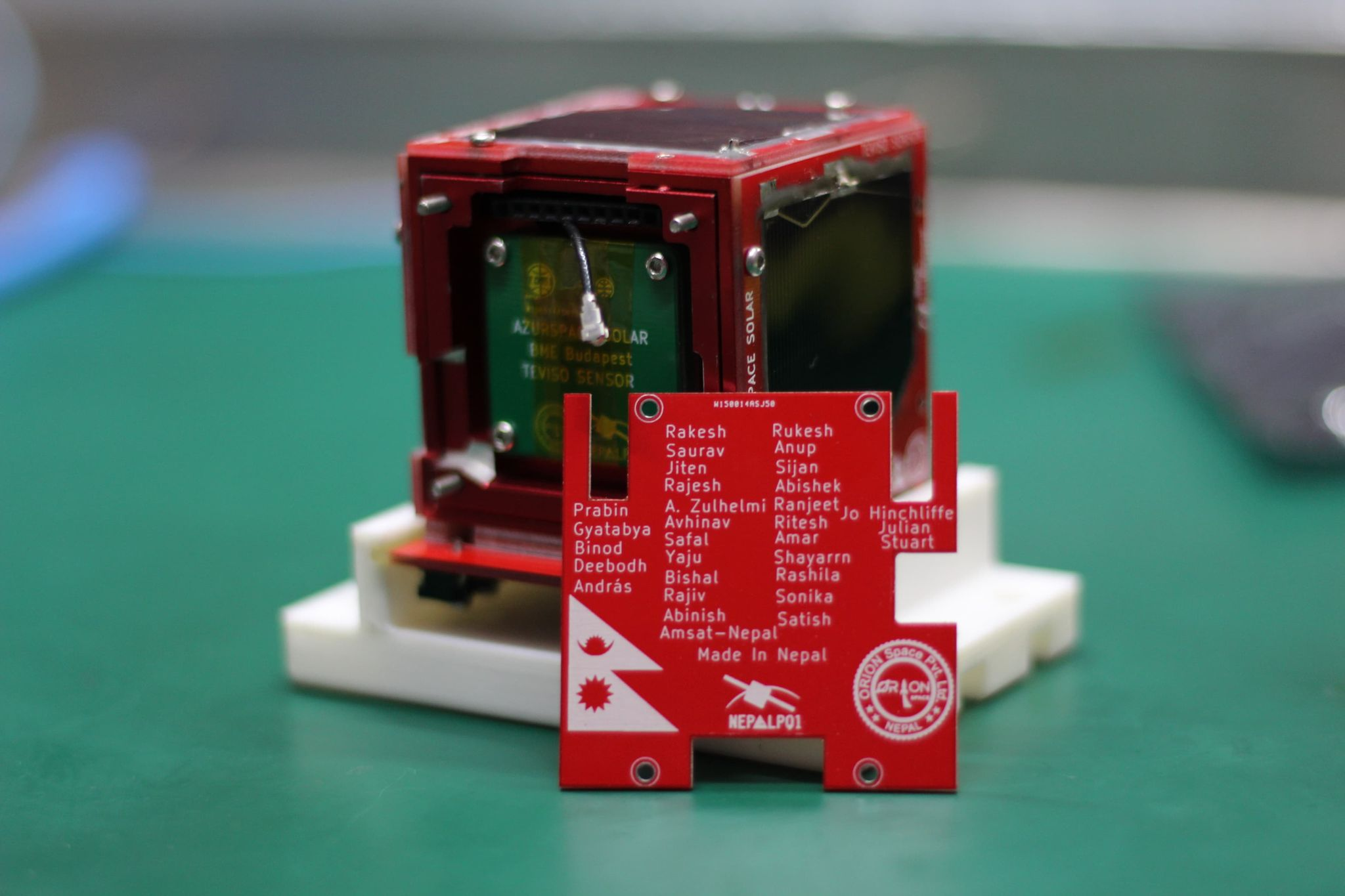
- SanoSat-1 with the list of contributors
- Mission type: Space Engineering
- Operator: AMSAT-Nepal
- COSPAR ID: 2022-002W
- SATCAT no.: 51004
- Mission duration: Elapsed: 3 years, 11 months and 10 days

Spacecraft properties
- Manufacturer: ORION Space

Start of mission
- Launch date: January 13, 2022
- Rocket: Falcon 9
- Launch site: Cape Canaveral Space Force Station

Nepal-PQ1 (also known as SanoSat-1 and OSCAR 116) is Nepal's first PocketQube picosatellite developed by ORION Space that was launched on January 13, 2022, from Falcon 9. The primary function of the satellite is to collect wind, temperature, and humidity data and communicate findings with ground stations in Nepal.

== Background ==
The PocketQube is developed by ORION Space in collaboration with AMSAT-Nepal and AMSAT-EA, with the brokerage service offered by FOSSA Systems, a leading aerospace company focused on developing picosatellites for IoT communications. SanoSat-1 is a PocketQube of 1P size designed and developed with readily available commercial components (COTS) to measure space radiation while orbiting, and periodically transmit it to Earth. The satellite will act as a digital repeater in an amateur band. The store and forward concept can be used in remote disaster-prone locations. The same concept can also be used to collect data from ground-based sensors, store it on board, and transmit it to Earth's main station. The picosatellite has successfully passed all Environmental Testing Campaigns and is on its way to Cape Canaveral (Florida, USA), where it will be launched with SpaceX's Falcon 9 vehicle. The satellite has a mass of 250 grams.

== Specifications ==
Section Source

=== SANOSAT-1 ===
- Country: Nepal
- Type: PocketQube
- Organisation: ORION Space

== See also ==
- NepaliSat-1
