= Saudi-OSCAR 50 =

Saudi Arabian amateur radio satellite

SAUDI-OSCAR 50, Saudisat 1C
- Operator: King Abdulaziz University for Science & Technology
- COSPAR ID: 2002-058C
- SATCAT no.: 27607
- Website: https://www.kacst.edu.sa/
- Mission duration: Elapsed: 23 years, 2 months and 26 days

Spacecraft properties
- Launch mass: 10 kg

Start of mission
- Launch date: 20 December 2002
- Rocket: Dnepr
- Launch site: Baikonur Cosmodrome

Orbital parameters
- Reference system: Geocentric
- Regime: Low Earth
- Perigee altitude: 603 km
- Apogee altitude: 713 km
- Inclination: 64.56 degrees
- Period: 97.89 minutes

Saudi-OSCAR 50 is a Saudi Arabian amateur radio satellite that was launched on 20 December 2002 by the King Abdulaziz City for Science and Technology.

== Technical information ==
SO-50 carries several experiments, including an amateur radio repeater experiment. The transponder receives on 145.850 MHz FM and retransmits on 436.795-436.780 MHz. The transponder is available to amateurs worldwide as power permits. The receiver has a sensitivity of -124 dBm, having a bandwidth of 15 kHz. The receive antenna is a 1/4 wave vertical mounted in the top corner of the spacecraft. The receive audio is filtered and conditioned then gated in the control electronics prior to feeding it to the 250 mW UHF transmitter. The downlink antenna is a 1/4 wave mounted in the bottom corner of the spacecraft and canted at 45 degrees inward.
