= Fox-1B =

American amateur radio satellite

- Names: AO-91; AMSAT OSCAR 91
- Mission type: Communications
- Operator: AMSAT
- COSPAR ID: 2017-073E
- SATCAT no.: 43017

Spacecraft properties
- Manufacturer: Vanderbilt University; Radio Amateur Satellite Corporation
- Launch mass: 1.3 kg (2.9 lb)
- Dimensions: 10 cm × 10 cm × 10 cm (3.9 in × 3.9 in × 3.9 in)

Start of mission
- Launch date: 18 November 2017, 09:47:36 UTC
- Rocket: Delta II 7920-10C (Delta D378)
- Launch site: Vandenberg, SLC-2W
- Contractor: United Launch Alliance

Orbital parameters
- Reference system: Geocentric orbit
- Regime: Low Earth orbit
- Perigee altitude: 461.3 km (286.6 mi)
- Apogee altitude: 823.7 km (511.8 mi)
- Inclination: 97.70°
- Period: 97.40 minutes

Fox-1B, AO-91 or AMSAT OSCAR 91 is a United States amateur radio satellite. It is a 1U Cubesat, was built by the AMSAT-NA and carries a single-channel transponder for FM radio. The satellite has a whip antenna for the 70 cm and 23 cm bands (uplink), and a second antenna for the 2 m band (downlink). Fox-1B is the second amateur radio satellite of the Fox series of AMSAT North America.

To facilitate a satellite launch as part of NASA's Educational Launch of Nanosatellites (ELaNa) program, the satellite carries a student experiment conducted by Vanderbilt University's Institute for Space and Defense Electronics. The RadFx experiment at this institute hosts four payloads for the study of radiation effects on commercially available electronic components. So it should be tested electronic components "off the shelf" under space conditions. The payload of AMSAT North America is a single-channel FM converter from Ultra high frequency (UHF) to Very high frequency (VHF). After successful launch, the satellite was assigned the OSCAR number 91.

== Mission ==
The satellite was launched on 18 November 2017, with a Delta II launch vehicle, along with the main payload Joint Polar Satellite System (JPSS) NOAA-20 and 4 other Cubesat satellites (MiRaTA, Buccaneer RMM, EagleSat and MakerSat 0) from Vandenberg Air Force Base. After only a few hours, telemetry was received and the transponder put into operation.

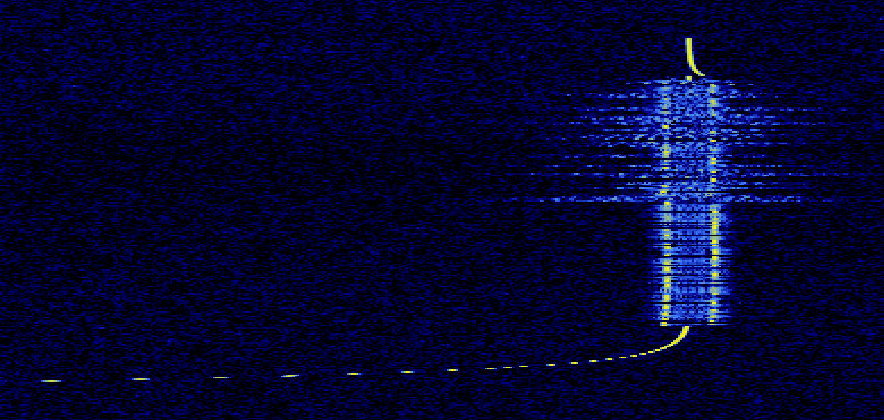
Fox-1B Transponder Mode Beacon Waterfall.

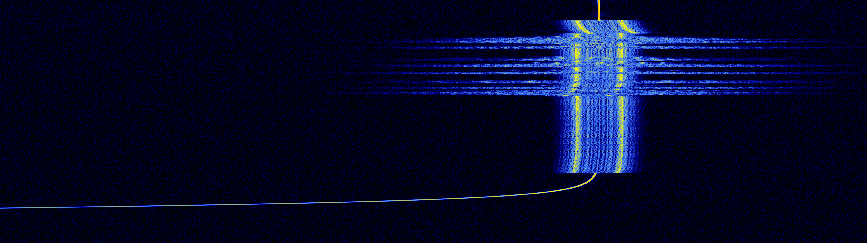
A screen capture of the Fox-1B safe mode beacon, taken with GQRX.

Fox-1B Transponder Mode Beacon.

AO-91 safe mode beacon.

Frequencies
| 145.960 MHz downlink | FM |
| 435.250 MHz uplink | 67.0 Hz CTCSS |

== See also ==
- OSCAR
