= AMSAT-OSCAR 10 =

Star-shaped German AMSAT micro-satellite

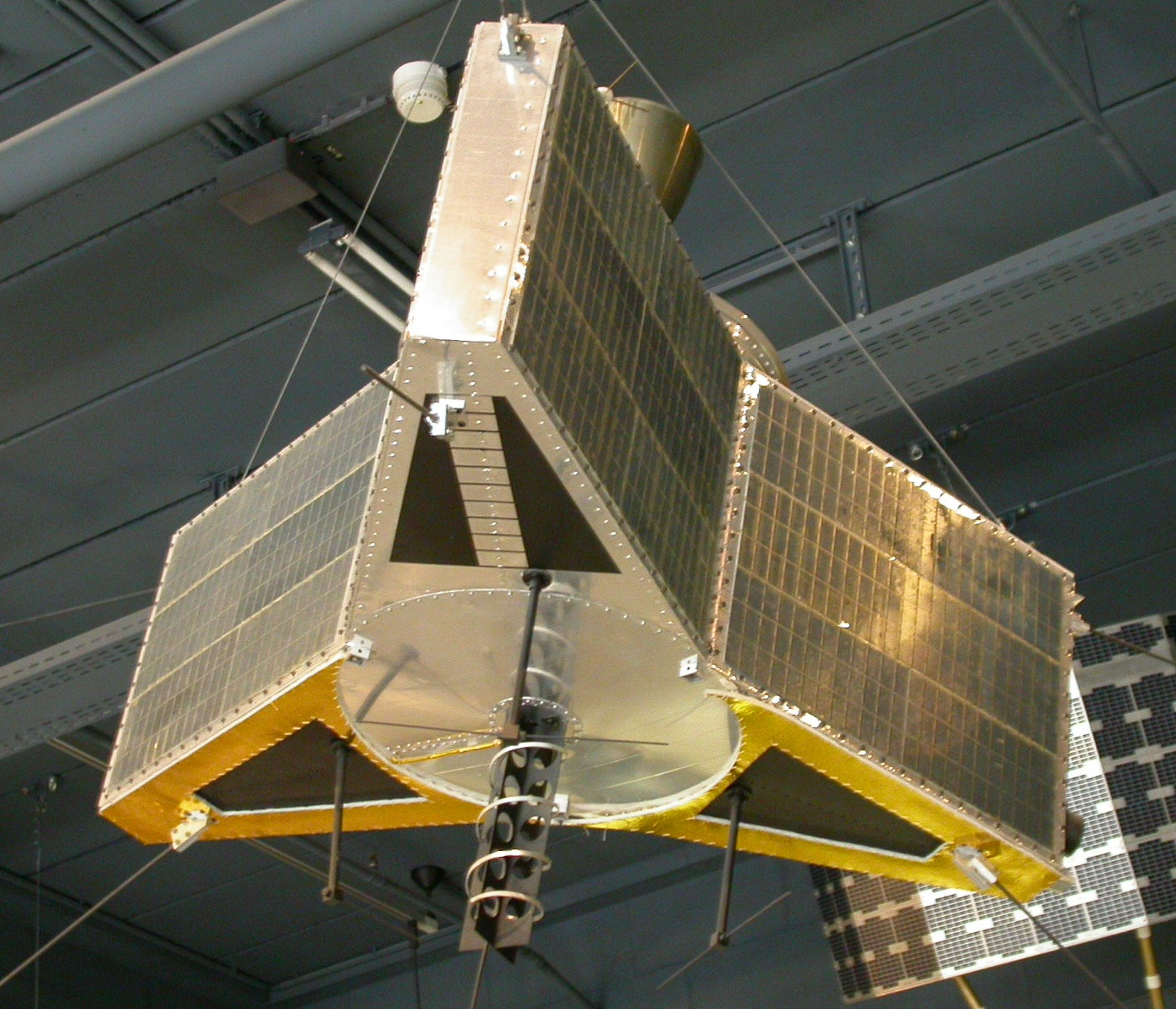
- COSPAR ID: 1983-058B
- SATCAT no.: 14129

Start of mission
- Launch date: 16 June 1983
- Launch site: Guiana Space Centre

AMSAT OSCAR 10 (or AO-10) was a star-shaped German AMSAT micro-satellite. It was launched on 16 June 1983 from Guiana Space Centre, Kourou, French Guiana, with an Ariane 1 rocket. This was changed to a Molniya orbit using an attached booster, to support world-wide amateur satellite communications.

== Specifications ==
- COSPAR ID: 1983-058B
- SATCAT: 14129
- Launch mass: 40 kg (88 lb)
- Perigee: 211 km (131 mi)
- Apogee: 35,503 km (22,061 mi)
- Inclination: 26.6°

== Fate ==
After three years in orbit its onboard computer began to malfunction due to radiation damage to its memory components. Nevertheless, the transponders continued to operate sporadically for almost 20 years.
