= Fox-1A =

American amateur radio satellite

- Mission type: Communications
- Operator: AMSAT
- COSPAR ID: 2015-058D
- SATCAT no.: 40967

Spacecraft properties
- Bus: CubeSat (1U)
- Manufacturer: Radio Amateur Satellite Corporation (AMSAT)
- Launch mass: 1.3 kilograms (2.9 lb)
- Dimensions: 10 by 10 by 10 centimetres (3.9 in × 3.9 in × 3.9 in)

Start of mission
- Launch date: 8 October 2015, 12:49 UTC
- Rocket: Atlas V 401 AV-058
- Launch site: Vandenberg SLC-3E

Orbital parameters
- Reference system: Geocentric
- Regime: Low Earth
- Semi-major axis: 7,020 kilometres (4,360 mi)
- Perigee altitude: 504.3 kilometres (313.4 mi)
- Apogee altitude: 795.7 kilometres (494.4 mi)
- Inclination: 64.8°
- Period: 97.6 minutes
- RAAN: 178.6841°
- Argument of perigee: 312.3881°
- Mean motion: 14.757262270
- Epoch: 25 June 2018

Transponders
- Band: FM
- Frequency: Uplink: 435.172 MHz; Downlink: 145.980 MHz
- TWTA power: 400mW

Fox-1A, AO-85 or AMSAT OSCAR 85 is an American amateur radio satellite. It is a 1U Cubesat, was built by the AMSAT-NA and carries a single-channel transponder for FM radio. The satellite has one rod antenna each for the 70 centimetres (28 in) and 2 metres (6 ft 7 in) bands. To enable a satellite launch under NASA's Educational Launch of Nanosatellites (ELaNa) program, the satellite continues to carry a Penn State University student experiment (MEMS gyroscope).

According to AMSAT-NA, Fox-1A will replace OSCAR 51. Upon successful launch, the satellite was assigned OSCAR number 85.

== Launch and mission ==
The satellite was launched on 8 October 2015 with an Atlas V rocket together with the main payload Intruder 11A (also known as NOSS-3 7A, USA 264 and NROL 55) and 12 other Cubesat satellites (SNaP-3 ALICE, SNaP-3 EDDIE, SNaP-3 JIMI, LMRSTSat, SINOD-D 1, SINOD-D 3, AeroCube 5C, OCSD A, ARC 1, BisonSat, PropCube 1 and PropCube 3) from Vandenberg Air Force Base, California, United States. After just a few hours, the transponder was put into operation, initial connections were made between amateur radio stations and telemetry was received.

Fox-1A (AO-85) Safe Mode Beacon

Fox-1A (AO-85) Transponder Mode Beacon

== Status ==
Since December 2018, AO-85 has suffered from dangerously low battery voltage while in eclipse. As a result, AMSAT have disabled all on board transmitters in an effort to extend the usable life of the satellite. Transmitters are periodically turned back on to collect telemetry data.

== See also ==
- OSCAR
