= LES-3 =

Former communications satellite

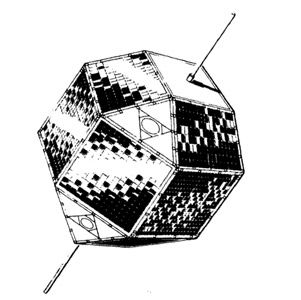
- Mission type: Communications satellite
- Operator: USAF
- COSPAR ID: 1965-108D
- SATCAT no.: 01941

Spacecraft properties
- Manufacturer: Lincoln Laboratory
- Launch mass: 16 kg (35 lb)

Start of mission
- Launch date: 21 December 1965, 14:00:01
- Rocket: Titan IIIC
- Launch site: Cape Canaveral LC41

End of mission
- Last contact: Late summer 1967
- Decay date: 6 April 1968

Orbital parameters
- Reference system: Geocentric
- Regime: Highly elliptical
- Eccentricity: 0.71486
- Perigee altitude: 195 km (121 mi)
- Apogee altitude: 33,177.00 km (20,615.23 mi)
- Inclination: 26.4°
- Period: 581.80 minutes
- Epoch: 21 December 1965 15:36:00

Lincoln Experimental Satellite 3, also known as LES-3, was a communications satellite, the third of nine in the Lincoln Experimental Satellite. Launched by the United States Air Force (USAF) on 21 Dec 1965, it was stranded in a Geostationary Transfer Orbit rather than its planned circular high orbit. Despite this, LES-3 returned good data on communications propagation in the UHF band.

== Background ==
After the successful development and deployment of Project West Ford, a passive communications system consisting of orbiting copper needles, MIT's Lincoln Laboratory turned to improving active-satellite space communications. In particular, Lincoln aimed to increase the transmission capability of communications satellites ("downlink"), which was necessarily constrained by their limited size. After receiving a charter in 1963 to build and demonstrate military space communications, Lincoln focused on a number of engineering solutions to the downlink problem including improved antennas, better stabilization of satellites in orbit (which would benefit both downlink and "uplink"—communications from the ground), high-efficiency systems of transmission modulation/de-modulation, and cutting-edge error-checking techniques.

These experimental solutions were deployed in a series of nine spacecraft called Lincoln Experimental Satellites (LES). Concurrent with their development, Lincoln also developed the Lincoln Experimental Terminals (LET), ground stations that used interference-resistant signaling techniques that allowed use of communications satellites by up to hundreds of users at a time, mobile or stationary, without involving elaborate systems for synchronization and centralized control.

The first experimental solution, demonstrated by LES-1, LES-2, and LES-4, involved communications in the "X-band", the military's SHF (super high frequency) band (225 to 400 MHz) because solid-state equipment allowed for comparatively high output in this band, and also because the band had been previously used by West Ford.

The SHF band was not usable for small, tactical deployment as it required large terminals and ground antennas. Lincoln Laboratories thus also explored using the UHF band for communications. After an initial survey program, in which aircraft were flown over cities and varied landscapes to measure ambient radio noise, LES-3 was developed specifically to explore propagation phenomena between satellites and airborne terminals. Because the Earth's surface was mirror-smooth relative to the one-meter wavelength of median UHF frequencies, transmissions could be sent from satellite to airborne terminals by multiple paths. By determining the likely parameters of signal delays, Lincoln engineers could create robust systems that accommodated for multipath propagation effects.

== Spacecraft design ==
LES-3 was produced quickly using technology from the three LES X-band satellites (-1, -2, and -4). Its primary function was simply to broadcast continuously at a frequency of 232.9 MHz.

Polyhedral in shape, and 5 ft (1.5 m) across, the solar powered satellite utilized the frame, power system, and power amplifiers designed for LES-1 and 2 and was similar in appearance to its predecessors. It differed in its omission of optical sensors, and the substitution of a UHF monopole antenna projecting from the top and bottom of the satellite's rectangular top and bottom for LES-1/2's X-band antennas. As a result, LES-3 massed just 16 kilograms (35 lb), about half of its predecessors.

The satellite was spin stabilized.

== Mission and results ==
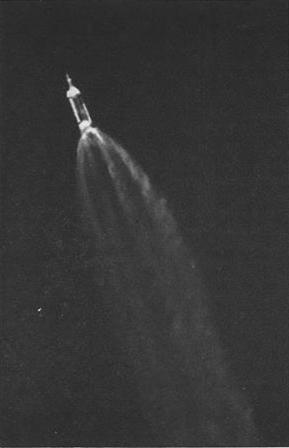
Titan 3C launch 22 Dec 1965

LES-3, along with LES-4, OV2-3, and OSCAR 4 was launched on the third Titan IIIC test flight on 22 December 1965 at 14:00:01 UT from Cape Canaveral LC41 just one second behind schedule. From an initial parking orbit of 194 kilometres (121 mi), the Titan's Transtage boosted into a transfer orbit pending a final burn to circularize its orbit. However, this final burn, scheduled for T+6:03:04 after liftoff, never occurred due to a leaking valve in the booster's attitude control system. LES-3, LES-4, and OSCAR 4 were released from the Transtage, albeit much later than intended; OV2-3 remained attached and did not operate.

Despite being placed in an unexpected orbit, spinning at 140 RPM inclined about 15° to the orbital plane (as opposed to perpendicularly, as had been planned), LES-3 functioned properly, providing signals necessary for UHF propagation measurements.

The satellite reentered on 6 April 1968, earlier than planned, but not before all desired testing had been successfully completed in late summer 1967.

== Legacy and status ==
The LES program continued through nine satellites, culminating in the launch of LES-8 and LES-9 on 14 March 1976.
