= OSCAR 4 =

Amateur radio satellite

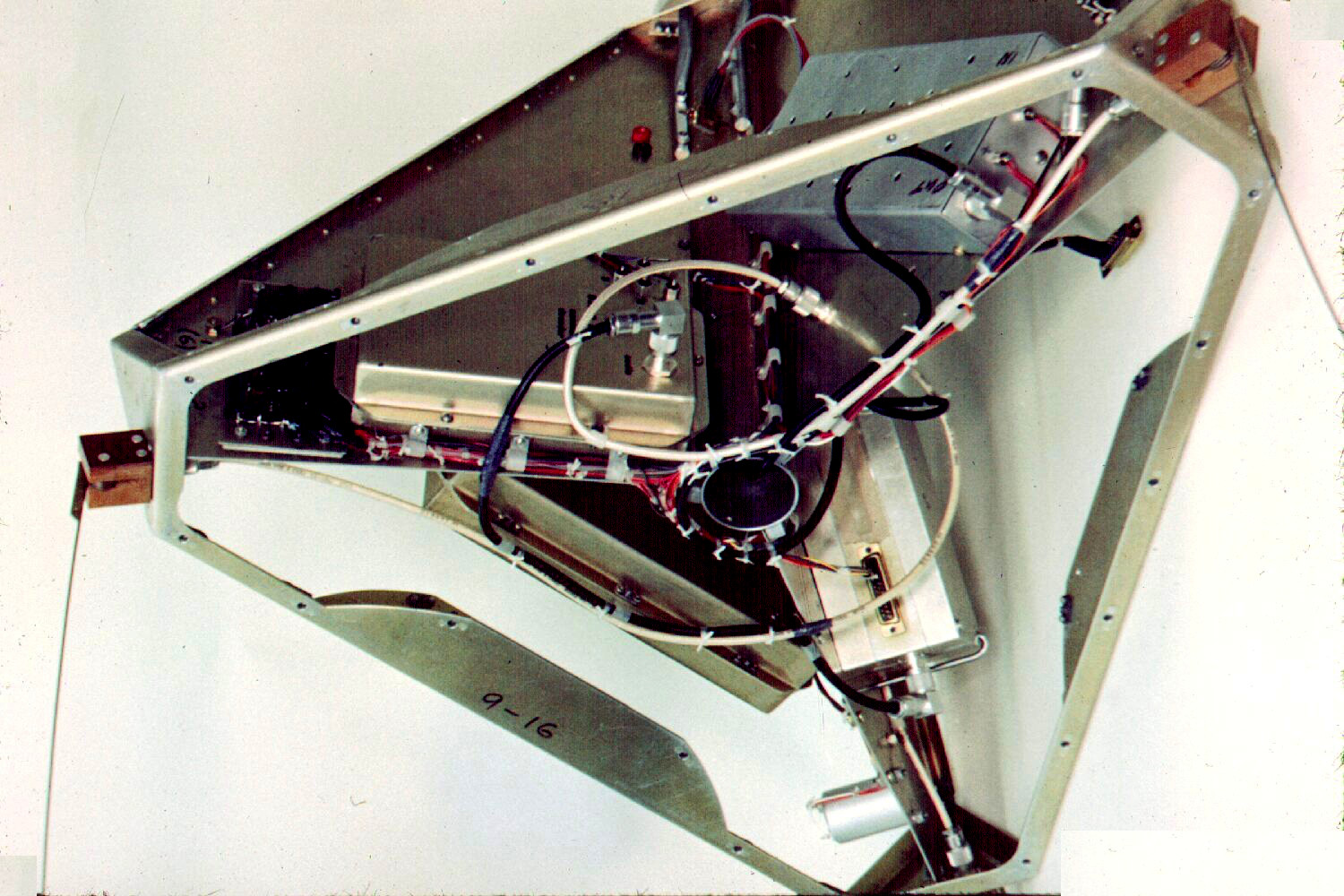
- OSCAR 4 with exterior panels removed
- Mission type: Communications
- Operator: Project OSCAR / DoD
- COSPAR ID: 1965-108C
- SATCAT no.: 01902

Spacecraft properties
- Launch mass: 18.1 kilograms (40 lb)

Start of mission
- Launch date: 21 December 1965
- Rocket: Titan IIIC 3C-8
- Launch site: Cape Canaveral LC-41

End of mission
- Decay date: 12 April 1976

Orbital parameters
- Reference system: Geocentric
- Regime: Geostationary (planned); Geostationary transfer orbit (actual)
- Eccentricity: 0.71843
- Perigee altitude: 162 kilometers (101 mi)
- Apogee altitude: 33,561 kilometers (20,854 mi)
- Inclination: 26.80 degrees
- Period: 587.4 minutes
- Epoch: 20 December 1965

OSCAR IV (a.k.a. OSCAR 4) was the fourth amateur radio satellite launched by Project OSCAR and the first targeted for Geostationary orbit on 12 December 1965. The satellite was launched piggyback with three United States Air Force satellites on a Titan IIIC launch vehicle. Due to a booster failure, OSCAR 4 was placed in an unplanned and largely unusable Geostationary transfer orbit.

== Project OSCAR ==
Project OSCAR Inc. was started in 1960 by members of the TRW Radio Club of Redondo Beach, California as well as persons associated with Foothill College to investigate the possibility of putting an amateur satellite in orbit. Project OSCAR was responsible for the construction of the first Amateur Radio Satellites: OSCAR 1, launched from Vandenberg AFB in California on 12 December 1961, which transmitted a “HI” greeting in Morse Code for three weeks, OSCAR 2, and OSCAR 3.

== Spacecraft ==
OSCAR 4 massed 15 kilograms (33 lb) and was a regular tetrahedron with edges 48 centimetres (19 in) long. It had four independent monopole antennae and contained a tracking beacon transmitter and a communications repeater. It was powered by a solar cell array and batteries. The satellite marked the first attempt for a High Earth Orbit (HEO) or GeoStationary Earth Orbit (GEO) amateur radio satellite, later categorized by AMSAT as Phase 3 and Phase 4. Improvements from prior OSCAR satellites included a higher power (3 Watt) 10 kHz wide linear transponder (144 MHz uplink and 432 MHz downlink), due to the higher planned orbit.

== Mission ==
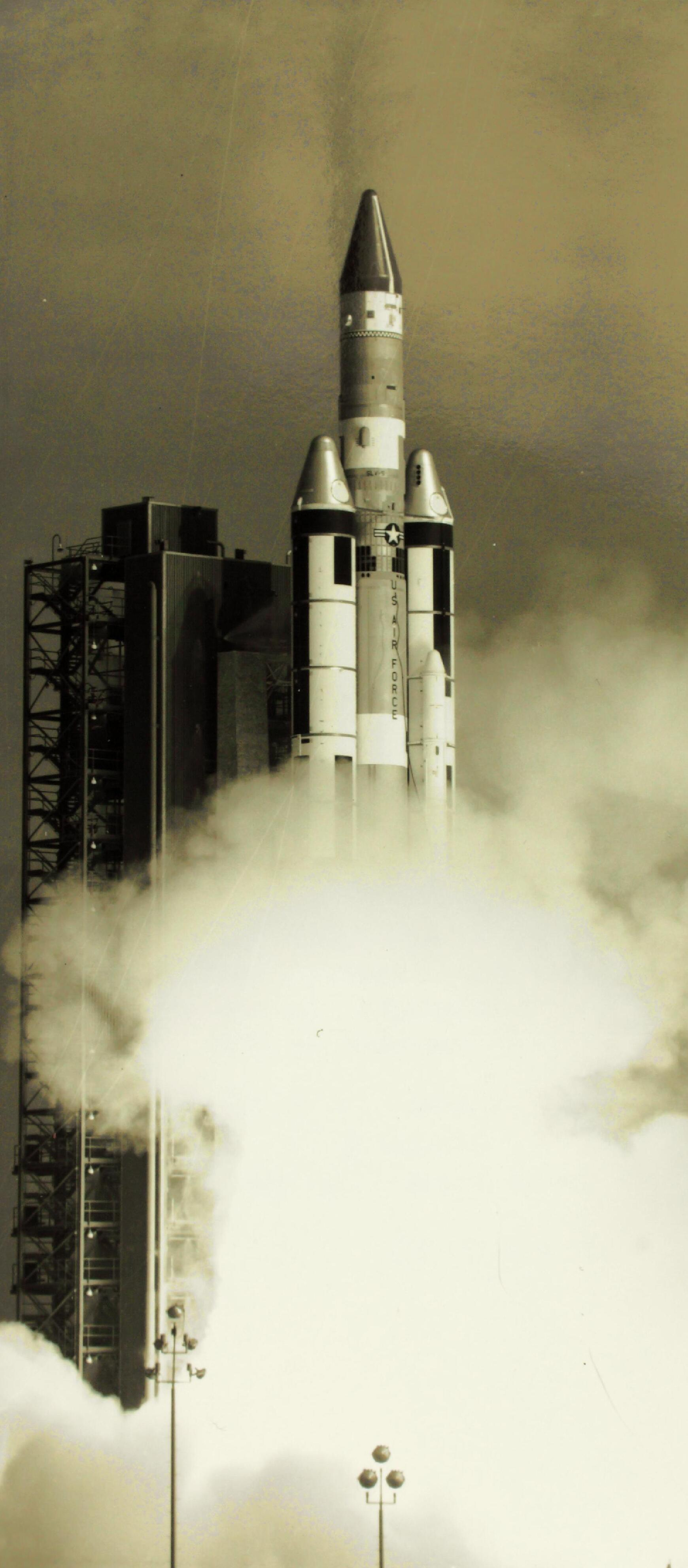
Titan 3C launch 22 Dec 1965

OSCAR 4, along with LES-3, LES-4, and OV2-3, was launched on the third Titan IIIC test flight on 22 December 1965 at 14:00:01 UT from Cape Canaveral LC41 just one second behind schedule. From an initial parking orbit of 194 kilometres (121 mi), the Titan's Transtage boosted into a transfer orbit pending a final burn to circularize its orbit. However, this final burn, scheduled for T+6:03:04 after liftoff, never occurred due to a leaking valve in the booster's attitude control system. OSCAR 4, LES-3 and LES-4, were released from the Transtage, albeit much later than intended, likely by the booster's backup timer; OV2-3 remained attached and did not operate.

The satellite remained in operation for 85 days, until 16 March 1966, and re-entered Earth's atmosphere on 12 April 1976.

== Legacy ==
In 1969, AMSAT-NA was founded by radio amateurs working at NASA's Goddard Space Flight Center and the Baltimore-Washington DC region, to continue the efforts begun by Project OSCAR. Its first project was to coordinate the launch of Australis-OSCAR 5, constructed by students at the University of Melbourne.
