= LES-2 =

Former communications satellite

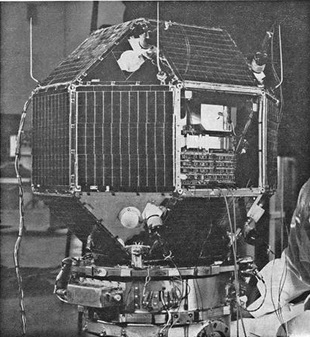
- LES-2 prior to launch
- Mission type: Communications satellite
- Operator: USAF
- COSPAR ID: 1965-034B
- SATCAT no.: 01360
- Mission duration: In Orbit: 59 years and 10 months

Spacecraft properties
- Manufacturer: Lincoln Laboratory
- Launch mass: 37 kg (82 lb)

Start of mission
- Launch date: 6 May 1965, 15:00:03 UTC
- Rocket: Titan IIIA
- Launch site: Cape Canaveral LC20

End of mission
- Last contact: 1967

Orbital parameters
- Reference system: Geocentric
- Regime: Low Earth
- Eccentricity: 0.39527
- Perigee altitude: 2,799 km (1,739 mi)
- Apogee altitude: 14,802 km (9,198 mi)
- Inclination: 32.2°
- Period: 309.90 minutes
- Epoch: 2 May 1965

Lincoln Experimental Satellite 2, also known as LES-2, was a communications satellite, the second of nine in the Lincoln Experimental Satellite. Launched by the United States Air Force (USAF) on 6 May 1965, it demonstrated many then-advanced technologies including active use of the military's SHF (super high frequency) band (7 to 8 GHz) to service hundreds of users.

== Background ==
After the successful development and deployment of Project West Ford, a passive communications system consisting of orbiting copper needles, MIT's Lincoln Laboratory turned to improving active-satellite space communications. In particular, Lincoln aimed to increase the transmission capability of communications satellites ("downlink"), which was necessarily constrained by their limited size. After receiving a charter in 1963 to build and demonstrate military space communications, Lincoln focused on a number of engineering solutions to the downlink problem including improved antennas, better stabilization of satellites in orbit (which would benefit both downlink and "uplink"—communications from the ground), high-efficiency systems of transmission modulation/de-modulation, and cutting-edge error-checking techniques.

These experimental solutions were deployed in a series of nine spacecraft called Lincoln Experimental Satellites (LES). Concurrent with their development, Lincoln also developed the Lincoln Experimental Terminals (LET), ground stations that used interference-resistant signaling techniques that allowed use of communications satellites by up to hundreds of users at a time, mobile or stationary, without involving elaborate systems for synchronization and centralized control.

The 1st, 2nd, and 4th satellites in the LES series were designated "X-Band satellites," designed to conduct experiments in the "X-band", the military's SHF (super high frequency) band (7 to 8 GHz) because solid-state equipment allowed for comparatively high output in this band, and also because the band had been previously used by West Ford.

LES-1, launched 11 February 1965, failed to depart from its original circular medium orbit when its onboard thruster failed to fire. The resultant tumbling and the improper orbit rendered the satellite useless for experimentation purposes.

== Spacecraft design ==
LES-2 was almost identical to LES-1. After the failure of LES-1, LES-2's ordnance circuitry, responsible for separating the satellite from its Titan carrier, was revised.

Polyhedral in shape, the 5 ft (1.5 m) spacecraft drew power from 2,376 solar cells, operating only in daylight. LES-1's primary experiments were a solid-state 0.1-watt transmitter, a multiple antenna system switched on by one of the satellite's four optical Earth sensors, and a magnetic coil attitude system.

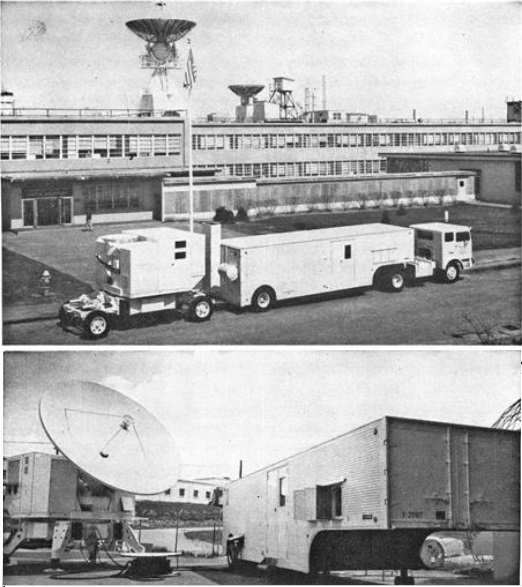
Lincoln Experimental Satellite ground communications equipment

== Mission and results ==
LES-2 was launched along with Lincoln Calibration Sphere (LCS) 1 from Cape Canaveral LC20 6 May 1965 at 15:00:03 UTC on a test flight of the Titan IIIA rocket. After three separate firings of the Titan's Transtage over the course of four hours, LES-2 fired its onboard rocket, injecting the satellite into is final orbit. LES-2 was used in a number of communications experiments and met all expected objectives. The satellite was automatically shut down by its internal clock in 1967.

== Legacy and status ==
The LES program continued through nine satellites, culminating in the launch of LES-8 and LES-9 on 14 March 1976.

As of 29 May 2020, LES-2 is still in orbit.
