= OSCAR 3 =

Amateur radio satellite

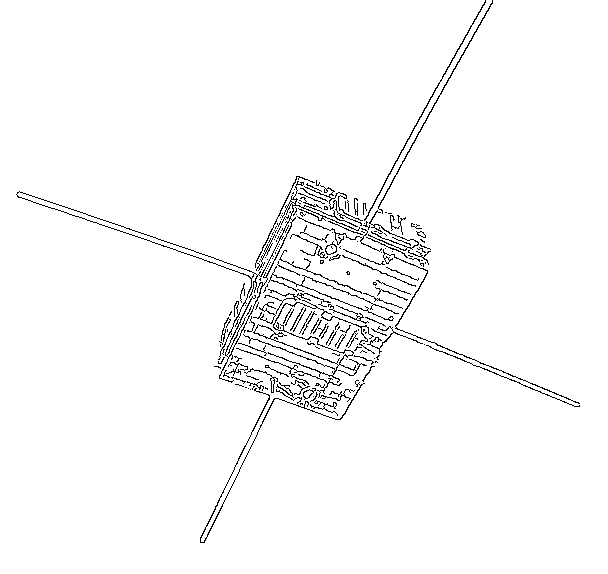
- Line drawing of OSCAR 3
- Mission type: Communications
- Operator: Project OSCAR
- COSPAR ID: 1965-016F
- SATCAT no.: 1293
- Mission duration: 16 days

Spacecraft properties
- Launch mass: 15 kilograms (33 lb)
- Dimensions: 7 in × 12 in × 7 in (18 cm × 30 cm × 18 cm)

Start of mission
- Launch date: 9 March 1965, 18:29:47 UTC
- Rocket: Thor SLV-2 Agena-D
- Launch site: LC-75-1-2

End of mission
- Disposal: Decommissioned
- Last contact: March 25, 1965

Orbital parameters
- Reference system: Geocentric
- Regime: Low Earth
- Eccentricity: 0.002
- Perigee altitude: 884 kilometers (549 mi)
- Apogee altitude: 917 kilometers (570 mi)pe
- Inclination: 70.1 degrees
- Period: 103.1 minutes
- Epoch: 9 March 1965

OSCAR 3 (a.k.a. OSCAR III) is the third amateur radio satellite launched by Project OSCAR into Low Earth Orbit. OSCAR 3 was launched March 9, 1965 by a Thor-DM21 Agena D launcher from Vandenberg Air Force Base, Lompoc, California. The satellite, massing 15 kg (33 lb), was launched piggyback with seven United States Air Force satellites. Though the satellite's active life was limited to sixteen days due to battery failure, OSCAR 3 relayed 176 messages from 98 stations in North America and Europe during its 274 orbit life-time -- the first amateur satellite to relay signals from Earth. As of 2026, it is still in orbit.

== Project OSCAR ==
Project OSCAR Inc. was started in 1960 by members of the TRW Radio Club of Redondo Beach, California as well as persons associated with Foothill College to investigate the possibility of putting an amateur satellite in orbit. Project OSCAR was responsible for the construction of the first Amateur Radio Satellites: OSCAR 1, launched from Vandenberg AFB in California on 12 December 1961, which transmitted a “HI” greeting in Morse Code for three weeks, the similar OSCAR 2, OSCAR 3, and OSCAR 4.

== Spacecraft ==
OSCAR 3 was a 15 kg (33 lb) rectangular-prism-shaped satellite, 7 in × 12 in × 17 in (18 cm × 30 cm × 43 cm) in dimension. Unlike its predecessors, which could only transmit a morse code "HI" signal through their beacons, OSCAR 3 was a true communications satellite. Equipped with a translator, when the satellite received signals broadcast to it at 144.1 MHz, its translator converted them to 30 MHz for amplification, and then reconverted them to 145.9 MHz for further amplification and retransmission. A watt of power was available for transmission; if more than one signal were received simultaneously, they shared the power in proportion to their signal strengths when received. OSCAR 3 also carried a beacon like OSCARs 1 and 2, though of lower power.

Four quarter-wave antennas (two for input/output to the translator, one for the beacon, and one for telemetry to the ground) were mounted on the sides of the lightweight magnesium-lithium alloy satellite. The hull was covered with shiny aluminum foil tape to reflect the heat of the Sun, and black stripes were painted over the shiny aluminum to radiate heat away from OSCAR 3 during the times it orbited in the shadow of the Earth. A large 18-volt battery powered the satellite, though the beacon was designed to continue functioning, supplied by power from solar cells and a rechargeable battery.

== Mission and results ==
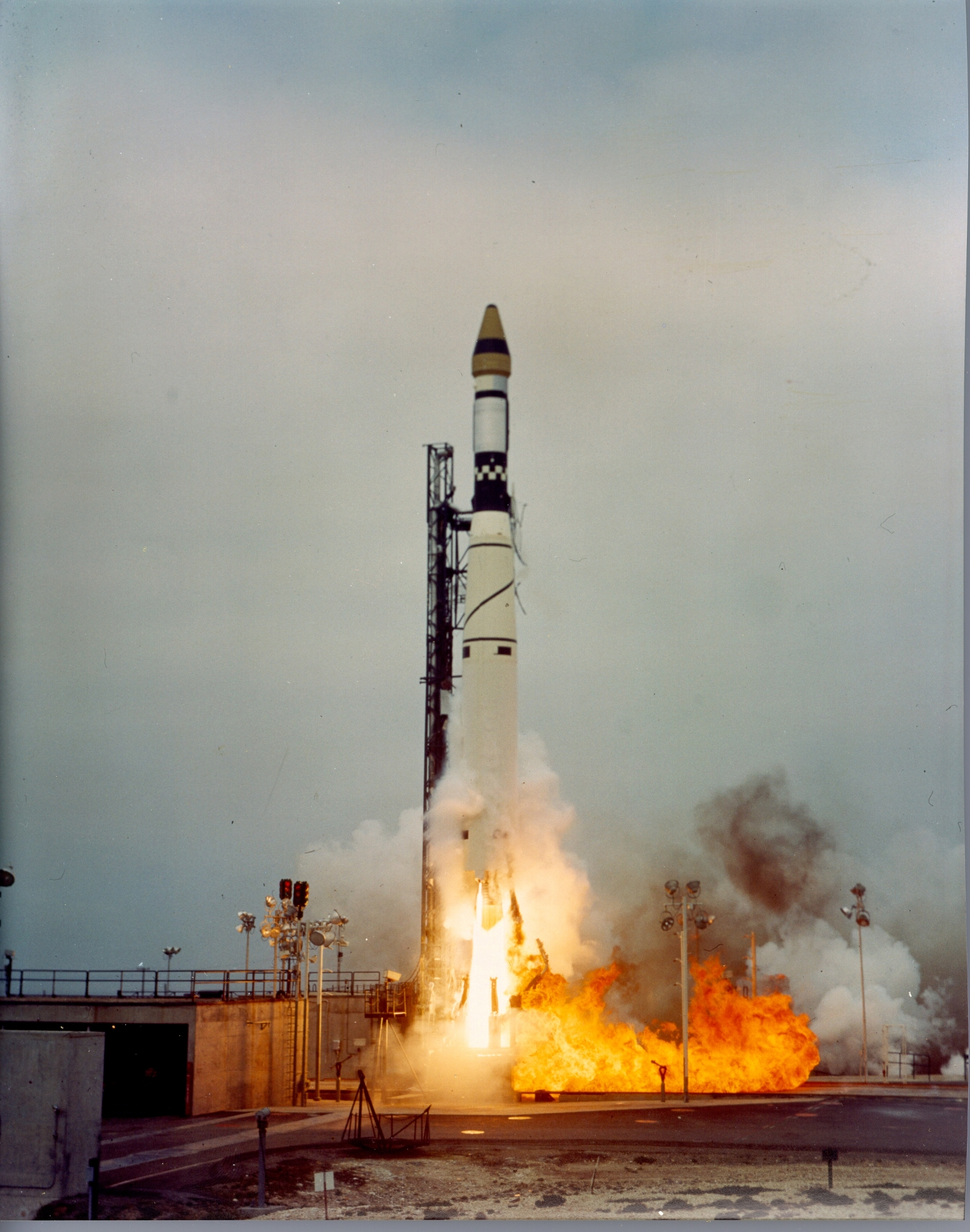
Launch of NRL Composite 5 carrying OSCAR 3

OSCAR 3 flew on the NRL Composite 5 mission, which lofted an unprecedented eight satellites on a single Thor Augmented Delta-Agena D rocket (including POPPY 4, an electronic signals intelligence (ELINT) surveillance package, GGSE-2, GGSE-3, Surcal 2B, SECOR 3, SOLRAD 7B, and Dodedcapole 1) on 9 March 1965 from Vandenberg Air Force Base Space Launch Complex 1, Pad 2.

Though the satellite's active life was limited to sixteen days due to battery failure, OSCAR 3 relayed 176 messages from 98 stations in North America and Europe during its 274 orbit life-time. The two beacon transmitters continued operating for several months. OSCAR 3 was thus the first amateur communications satellite to relay voice contacts in the VHF 2 meter band, the first amateur satellite to operate from solar power and relay signals from Earth, and the first satellite to use beacon transmitters separate from the main communications system.

As of 2023, OSCAR 3 is still in orbit, and its position can be tracked online.
