= Oscar I =

Oscar I may refer to:

- Oscar I of Sweden, king of Sweden and Norway
- Oscar I submarine, a class of Russian submarines
- OSCAR 1, the first amateur radio satellite
