= Oscar II (disambiguation) =

Oscar II was the King of Sweden and Norway.

Oscar II may also refer to:

- Oscar-class submarine, a series of nuclear-powered cruise missile submarines
- HSwMS Oscar II, a coastal defence ship
- OSCAR 2, an amateur radio satellite
- Oscar II, commonly known as the Peace Ship, used by Henry Ford in his 1915 peace mission
