= Zombie satellite =

Satellite that begins communicating again after an extended period of inactivity

A zombie satellite is a satellite that begins communicating again after an extended period of inactivity. It is a type of space debris, which describes all defunct human-made objects in outer space. At the end of their service life, the majority of satellites suffer from orbital decay and are destroyed by the heat of atmospheric entry. Zombie satellites, however, maintain a stable orbit but are either partially or completely inoperable, preventing operators from communicating with them consistently.

== History ==
=== Transit 5B-5 ===
One of the oldest known zombie satellites is Transit 5B-5. It was launched in 1965 as part of the Transit system, one of the first satellite navigation systems. Transit 5B-5 is solar powered and still in a stable polar orbit, though operators are unable to control it.

=== LES-1 ===
LES-1, also known as Lincoln Experimental Satellite 1, was a communications satellite launched by the United States Air Force on February 11, 1965, to study the use of Super High Frequency radio transmissions. It never achieved optimal orbit and was out of contact for more than 40 years before spontaneously resuming transmissions in 2012.

=== AMSAT-OSCAR 7 ===
AMSAT-OSCAR 7 is an amateur-radio communications satellite which was launched into Low Earth Orbit on November 15, 1974, and remained operational until a battery failure in 1981. Then after 21 years of apparent silence, the satellite was heard again on June 21, 2002 – 27 years after launch.

=== Galaxy 15 ===
Galaxy 15 is a U.S. telecommunications satellite launched in 2005. In April 2010, only five years into a planned 15-year mission, its operator, Intelsat, lost control of the satellite and it drifted out of its orbital slot. Several months later, on December 27, 2010, the satellite rebooted itself and began responding to commands again. Intelsat re-positioned it back to its original orbital slot in April 2011.

=== IMAGE ===
Launched in 2000, IMAGE (Imager for Magnetopause-to-Aurora Global Exploration), a NASA spacecraft studying the Earth's magnetosphere, unexpectedly ceased operations in December 2005. It was a zombie satellite until Scott Tilley, an amateur radio operator living in Canada, tracked it down in January 2018. On February 25, contact with IMAGE was again lost. It was reestablished in March but lost again in August. NASA is currently evaluating a recovery mission.

=== LES-5 ===
On March 24, 2020, contact with another lost Lincoln Experimental Satellite, LES-5, was made by Scott Tilley, who had previously regained contact with IMAGE. The satellite is only in operation when its solar panels are receiving sunlight.

== See also ==
- Space debris
- Skylab 4
- Space Liability Convention
- List of spaceflight-related accidents and incidents
- Laser broom
- Kessler syndrome
