= LES-4 =

Former communications satellite

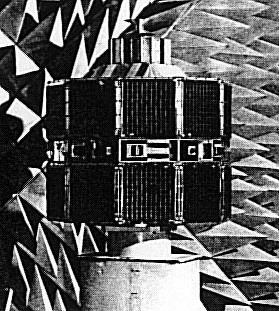
- LES-4
- Mission type: Communications satellite
- Operator: USAF
- COSPAR ID: 1965-108B
- SATCAT no.: 01870

Spacecraft properties
- Manufacturer: Lincoln Laboratory
- Launch mass: 52 kg (115 lb)

Start of mission
- Launch date: 21 December 1965, 14:00:01
- Rocket: Titan IIIC
- Launch site: Cape Canaveral LC41

End of mission
- Last contact: October 1968
- Decay date: 1 Aug 1977

Orbital parameters
- Reference system: Geocentric
- Regime: Highly eccentric
- Eccentricity: 0.71786
- Perigee altitude: 189.00 km (117.44 mi)
- Apogee altitude: 33,632.00 km (20,897.96 mi)
- Inclination: 26.600°
- Period: 589.20 minutes
- Epoch: 21 December 1965 15:36:00

Lincoln Experimental Satellite 4, also known as LES-4, was a communications satellite, the fourth of nine in the Lincoln Experimental Satellite, and the first of the series designed for operations at geosynchronous altitudes. Launched by the United States Air Force (USAF) on 21 December 1965, it demonstrated many then-advanced technologies including active use of the military's SHF (super high frequency) band (7 to 8 GHz) to service hundreds of users.

== Background ==
After the successful development and deployment of Project West Ford, a passive communications system consisting of orbiting copper needles, MIT's Lincoln Laboratory turned to improving active-satellite space communications. In particular, Lincoln aimed to increase the transmission capability of communications satellites ("downlink"), which was necessarily constrained by their limited size. After receiving a charter in 1963 to build and demonstrate military space communications, Lincoln focused on a number of engineering solutions to the downlink problem including improved antennas, better stabilization of satellites in orbit (which would benefit both downlink and "uplink"—communications from the ground), high-efficiency systems of transmission modulation/de-modulation, and cutting-edge error-checking techniques.

These experimental solutions were deployed in a series of nine spacecraft called Lincoln Experimental Satellites (LES). Concurrent with their development, Lincoln also developed the Lincoln Experimental Terminals (LET), ground stations that used interference-resistant signaling techniques that allowed use of communications satellites by up to hundreds of users at a time, mobile or stationary, without involving elaborate systems for synchronization and centralized control.

The 1st, 2nd, and 4th satellites in the LES series were designated "X-Band satellites," designed to conduct experiments in the "X-band", the military's SHF (super high frequency) band (7 to 8 GHz) because solid-state equipment allowed for comparatively high output in this band, and also because the band had been previously used by West Ford.

LES-1, launched 11 February 1965, failed to depart from its original circular medium orbit when its onboard thruster failed to fire. The resultant tumbling and the improper orbit rendered the satellite useless for experimentation purposes. LES-2, launched 6 May 1965 was used in a number of communications experiments and met all expected objectives. The satellite was automatically shut down by its internal clock in 1967.

With medium orbit experiments complete, the experimenters then focused on conducting X-band experiments from geosynchronous orbit

== Spacecraft design ==
LES-4 was an evolution of the LES-1/2 design for a much higher orbit. It carried more solar cells to run a more powerful transmitter and a greater number of Sun and Earth sensors. In addition, LES-4 was equipped with an electron spectrometer to measure radiation in orbit in the 130 KeV to 4 MeV range, both for scientific purposes and to correlate the effect of radiation from the intense Van Allen Belts on spacecraft functions. The satellite was spin stabilized, designed to rotate perpendicular to its orbital plane.

== Mission and results ==
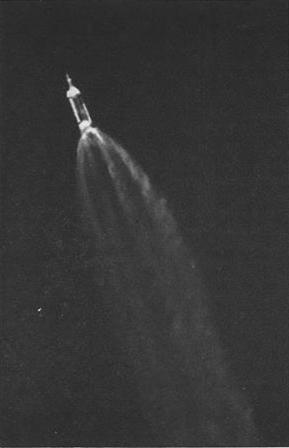
Titan 3C launch 22 Dec 1965

LES-4, along with LES-3, OV2-3, and OSCAR 4 was launched on the third Titan IIIC test flight on 22 December 1965 at 14:00:01 UT from Cape Canaveral LC41 just one second behind schedule. From an initial parking orbit of 194 kilometres (121 mi), the Titan's Transtage boosted into a transfer orbit pending a final burn to circularize its orbit. However, this final burn, scheduled for T+6:03:04 after liftoff, never occurred due to a leaking valve in the booster's attitude control system. LES-3, LES-4, and OSCAR 4 were released from the Transtage, albeit much later than intended; OV2-3 remained attached and did not operate.

Stranded in an unintended orbit, and misaligned with the sun, the satellite's solar panels only produced enough power to run onboard telemetry. Before the New Year, however, the spin axis of the satellite had precessed enough for the panels to provide sufficient power for all systems. Due to the improper orbit, the magnetic spin axis orientation system, as well as one of the onboard antenna switching control systems were rendered inoperable. The other antenna switching control system did operate properly, and all communications and scientific objectives were met.

LES-4 stopped transmitting in October 1968. The satellite reentered the Earth's atmosphere on 1 August 1977.

== Legacy and status ==
The LES program continued through nine satellites, culminating in the launch of LES-8 and LES-9 on 14 March 1976.
