= Lincoln Calibration Sphere 1 =

Radar calibration satellite

- Names: LCS-1
- Mission type: Radar calibration
- Operator: MIT Lincoln Laboratory
- COSPAR ID: 1965-034C
- SATCAT no.: 01361
- Mission duration: Elapsed: 61 years, 4 months and 4 days

Spacecraft properties
- Spacecraft: LCS-1
- Spacecraft type: Aluminium sphere
- Manufacturer: Rohr Corp.
- Dry mass: 34 kg (75 lb)

Start of mission
- Launch date: May 6, 1965, 15:00:03 UTC
- Rocket: Titan IIIA
- Launch site: Cape Canaveral LC-20
- Contractor: US Department of Defense
- Deployed from: Geocentric orbit
- Deployment date: 06 May 1965

End of mission
- Disposal: Re-Entry
- Decay date: In c. 30,000 years

Orbital parameters
- Reference system: Geocentric
- Regime: Medium Earth
- Eccentricity: 0.00055
- Perigee altitude: 2,786 km (1,731 mi)
- Apogee altitude: 2,796 km (1,737 mi)
- Inclination: 32.1°
- Period: 145.6 minutes
- RAAN: 1 hour 35 minutes
- Epoch: May 5, 1965

The Lincoln Calibration Sphere 1, or LCS-1, is a large aluminium sphere in Earth orbit since 6 May 1965. It is still in use, having lasted for over 60 years. The sphere was launched along with the Lincoln Experimental Satellite-2 on a Titan IIIA. It is technically the oldest operational spacecraft (Note: The title of "oldest operational spacecraft" can be disputed; for example, Vanguard 1 is an older satellite that is still "operating" as passive atmospheric measurement probe (it can and time-to-time is tracked from the Earth's surface using optical/radar means to study changes in its orbit), although it can be said that Vanguard 1 no longer operates as it was intended to, as it used to be an active satellite and now is a derelict object in orbit. However, there are other satellites that are still actively used and that were also initially intended to be just passive satellites to be followed from the ground by optical or radar means to study changes in their orbit (and thus the very high altitude atmosphere), like Calsphere 1 and 2 (COSPAR 1964-063C, 1964-063E respectively). So LCS-1's claim of being "oldest operational spacecraft" is dubious.), but it has no power supply or fuel; it is merely a passive metal sphere. LCS-1 has been used for radar calibration since its launch. It was built by Rohr. Corp. for the MIT Lincoln Laboratory.

LCS-1 is a hollow sphere 1.12 m (3 ft 8 in) in diameter with a wall thickness of 3.2 mm (0.13 in). The sphere was constructed from two hemispheres, made by spinning sheet metal over a mold. These hemispheres were fastened to an internal, circumferential hoop by 440 countersunk screws, then milled and polished. The initial finish had a surface roughness less than 10 micrometres and was expected to last for five years. Since its launch, I-band measurements have shown periodic deviations that likely correspond to one or more new surface irregularities.

Before being launched to orbit, the optical cross section of the LCS-1 was measured in L, S, C, X and K microwave bands. Four other spheres were also manufactured and measured for comparison to the one in orbit.
