= Radar calibration satellite =

Satellite used to calibrate space radars

Radar calibration satellites are orbital satellites used to calibrate ground-based space surveillance radars. There are two types: active and passive.

== Passive satellites ==
Passive calibration satellites are objects of known shape and size. Examples include the Lincoln Calibration Sphere 1 developed by the MIT Lincoln Laboratory. These are generally solid or hollow spheres, since that shape will have the same cross-section regardless of viewing angle, though later passive satellites used wire grid designs. A ground radar calculates the satellite's position using knowledge of the satellite's radar cross section, and this is compared with the satellite's known position and velocity.

== Active satellites ==
Active calibration satellites are equipped with transponders that emit a signal on command. The ground radar station submits a transmit command and takes a measurement of the satellite's location. The transponder's signal is received by a radar receiver and combined with the satellite's ephemeris data to calculate the satellite's actual position, and this is then compared with the position calculated by the radar measurement in order to measure the radar's accuracy. Examples include the SURCAL series developed by the Naval Research Laboratory, RADCAL and Soviet DS-P1-Yu series.
