= IMAGE (spacecraft) =

NASA satellite of the Explorer program

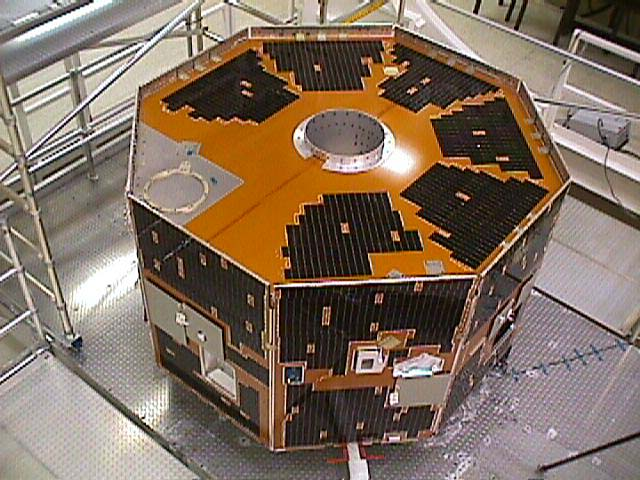
- IMAGE (Explorer 78) satellite in preparation
- Names: Explorer 78; MIDEX-1; Imager for Magnetopause-to-Aurora Global Exploration
- Mission type: Magnetosphere research
- Operator: NASA / Goddard; Applied Physics Laboratory
- COSPAR ID: 2000-017A
- SATCAT no.: 26113
- Website: pluto.space.swri.edu/IMAGE/ image.gsfc.nasa.gov
- Mission duration: 2 years (planned); 26 years, 4 months, 1 day (in orbit)

Spacecraft properties
- Spacecraft: Explorer LXXVIII
- Spacecraft type: Imager for Magnetopause-to-Aurora Global Exploration
- Bus: IMAGE
- Manufacturer: Lockheed Martin Missiles and Space Corporation
- Launch mass: 494 kg (1,089 lb)
- Dimensions: 225 × 152 cm (89 × 60 in)
- Power: 286 watts

Start of mission
- Launch date: 25 March 2000, 20:34:43.929 UTC
- Rocket: Delta II 7326-9.5 (Delta 277)
- Launch site: Vandenberg, SLC-2W
- Contractor: Boeing Launch Services

End of mission
- Deactivated: 18 December 2005
- Last contact: 4 March 2018

Orbital parameters
- Reference system: Geocentric orbit
- Regime: Polar orbit
- Perigee altitude: 1,000 km (620 mi)
- Apogee altitude: 46,004 km (28,586 mi)
- Inclination: 90.01°
- Period: 856.00 minutes
Instruments
- RPI: Radio Plasma Imager
- LENA: Low-Energy Neutral Atom Imager
- MENA: Medium-Energy Neutral Atom Imager
- HENA: High-Energy Neutral Atom Imager
- FUV: Far Ultraviolet Imager
- EUV: Extreme Ultraviolet Imager
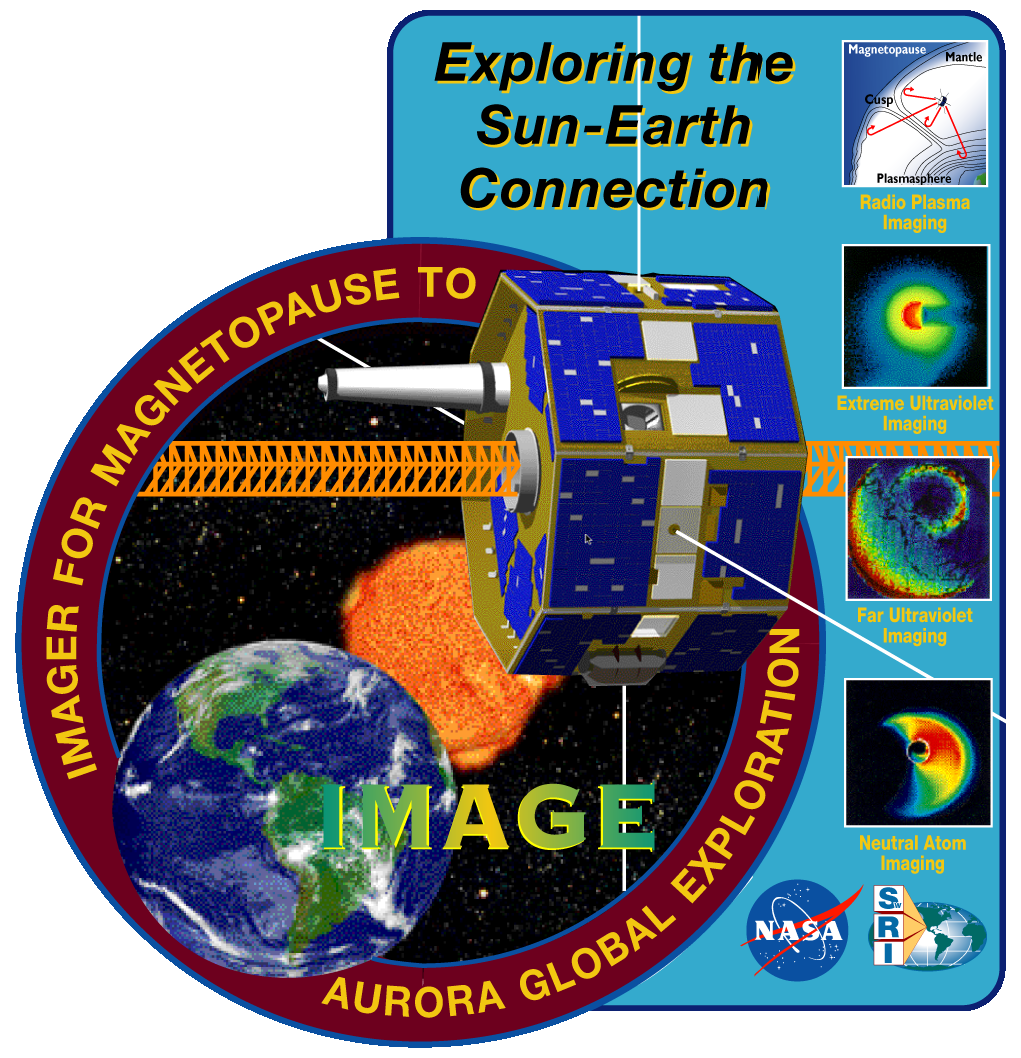
- IMAGE mission patch Explorer program

IMAGE (Imager for Magnetopause-to-Aurora Global Exploration, Explorer 78 or MIDEX-1) was a NASA Medium Explorer mission that studied the global response of the Earth's magnetosphere to changes in the solar wind. It was believed lost but as of August 2018 might be recoverable. It was launched 25 March 2000, at 20:34:43.929 UTC, by a Delta II launch vehicle from Vandenberg Air Force Base on a two-year mission. Almost six years later, it unexpectedly ceased operations in December 2005 during its extended mission and was declared lost. The spacecraft was part of NASA's Sun-Earth Connections Program, and its data has been used in over 400 research articles published in peer-reviewed journals. It had special cameras that provided various breakthroughs in understanding the dynamics of plasma around the Earth. The principal investigator was Jim Burch of the Southwest Research Institute.

In January 2018, an amateur satellite tracker found it to be transmitting some signals back to Earth. NASA made attempts to communicate with the spacecraft and determine its payload status, but has had to track down and adapt old hardware and software to the current systems. On 25 February 2018, contact with IMAGE was again lost only to be reestablished on 4 March 2018. The signal disappeared once again on 5 August 2018. If recovery efforts succeed, NASA may decide to fund a restarted mission.

== Overview ==
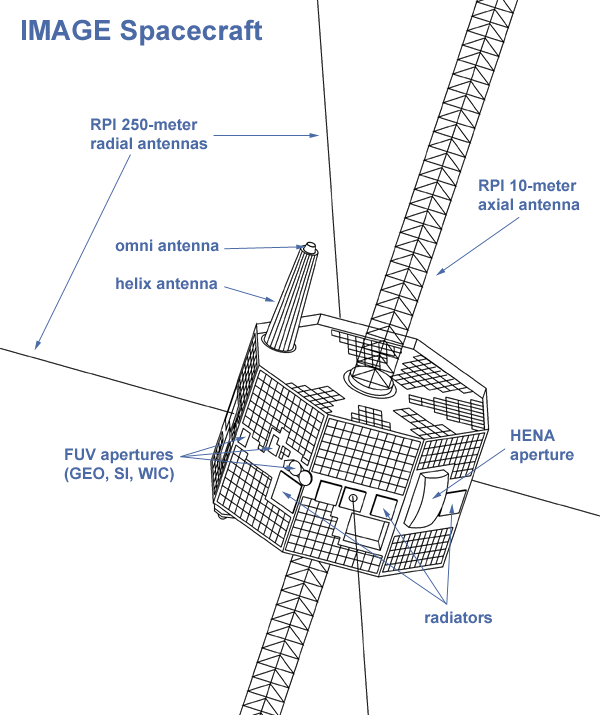
Diagram of IMAGE spacecraft

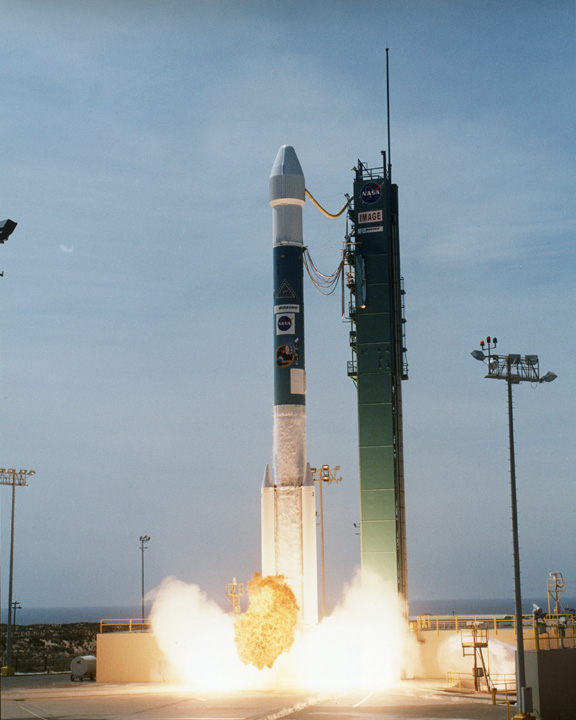
Launch of IMAGE spacecraft aboard of Delta 277.

IMAGE was the first spacecraft dedicated to imaging the Earth's magnetosphere. IMAGE was a spacecraft developed by the Medium-class Explorer (MIDEX) program, and it was the first spacecraft dedicated to observing the magnetosphere of the Earth, producing comprehensive global images of plasma in the inner magnetosphere. The IMAGE craft was placed in a 1,000 km (620 mi) × 46,004 km (28,586 mi) orbit around the Earth, with an inclination of 90.01° (passing over the poles) and a 14.2 hour period.

By acquiring images every 2 minutes in wavelengths invisible to the human eye, it allowed detailed study of the interaction of the solar wind with the magnetosphere and the magnetosphere's response during a magnetic storm. From its distant orbit, the spacecraft produced a wealth of images of the previously invisible region of space in the inner magnetosphere, exceeded all its scientific goals. A senior review in 2005, just previous to its loss, described the mission as "extremely productive", having confirmed several theoretical predictions (e.g. plasmasphere plumes, pre-midnight ring-current injection, and continuous antiparallel reconnection), discovered numerous new and unanticipated phenomena (e.g. plasmasphere shoulders, subauroral proton arcs, and a secondary interstellar neutral atom stream), and answered a set of outstanding questions regarding the source region of kilometric continuum radiation, the role of solar wind pressure pulses in ionospheric outflow, and the relationship between proton and electron auroras during substorms. When the spacecraft went silent in December 2005, it had already been approved for a mission extension until 2010.

Costs for IMAGE are estimated at US$132 million, including the spacecraft, instruments, launch vehicle, and ground operations.

== Payload ==
Its science payload consists of three suites of instruments:

- Energetic neutral atom imagers (LENA, MENA, HENA) — These instruments use hydrogen, helium, and oxygen atoms in the exosphere to form images and determine the properties of their low-, medium- and high-energy parent ions. HENA, the High Energy Neutral Atom imager is a modified version of the MIMI/INCA (Magnetospheric Imaging Instrument/Ion and Neutral Camera) sensor flown on the Cassini–Huygens mission.
- Ultraviolet imagers (FUV and EUV) — The extreme ultraviolet (EUV) imager detects light from helium atoms in Earth's plasmasphere. The Far ultraviolet (FUV) imager employs three detectors to image the auroras in different wavelengths and measure the distribution of different ions.
- Radio Plasma Imager (RPI) — This instrument uses pulses of radio waves to image the entire volume of the Earth's magnetic field. With its 502 m (1,647 ft)-long antenna, it sends out a burst of radio waves, which reflect off of clouds of charged particles between the plasmasphere's outer boundary all the way out to the boundary where the Earth's magnetic field is impacted by the solar wind. RPI also measures naturally occurring plasma waves at the spacecraft's location.

The Central Instrument Data Processor (CIDP) as well as the Command & Data Handling Subsystem (main on-board computer) were built around the mission-proven IBM RAD6000 avionics processors.

== Experiments ==
=== Extreme Ultraviolet Imager (EUV) ===
The Extreme Ultraviolet Imager (EUV) of the IMAGE mission observes the distribution of He+ in Earth's plasmasphere by detecting its resonantly-scattered emission at 30.4-nm. It records the structure and dynamics of the cold plasma in Earth's plasmasphere on a global scale. The 30.4-nm feature is relatively easy to measure because it is the brightest ion emission from the plasmasphere, it is spectrally isolated, and the background at that wavelength is negligible. Measurements are easy to interpret because the plasmaspheric He+ emission is optically thin, so its brightness is directly proportional to the He+ column abundance. Effective imaging of the plasmaspheric He+ requires global "snapshops" in which the high apogee and the wide field of view of EUV provide in a single exposure a map of the entire plasmasphere. EUV consists of three identical sensor heads, each having a field of view of 30° in diameter. These sensors are tilted relative to one another to cover a fan-shaped field of 84° by 30°, which is swept across the plasmasphere by the spin of the satellite. EUV's spatial resolution is 0.6° of 0.1 R_{E} in the equatorial plane seen from apogee. The sensitivity is 1.9 count/second-rayleigh, sufficient to map the position of the plasmapause with a time resolution of 10 minutes.

=== Far Ultraviolet Imager (FUV) ===
The IMAGE satellite instrument complement includes three Far Ultraviolet (FUV) instruments. In the wavelength region 120-190 nm, a downward-viewing auroral imager is only minimally contaminated by sunlight, scattered from clouds and ground, and radiance of the aurora observed in a nadir viewing geometry can be observed in the presence of the high-latitude dayglow. The Wideband Imaging Camera (WIC) provides broadband ultraviolet images of the aurora for maximum spatial and temporal resolution by imaging the LBH N2 bands of the aurora. The Spectrographic Imager (SI), a monochromatic imager, images different types of aurora, filtered by wavelength. By measuring the Doppler-shifted Lyman-a, the proton-induced component of the aurora can be imaged separately. Finally, the GEO instrument observes the distribution of the geocoronal emission, which is a measure of the neutral background density source for charge exchange in the magnetosphere. The FUV instrument complement looks radially outward from the rotating IMAGE satellite and, therefore, it spends only a short time observing the aurora and the Earth during each spin (120-seconds period). Detailed descriptions of the WIC, SI, GEO, and their individual performance validations can be found in the January 2000 issue of the Space Science Reviews. One primary requirement of the FUV instrument is to maximize photon collection efficiency and use efficiently the short time available for exposures. The FUV auroral imagers WIC and SI both have wide fields of view and take data continuously as the auroral region proceeds through the field of view. To minimize data volume, multiple images are taken and electronically co-added by suitably shifting each image to compensate for the spacecraft rotation. In order to minimize resolution loss, the images have to be distortion -corrected in real time for both WIC and SI prior to co-adding. The distortion correction is using high speed look up tables that are pre-generated by least square fitting to polynomial functions by the on-orbit processor. The instruments were calibrated individually while on stationery platforms, mostly in vacuum chambers as described in the companion papers. Extensive ground-based testing was performed with visible and near UV simulators mounted on a rotating platform to estimate their on-orbit performance.

=== High-Energy Neutral Atom Imager (HENA) ===
The High-Energy Neutral Atom (HENA) imager on IMAGE is one of three instruments designed to make observations of the Earth's magnetospheric environment using neutral atom imaging. The HENA instrument determines the velocity, trajectory, energy, and mass of ENAs in the 10-500 keV energy range and from these data generates images of ENA source regions in the inner magnetosphere. The two main HENA components are the sensor and the main electronics unit (MEU). The HENA sensor consists of alternately charged deflection plates mounted in a fan configuration in front of the entrance slit, three Microchannel plate detectors (MCP), a solid-state detector (SSD), two carbon-silicon-polyimide foils (one at the entrance slit, the other placed just in front of the back MCP), and a series of wires and electrodes to steer secondary electrons ejected from the foils (or the SSD) to the MCPs. Power for the MCPs and deflection plates and for secondary electron steering is provided by high-voltage power supplies that reside with the sensor. The MEU contains HENA's data processing unit (DPU), the analog electronics (which amplifies and processes signals from the sensor and performs housekeeping monitoring), analog-to-digital converters, and a low-voltage power supply.

HENA determines the velocity of the ENAs that it detects by measuring their time of flight (ToF) and trajectory through the sensor (from the entrance slit either to the back foil and two-dimensional imaging MCP detector or to the SSD. When an incoming ENA passes through the entrance foil, it produces secondary electrons, which are accelerated and steered to the front imaging MCP. This MCP, the "start" MCP, provides a start signal for the TOF analysis and registers the position at which the ENA penetrated the entrance slit. The ENA then continues through the sensor to the backplane and strikes either the foil in front of the 2-D imaging MCP or the SSD. In the first case, secondary electrons ejected from the back foil trigger a stop pulse in the 2-D imaging MCP, which also registers the position of the incident ENA. If the ENA strikes the SSD instead, the secondary electrons ejected by the impact are steered to the "coincidence" MCP, which provides the TOF stop signal; the position of impact is registered by the SSD. The start and stop signals are processed by the analog ToF electronics in the MEU and digitized for input into the DPU. The start and stop pulses give the ENA's time of flight, while the position measurements reveal its trajectory and thus its path length within the sensor. With these two pieces of information, time of flight and path length, HENA can calculate the ENA's velocity. The energy of the incident ENAs is measured with the SSD. When an ENA strikes the SSD, it generates a current pulse. The amplitude of this pulse (the pulse height) is directly proportional to the amount of energy that the ENA deposits in the SSD crystal. Thus, by analyzing the pulse height, HENA can determine the energy of an ENA incident on the SSD. And as mass is equal to the twice the energy divided by the velocity squared, once the energy and velocity of the ENA have been determined, its mass can be calculated. Calculating mass from the velocity and the SSD energy measurement is the primary technique used by HENA to determine composition of the ENAs. A second technique uses the pulse height of the MCP signal to distinguish between oxygen and hydrogen, the two most common neutral atoms expected in the magnetosphere.

=== Low-Energy Neutral Atom Imager (LENA) ===
The Low-Energy Neutral Atom (LENA) imager on IMAGE is one of three instruments designed to make observations of the Earth's magnetospheric environment using neutral atom imaging. The objectives of LENA are to: (1) measure neutrals without interference from electrons, ions or UV; (2) distinguish neutral protons from oxygen; (3) determine ion outflow on five minute time scales over broad range of local times; and, (4) measure energies as low as 10 eV with high counting statistics. The LENA instrument consists of a collimator, conversion unit, extraction lens, dispersive energy analyzer and time-of-flight mass analyzer with position-sensitive particle detection. Neutral particles enter the instrument through a collimator which filters charged particles. LENA converts neutrals to negative ions through a near specular glancing reflection from a tungsten surface. Negative ions from the surface are then collected by an extraction lens which focuses all negative ions with the same energy to a fixed location. In the extraction lens, the ions are accelerated by 20 kV prior to entering the electrostatic analyzer. Finally, the ions pass into a time-of-flight/position sensing section where ion mass, energy, and angle are determined.

=== Medium-Energy Neutral Atom Imager (MENA) ===
The Medium-Energy Neutral Atom (MENA) imager on IMAGE is one of three instruments designed to make observations of the Earth's magnetospheric environment using neutral atom imaging. MENA is a slit-type imager designed to detect energetic neutral hydrogen and oxygen atoms with energies ranging from 1 to 30 keV. The instrument determines the time of flight and incidence angle of the incoming ENAs. From these raw data it calculates their trajectory and velocity and generates images of the magnetospheric regions from which they are emitted. The imager consists of three identical sensor heads mounted on a DPU. The three sensor heads are mounted side by side on top of the DPU. The middle sensor looks straight ahead, with a 107° field of view in the plane of the spin axis. The look directions of the two side sensors are offset from that of the middle sensor by 20°. This 20° offset compensates for a 20° blind spot in the center of each detector. The resulting field of view in the plane of the spin axis is 147°. The MENA DPU consists of a single 16-bit Harris RTX2010 microcontroller operating at 4.91 MHz, look-up tables used to process the raw data, a low-voltage power supply, a high-voltage controller, and, for each of the three sensors, the front end time of flight and pulse height electronics and high-voltage power supplies. The DPU communicates with the sensor heads and the Central Instrument Data Processor (CIDP). It monitors instrument health and safety and receives and processes the raw sensor data, producing one image every two minutes (i. e. each spacecraft spin period). It transmits this image, together with a selection of the raw sensor data, event rate data, and housekeeping data, to the CIDP for downlink to Earth.

=== Radio Plasma Imager (RPI) ===
The Radio Plasma Imager (RPI) used pulses of radio waves to "sound" nearly the entire volume of the Earth's magnetic field. With its 502 m (1,647 ft) tip-to-tip antenna, it is one of the biggest sensors ever flown in space. Like a policeman's radar detector, the RPI's 10-watt transmitter sent out a burst of radio waves, which reflected off of clouds of charged particles between the plasmasphere's outer boundary all the way out to the boundary where the Earth's magnetic field is impacted by the solar wind. The RPI "radar" scans across a spectrum from 3 kilohertz (cycles per second) up to 3 megahertz, spanning the entire AM radio band and beyond. Every five minutes, an image was built from the returned radio signals that will contain information about the direction, speed and density of distant plasma clouds. The instrument was developed by a team led by Dr. Bodo Reinisch, University of Massachusetts at Lowell. The Central Instrument Data Processor (CIDP) provided acquisition, compression, storage and telemetry formatting of science data from all imagers, routes commands to the imagers and interfaces with the spacecraft systems. The CIDP was developed by SwRI.

== Lost contact ==
On 18 December 2005, the satellite failed to make an expected contact at 16:20 UTC. An earlier contact had ended successfully at 07:39 the same day with no sign of trouble. Over the following days and weeks, commands were sent "blind" to reset the transmitter, change antennas, and otherwise attempt to re-establish contact with the spacecraft, but no signal (not even an unmodulated carrier wave) was received. Recovery efforts included using different NASA Deep Space Network (NASA DSN) antennas, using non-NASA ground stations in case there was some systematic NASA DSN error, transmitting no commands for several days to trigger a 72-hour watchdog timer, increasing transmit power in case the antenna was badly misaligned, and optical and radar observations of the satellite to check for debris, change in spin rate or change in orbit indicative of a collision or other damage.

The spacecraft was also commanded to slightly increase its spin rate and asymmetrically turn on its heaters. If observed, these would indicate that it could receive commands but not transmit. Neither change was seen and analysis later indicated that the temperature change would have been undetectable. An attempt to observe the craft's temperature to determine if it was completely dead or consuming the power expected in safe mode was inconclusive.

A careful failure analysis revealed that, among plausible causes for an abrupt bidirectional loss of communication, the Solid State Power Converter (SSPC) for the transponder had, among its features, an "instant trip" shutdown in response to a high-current (100 A) short circuit. Critically, such a shutdown was not reported in the power supply's telemetry output and this lack was not documented. Because it was undocumented the spacecraft's hardware and software had no provision for attempting to reset the SSPC if it reported good status. This would result in the observed symptoms: no radio communication with an apparently undamaged spacecraft.

Although such a short circuit would be almost impossible without fatal damage to the spacecraft, the shutdown could be falsely triggered by a radiation-induced single event upset. It could be simply fixed by power-cycling the supply, but the spacecraft design left no way to send such a command, nor was one built in.

The same problem with the same model of power supply had affected the Earth Observing-1 (EO-1) and Wilkinson Microwave Anisotropy Probe (WMAP) satellites (launched after IMAGE), but they were able to recover.

In January 2006, NASA declared the mission over, declaring that "Preliminary analysis indicated the craft's power supply subsystems failed, rendering it lifeless". Despite this, they continued to try and establish contact. In early 2006, NASA convened a board of experts to figure out what went wrong. After several months they created a report in which they theorized that IMAGE had tripped a power breaker and might fix itself.

It was hoped that an eclipse when the spacecraft passed through the Earth's shadow in October 2007 would result in a sufficiently deep supply voltage sag that it would trigger a total bus reset, which would cause a power cycle of the suspect supply. However, attempts to contact the craft after this eclipse were not successful.

== Recovery efforts ==
On 20 January 2018 IMAGE was found by Canadian radio amateur and satellite tracker Scott Tilley to be broadcasting, and he reported it to NASA. He had been scanning the S-band (microwaves) in the hopes of finding the Zuma satellite.

On 24 January 2018, Richard Burley of NASA reported that they were trying to establish communication with the satellite using the NASA DSN. Two days later, Burley reported that engineers at Goddard Space Flight Center (GSFC) successfully acquired the signal, and confirmed on 30 January 2018 that IMAGE is the source. It is not known when the satellite started broadcasting, but re-examination of old data recorded by Tilley and fellow satellite tracker Cees Bassa showed transmissions from the same satellite in October 2016 and May 2017. Bassa hypothesized that while the 2007 eclipse did not manage to reset the satellite, another one did the trick, probably sometime between 2014 and 2016.

On 8 February 2018, NASA published a detailed account of the IMAGE satellite's recovery. The satellite was transmitting data beyond simple telemetry, indicating that some of its six onboard instruments were still active. NASA engineers are attempting to determine the satellite's status, but since the software and hardware type used in the IMAGE Mission Operations Center have been discarded and no longer exist, they are in the process of adapting old software and databases to their modern systems and track down replacement hardware.

On 25 February 2018, NASA again lost contact with the satellite, but not in the same manner it did in 2005. Richard Burley, former IMAGE mission director, stated that he believes there is an issue with IMAGE's spin axis in relation to its medium-gain antenna placement. If NASA can regain control of the spacecraft, and the status of data and ground systems can be assessed, it will decide if it can fund a mission restart.

On 4 March 2018, the Applied Physics Laboratory at Johns Hopkins University reported detecting the signal from the satellite, but it was too faint to lock onto.

On 9 May 2018, Scott Tilley again detected a strong signal from IMAGE. Hours later NASA and APL engineers had locked onto the signal and were receiving telemetry. Commands were transmitted to IMAGE, but for unknown reasons the spacecraft only acknowledged receipt of a fraction of those commands.

On 28 August 2018, NASA announced that the IMAGE team had stopped receiving any signals from the satellite, as previously happened in winter, and would continue to try sending commands.

On 20 January 2019, a full year passed since the spacecraft's rediscovery date and it has remained out of contact since 5 August 2018. Efforts continue, especially following eclipses which might reset the electronics.

== Gallery ==
Photos of IMAGE

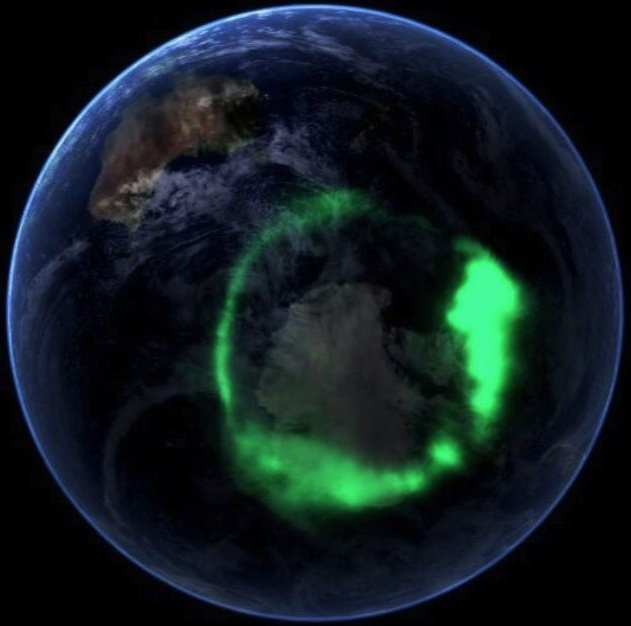
False-colour image montage of ultraviolet aurora australis

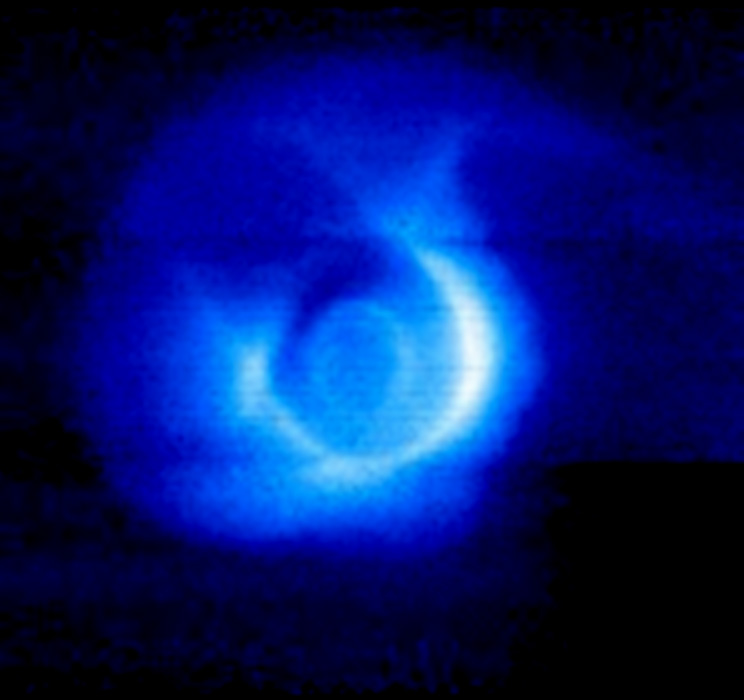
Picture of the ultraviolet glow from relatively cold plasma surrounding Earth

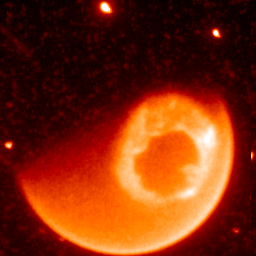
An aurora as seen by the Far-Ultraviolet (FUV) imager during the Bastille Day event.

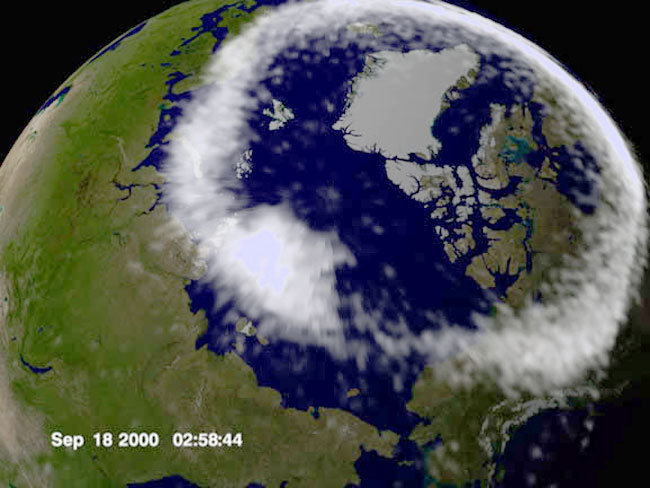
False-colour image of ultraviolet auroral lights from particles excited by collisions with protons, so called proton aurorae

== See also ==
- Explorer program
- Galaxy 15
- Magnetospheric Multiscale Mission
- Zombie Satellite
