= OV2-3 =

US Air Force satellite

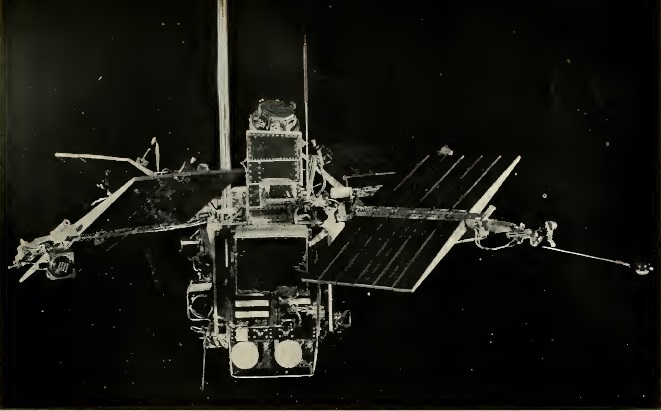
- OV2-3 at Cape Kennedy not long before launch
- Mission type: Life science
- Operator: USAF
- COSPAR ID: 1965-108A
- SATCAT no.: 13912

Spacecraft properties
- Manufacturer: Northrop
- Launch mass: 194 kg (428 lb)

Start of mission
- Launch date: 22 December 1965, 14:00:01 UTC
- Rocket: Titan IIIC
- Launch site: Cape Canaveral LC41

Orbital parameters
- Reference system: Geocentric
- Regime: Highly elliptical
- Eccentricity: 0.71885
- Perigee altitude: 167 km (104 mi)
- Apogee altitude: 33,662 km (20,917 mi)
- Inclination: 26.300°
- Period: 589.20 minutes
- Epoch: 21 December 1965

Orbiting Vehicle 2-3 (COSPAR ID: 1965-108A, also known as OV2-3), the second satellite of the second series of the United States Air Force's Orbiting Vehicle program, was an American solar astronomy, geomagnetic and particle science research satellite. Launched 22 December 1965 along with three other satellites, the mission resulted in failure when the spacecraft failed to separate from the upper stage of its Titan IIIC.

== Background ==
The Orbiting Vehicle satellite program arose from a US Air Force initiative, begun in the early 1960s, to reduce the expense of space research. Through this initiative, satellites would be standardized to improve reliability and cost-efficiency, and where possible, they would fly on test vehicles or be piggybacked with other satellites. In 1961, the Air Force Office of Aerospace Research (OAR) created the Aerospace Research Support Program (ARSP) to request satellite research proposals and choose mission experiments. The USAF Space and Missiles Organization created their own analog of the ARSP called the Space Experiments Support Program (SESP), which sponsored a greater proportion of technological experiments than the ARSP. Five distinct OV series of standardized satellites were developed under the auspices of these agencies.

The OV2 series of satellites was originally designed as part of the ARENTS (Advanced Research Environmental Test Satellite) program, intended to obtain supporting data for the Vela satellites, which monitored the Earth for violations of the 1963 Partial Test Ban Treaty. Upon the cancellation of ARENTS due to delays in the Centaur rocket stage, the program's hardware (developed by General Dynamics) was repurposed to fly on the Titan III (initially the A, ultimately the C) booster test launches. The USAF contracted Northrop to produce these satellites, with William C. Armstrong of Northrop Space Laboratories serving as the program manager.

The first satellite in the OV2 series, OV2-1, was launched 15 October 1965 with a suite of radiation measuring experiments; it was lost when its booster broke up in orbit. The next satellite in the series, OV2-2, was to carry out optical measurements from an altitude of 400 kilometres (250 mi), but the mission was cancelled when the Titan III test schedule was truncated. Instead, OV2-3, with several solar experiments, was scheduled for the next Titan III launch.

== Spacecraft design ==
OV2-3 was built to the configuration standard to all of the OV2 satellites, with a roughly cubical structure of aluminum honeycomb, .61 m (2.0 ft) in height, and .58 m (1.9 ft) wide. Four 2.3 m (7.5 ft) paddle-like solar panels, each with 20,160 solar cells, were mounted at the four upper corners of the main body. The power system, which included NiCd batteries for night-time operations, provided 63 W of power. As with the other craft in the OV2 series, experiments were generally mounted outside the cube while satellite systems, including tape recorder, command receiver, and PAM/FM/FM telemetry system, were installed inside. Four small solid rocket motors spun, one on each paddle, were designed to spin the OV2 satellites upon reaching orbit, providing gyroscopic stability. Cold-gas jets maintained this stability, receiving information on the satellite's alignment with respect to the Sun via an onboard solar aspect sensor, and with respect to the local magnetic field via two onboard fluxgate magnetometers. A damper kept the satellite from precessing (wobbling around its spin axis). Passive thermal control kept the satellite from overheating. The entire satellite weighed 194 kg (428 lb).

== Experiments ==
The Air Force's Cambridge Research Center in conjunction with Space Systems Division and Aerospace Corporation designed the scientific and engineering experiment package of fifteen instruments designed to measure radiation of solar and geomagnetic origin.

== Mission ==
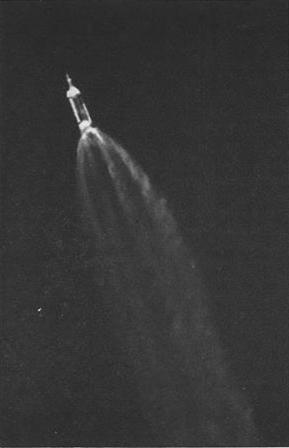
Titan 3C launch 22 Dec 1965

OV2-3, along with LES-3, LES-4, and OSCAR 4, was launched on the third Titan IIIC test flight on 22 December 1965 at 14:00:01 UT from Cape Canaveral LC41 just one second behind schedule. From an initial parking orbit of 194 kilometres (121 mi), the Titan's Transtage boosted into a transfer orbit pending a final burn to circularize its orbit. However, this final burn, scheduled for T+6:03:04 after liftoff, never occurred due to a leaking valve in the booster's attitude control system. LES-3, LES-4, and OSCAR 4 were released from the Transtage, albeit much later than intended, but OV2-3 remained attached and did not operate.

== Legacy and status ==
After the failure of OV2-3, Lt. Col. John C. Hill, commander of the Los Angeles OAR unit that implemented the OV program, commented, "This is an illustration of what happens when you try to save money and go high risk—scientists lose a year of work." The satellite and its Transtage are still in orbit as of November 2020.

The OV2 series had just one (qualified) success: the radiation and astronomical satellite, OV2-5, launched in 1968.
