= Zuma (satellite) =

Classified United States government satellite

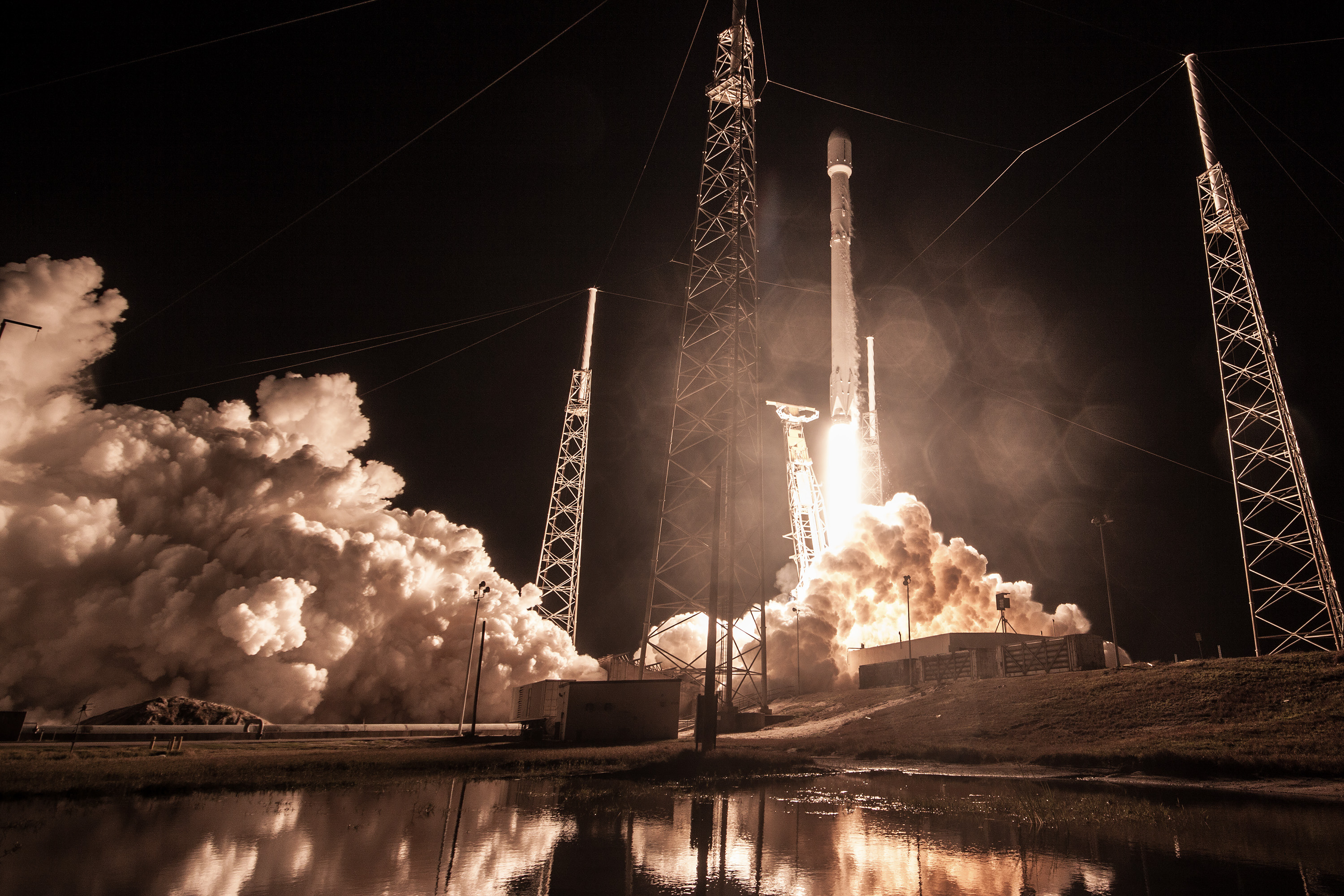
- Launch by SpaceX of the Zuma satellite
- Names: USA-280; Mission 1390
- Mission type: Military (classified)
- Operator: Northrop Grumman, for the U.S. government
- COSPAR ID: 2018-001A
- SATCAT no.: 43098

Spacecraft properties
- Manufacturer: Northrop Grumman

Start of mission
- Launch date: 8 January 2018, 01:00 UTC
- Rocket: Falcon 9 Full Thrust
- Launch site: Cape Canaveral, SLC-40
- Contractor: SpaceX

End of mission
- Decay date: 8 January 2018?

Orbital parameters
- Reference system: Geocentric
- Regime: Low Earth
- Inclination: ≈51°

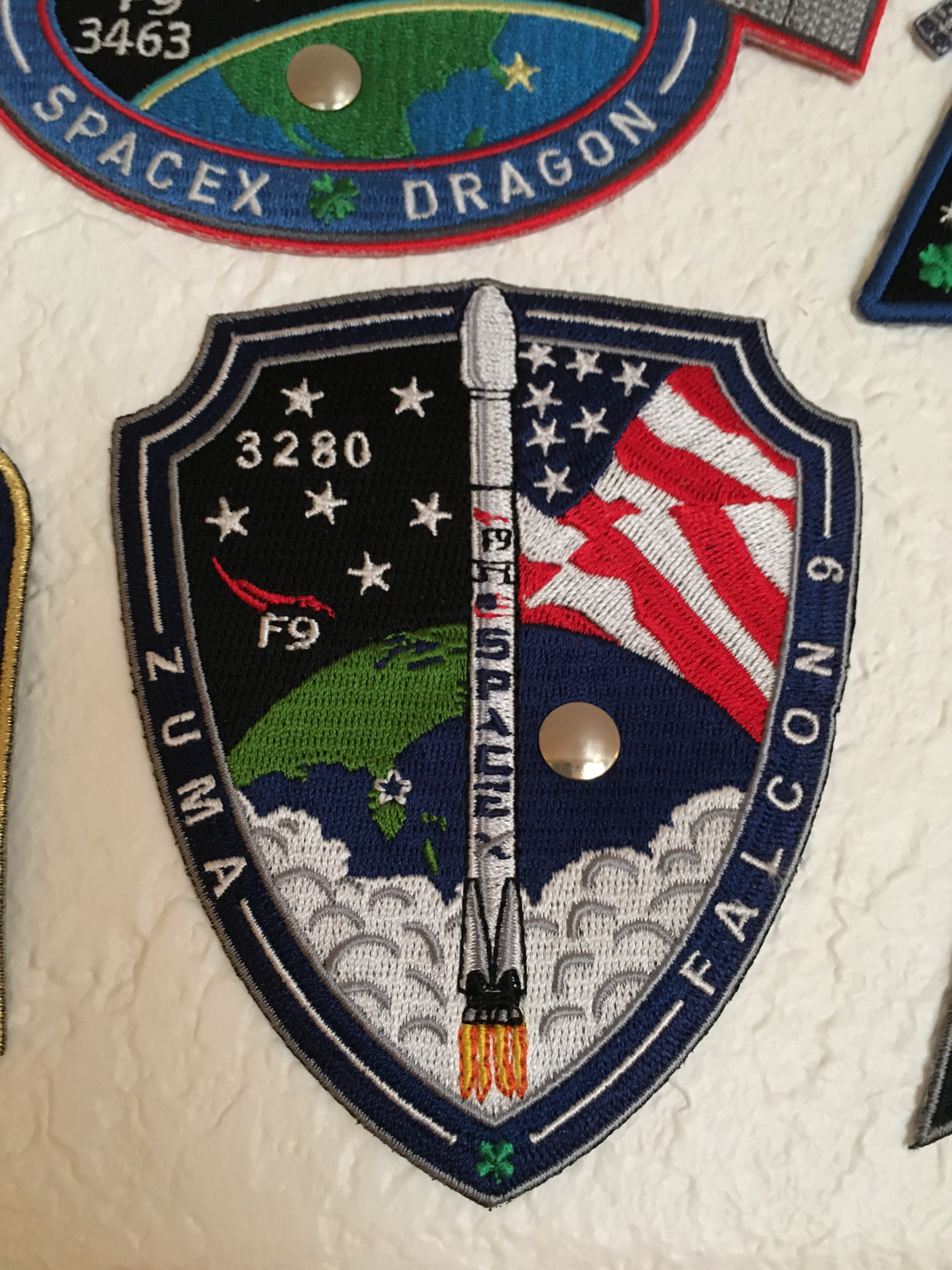
SpaceX Zuma mission patch

USA-280 (codenamed "Zuma") was a classified United States government satellite that was launched by SpaceX on 8 January 2018, on the 47th flight of the Falcon 9 rocket. The National Reconnaissance Office was in charge of the Zuma project, though its purpose has not been disclosed. In November 2017, Northrop Grumman stated that the launch "is a monumental responsibility and has taken great care to ensure the most affordable and lowest risk scenario for Zuma." The Wall Street Journal reported that the design was very sensitive to vibration and sudden shocks, and had a development cost approaching US$3.5 billion.

Following the launch, unnamed sources stated that the satellite was lost during deployment and re-entered the atmosphere, and independent investigations concluded that the spacecraft likely failed to separate from its payload adapter.

== Launch ==
External videos
- SpaceX webcast of Zuma launch on YouTube
- ZUMA Mission

In September 2017, SpaceX sent applications to the Federal Communications Commission (FCC) for special temporary authority to transmit signals at 2.2 GHz during launch of "Mission 1390", for the time period between November 2017 and April 2018.

The satellite, manufactured by Northrop Grumman, was initially scheduled to launch on a Falcon 9 from Kennedy Space Center Launch Complex 39A (LC-39A) in mid-November 2017, and launch-license LLS 17-104 for the rocket was issued by the Office of Commercial Space Transportation on 9 November 2017. Northrop Grumman purchased a payload adapter to customize the release mechanism, which was then tested three times on the ground prior to payload fairing encapsulation.

The Falcon rocket performed a static fire test as part of its pre-flight preparation, but results from a payload fairing test for another customer led to a delay of nearly two months. On 22 December 2017, the launch license was re-issued with a change of the launchpad from Launch Complex 39A to Launch Complex 40. The launch was subsequently rescheduled for 4 January 2018, and was further delayed because of weather concerns related to the January 2018 North American blizzard.

The satellite was launched on 8 January 2018 at 01:00 UTC from Cape Canaveral Air Force Station Space Launch Complex 40 (SLC-40) in Florida. The Falcon 9 first stage touched down at Landing Zone 1, and SpaceX later announced that all data indicated the launch vehicle had performed properly. At approximately 03:15 UTC, the pilot of an aircraft traveling over Khartoum, as well as another person in Sudan, observed a spiral-shaped fuel dump attributed to the re-entering upper stage.

== Fate ==
The fate of the spacecraft is not publicly known. According to unsourced media claims, U.S. lawmakers were reportedly briefed about the loss of the spacecraft and an unnamed government official said that it had re-entered the atmosphere over the Indian Ocean, possibly due to a failure in the payload adapter provided by Northrop Grumman in detaching from the second stage. According to The Wall Street Journal, sensors had not reported the initial failure to detach. Later on, Zuma did ultimately detach from the upper stage payload adapter, but only after it was too late and with the orbit too low to attempt a rescue of the satellite.

President and COO of SpaceX Gwynne Shotwell stated, "For clarity: after review of all data to date, Falcon 9 did everything correctly on Sunday night. If we or others find otherwise based on further review, we will report it immediately. Information published that is contrary to this statement is categorically false. Due to the classified nature of the payload, no further comment is possible." Lon Rains, Communications Director of Northrop Grumman, stated that the company could not comment on the status of classified missions. Three days later, the Zuma mission patch had been removed from sale in the souvenir shop at the Air Force Space and Missile Museum and from online sales.

On 8 April 2018, The Wall Street Journal reported that two independent investigations "tentatively concluded" that the spacecraft failed to separate from the payload adapter after launch due to errors introduced by Northrop Grumman. The adapter had been bought by Northrop Grumman from a subcontractor and heavily modified for use on the mission. Due to the classified nature of the mission, detailed information on the satellite and its fate may not be publicly released. Officially, North American Aerospace Defense Command (NORAD) still lists the satellite but with no orbital parameters and the orbital status code "no elements available", which is standard procedure for classified missions.

== In the media ==
The U.S. government has not publicly stated if there was a failure of Zuma, and this secrecy has generated speculations on its purpose and its fate. A number of articles published by the amateur satellite tracking community stated that if the satellite was still in orbit or operating covertly, then it would likely be located visually. In the process of searching for Zuma, amateur astronomers instead found radio transmissions from IMAGE, a NASA satellite that was lost in 2005.

== Gallery ==
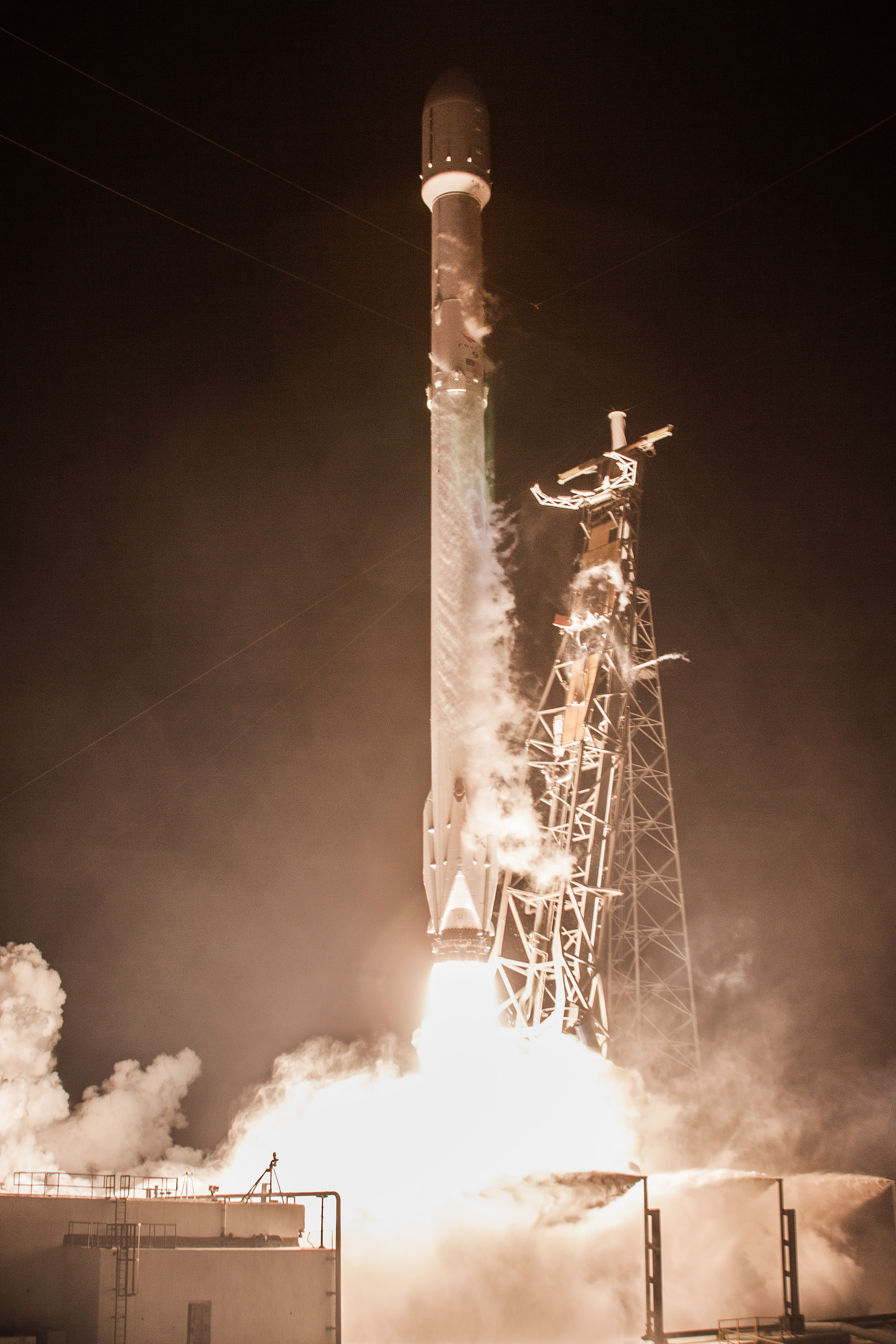
Launch of Zuma

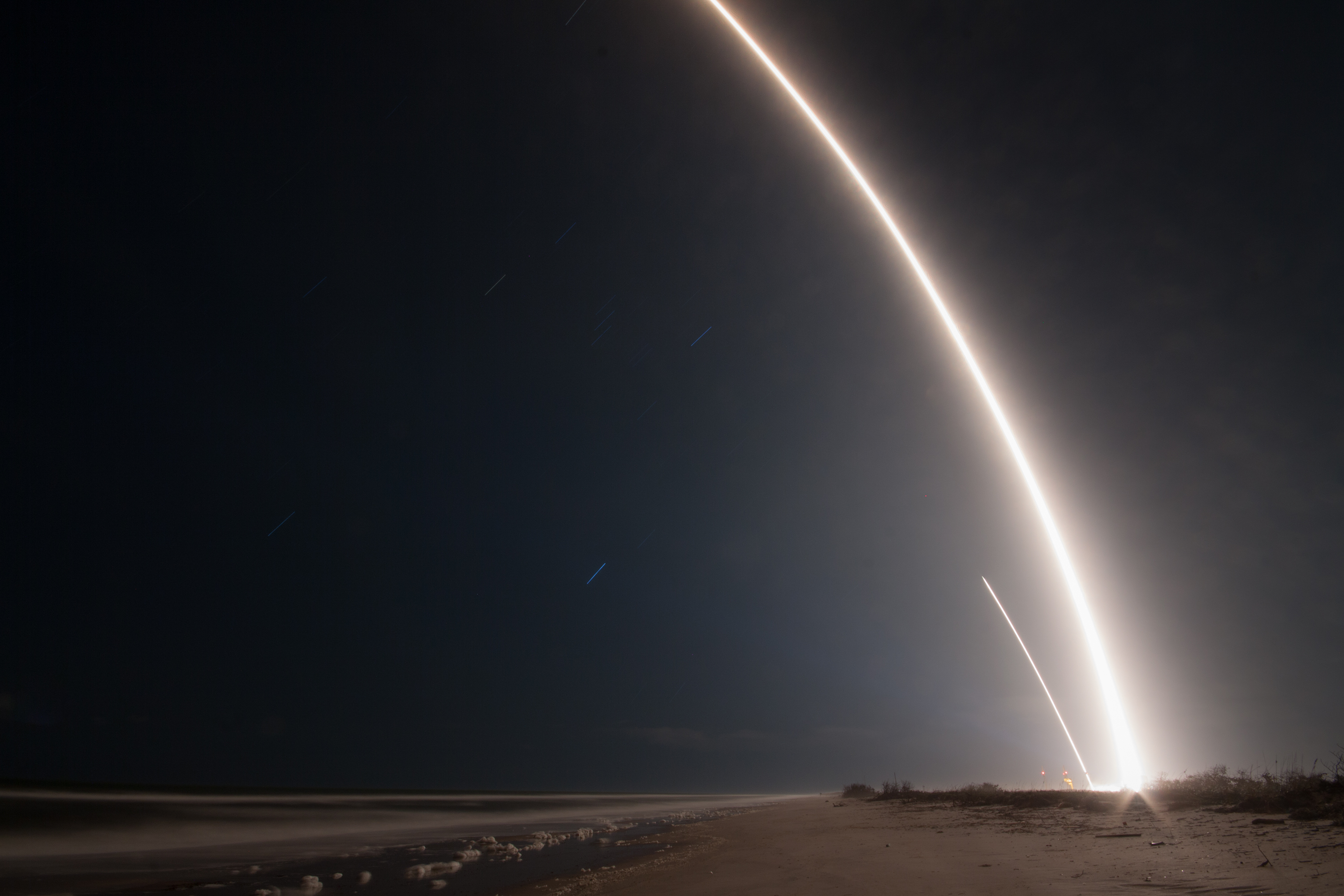
Long exposure of the launch and landing of the first stage of the Falcon 9

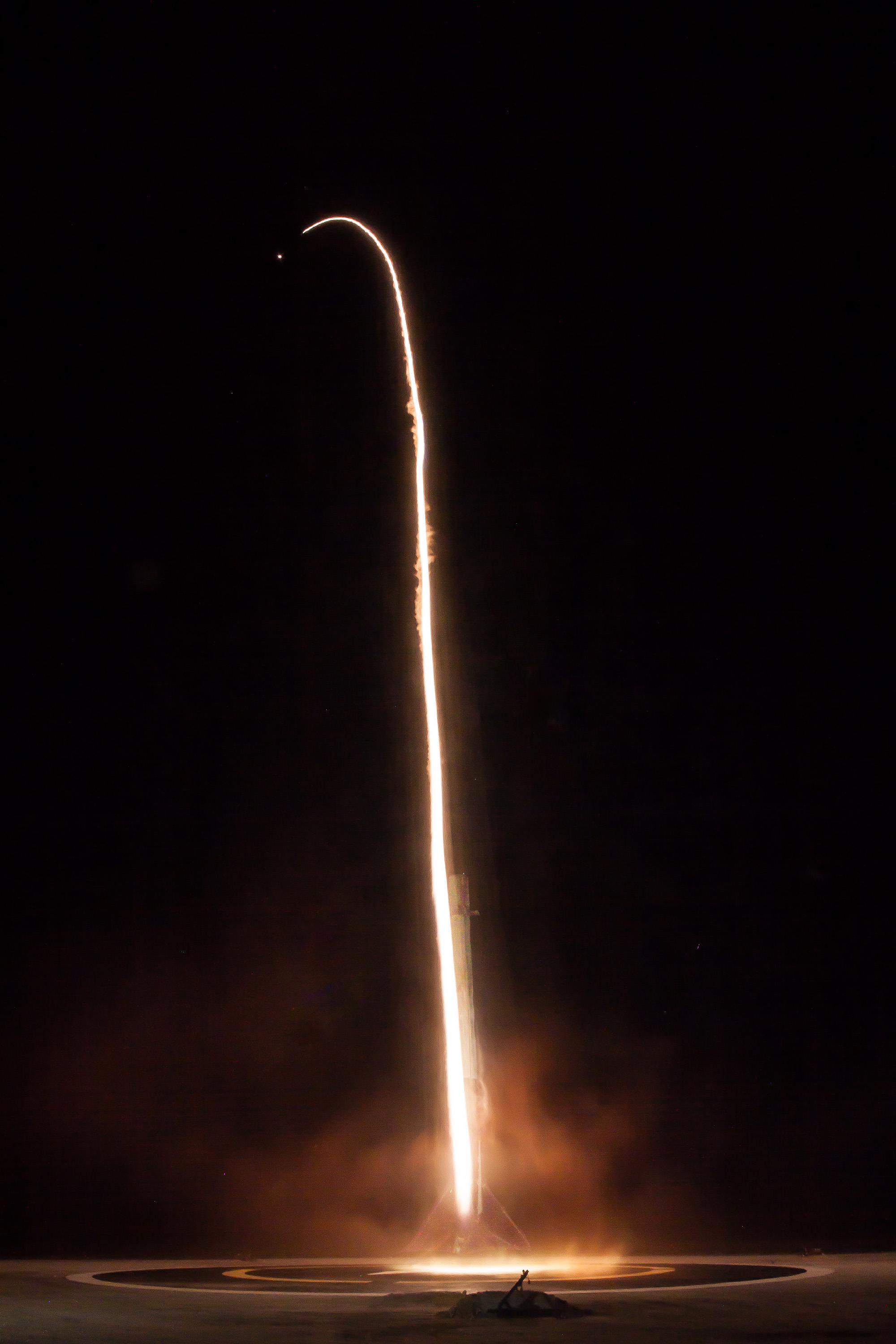
Long exposure of the first stage reentry and landing
