= Discoverer 36 =

American satellite launched in 1961

- Mission type: Optical reconnaissance
- Operator: US Air Force/NRO
- Harvard designation: 1961 Alpha Kappa 1
- COSPAR ID: 1961-034A
- SATCAT no.: 00213
- Mission duration: 4 days

Spacecraft properties
- Spacecraft type: KH-3 Corona
- Bus: Agena-B
- Manufacturer: Lockheed
- Launch mass: 1,150 kilograms (2,540 lb)

Start of mission
- Launch date: 12 December 1961, 20:40 UTC
- Rocket: Thor DM-21 Agena-B 325
- Launch site: Vandenberg LC-75-3-4

End of mission
- Decay date: 8 March 1962

Orbital parameters
- Reference system: Geocentric
- Regime: Low Earth
- Perigee altitude: 223 kilometers (139 mi)
- Apogee altitude: 445 kilometers (277 mi)
- Inclination: 81.1 degrees
- Period: 91.2 minutes

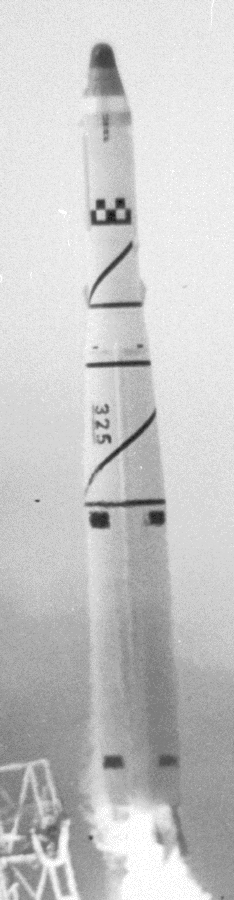
The launch of Discoverer 36

Discoverer 36, also known as Corona 9029, was an American optical reconnaissance satellite which was launched in 1961. It was a KH-3 Corona satellite, based on an Agena-B rocket. It was the penultimate KH-3 satellite to be launched, the last successful mission, and the most successful of the program.

The launch of Discoverer 36 occurred at 20:40 UTC on 12 December 1961. A Thor DM-21 Agena-B rocket was used, flying from Launch Complex 75-3-4 at the Vandenberg Air Force Base. Upon successfully reaching orbit, it was assigned the Harvard designation 1961 Alpha Kappa 1. OSCAR 1, the first amateur radio satellite, was launched aboard the same rocket.

Discoverer 36 was operated in a low Earth orbit, with a perigee of 223 kilometres (139 mi), an apogee of 445 kilometres (277 mi), 81.1 degrees of inclination, and a period of 91.2 minutes. The satellite had a mass of 1,150 kilograms (2,540 lb), and was equipped with a panoramic camera with a focal length of 61 centimetres (24 in), which had a maximum resolution of 7.6 metres (25 ft). Images were recorded onto 70-millimeter (2.8 in) film, and returned in a Satellite Recovery Vehicle four days after launch. The Satellite Recovery Vehicle used by Discoverer 36 was SRV-525. Once its images had been returned, Discoverer 36 remained in orbit until it decayed on 8 March 1962.
