= RADCAL =

Radar calibration satellite

- Manufacturer photograph of RADCAL
- Mission type: Radar calibration
- Operator: United States Air Force
- COSPAR ID: 1993-041A
- SATCAT no.: 22698
- Mission duration: 3 year (design life)

Spacecraft properties
- Launch mass: 89.3 kilograms (197 lb)

Start of mission
- Launch date: 23:30:00 UTC on 25 June 1993 UTC
- Rocket: Scout S217C
- Launch site: Vandenberg SLC-5

End of mission
- Declared: 2013

Orbital parameters
- Reference system: Geocentric
- Regime: Low Earth
- Eccentricity: 0.00754
- Perigee altitude: 791 kilometres (492 mi)
- Apogee altitude: 9,000 kilometres (5,600 mi)
- Inclination: 89.5 degrees
- Period: 101.40 minutes
- Epoch: 26 June 1993

RADCAL (short for RADar CALibration Satellite) was a radar calibration satellite launched and operated by the United States Air Force. It was active from June 1993 until it stopped communicating in May 2013.

== Design ==
=== Construction ===
RADCAL was built by Defense Systems Inc. as United States Air Force Space Test Program payload P92-1. It was built under a one-year contract-to-launch and cost $10 million.

=== Components ===
Payload included two C Band transponders (operating at the same frequency as space-detection radars), a Doppler beacon that transmitted at 150 and 400 MHz, and a pair of modified Trimble Inc. TANS Quadrex Global Positioning System receivers. The receivers were used to determine the satellite's orbit as a reference for calibrating space detection radars. It also carried the Small Satellite Power System Regulator, an experiment testing improved battery charging on solar panel-equipped vehicles.

== Mission ==
=== Launch ===
RADCAL launched into polar orbit at 23:30:00 UTC on 25 June 1993 from Vandenberg Air Force Base's Space Launch Complex 5. The launch vehicle was Scout S217C.

=== Operation ===
RADCAL was used to calibrate ground-based space tracking radars: they would track it and compare their estimated position to its true position. By the end of its operational lifetime, it was one of only two functional radar performance monitoring satellites (along with DMSP F-15) and was actively used by a number of civilian and military organizations. Its GPS receivers were used in experiments to determine its attitude in space. It was the first satellite to use a GPS to determine its attitude. RADCAL was designed to last for three years, but remained operational until May 2013.
