= Lincoln Experimental Satellite =

US research satellites, 1965–1976

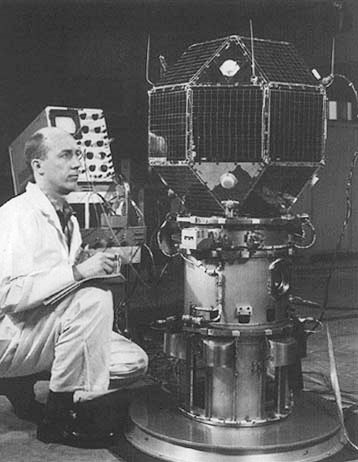
LES-1

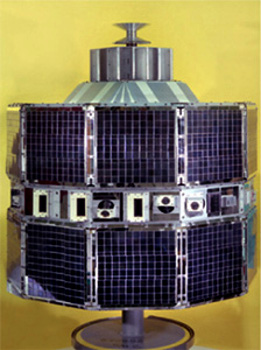
LES-4

The Lincoln Experimental Satellite series was designed and built by Lincoln Laboratory at Massachusetts Institute of Technology between 1965 and 1976, under USAF sponsorship, for testing devices and techniques for satellite communication.

== Development ==
After the successful development and deployment of Project West Ford, a passive communications system consisting of orbiting copper needles, MIT's Lincoln Laboratory turned to improving active-satellite space communications. In particular, Lincoln aimed to increase the transmission capability of communications satellites ("downlink"), which was necessarily constrained by their limited size. After receiving a charter in 1963 to build and demonstrate military space communications, Lincoln focused on a number of engineering solutions to the downlink problem including improved antennas, better stabilization of satellites in orbit (which would benefit both downlink and "uplink"—communications from the ground), high-efficiency systems of transmission modulation/de-modulation, and cutting-edge error-checking techniques.

These experimental solutions were deployed in a series of nine spacecraft called Lincoln Experimental Satellites (LES). Concurrent with their development, Lincoln also developed the Lincoln Experimental Terminals (LET), ground stations that used interference-resistant signaling techniques that allowed use of communications satellites by up to hundreds of users at a time, mobile or stationary, without involving elaborate systems for synchronization and centralized control.

The 1st, 2nd, and 4th satellites in the LES series were designated "X-Band satellites," designed to conduct experiments in the X band, the military's super high frequency (SHF) band (7 to 8 GHz) because solid-state equipment allowed for comparatively high output in this band, and also because the band had been previously used by West Ford.

== Overview ==
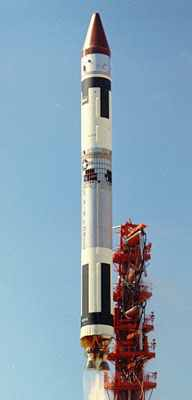
Launch of the Titan IIIA rocket with satellite Lincoln Experimental Satellite 1.

The series had satellites named LES-1 through LES-9. They suffered a number of launch problems - LES-1 and LES-2 were supposed to be delivered to the same 2,800 x 15,000 km orbit, though a failure of a boost stage left LES-1 in a 2,800 km circular orbit. LES-3 and LES-4 were intended to be delivered to geostationary orbit, but a launch problem left them in their transfer orbit. All these satellites returned useful results despite the incorrect orbits. LES-5, -6, -8 and -9 ended up successfully in geostationary orbit; the project that would have been LES-7 ran out of funding and was cancelled. [LES-9 was in an elliptical orbit in the mid-1980s and was used by environmental buoys to communicate data out of the very high northern latitudes. (Geostationary satellites are not visible at those latitudes as they are below the horizon.)]

LES-3 was a very small (16 kg) satellite containing a radio transmitter, intended to measure the extent of multi-path interference due to reflection of 300 MHz radio waves off sufficiently flat parts of the Earth.

Amongst the technologies tested on LES-1 through LES-4 were solid-state X-band radio equipment, low-power logic circuits, electronic despinning (using optics to determine the location of the Earth and Sun relative to a spinning satellite at any moment, and then transmitting via whichever of several antennae were best positioned with respect to the Earth), and magnetic torquers.

LES-8 and LES-9 were satellites of around 450 kg mass, launched on March 14, 1976. They were originally planned to be equipped with pulsed plasma engines but actually launched with gas thrusters; unusually for communication satellites, they are powered by MHW-RTGs rather than by solar panels. There was a cross-link between them in the 36–38 GHz part of the K band, with UHF up- and down-links; and the cross-link technology demonstrated was the basis for current inter-satellite communications used by numerous satellites. The original intention was to run the cross-link at a frequency in the 55–65 GHz range, which is absorbed by water, so that it would be impossible for Earth-based receivers to pick up scattered signals, but technology at the time was inadequate. They operated in geostationary orbit until 1992 and now are drifting slowly.

Lincoln Laboratory's next satellite-communication project after LES was the construction of FLTSAT EHF Packages.

== LES Missions ==
Lincoln Experimental Satellites
Name	COSPAR ID	Launch Vehicle	Launch Date	Reentry Date
LES-1	1965-008C	Titan IIIA-3	11 Feb 1965	
LES-2	1965-034B	Titan IIIA-6	6 May 1965	
LES-3	1965-108D	Titan IIIC-8	21 Dec 1965	6 Apr 1968
LES-4	1965-108B	Titan IIIC-8	21 Dec 1965	19 Aug 1970
LES-5	1967-066E	Titan IIIC-14	1 Jul 1967	
LES-6	1968-081D	Titan IIIC-5	26 Sep 1968	
LES 7	Cancelled			
LES-8	1976-023A	Titan IIIC-30	15 Mar 1976	
LES-9	1976-023B	Titan IIIC-30	15 Mar 1976	

== Current status ==
Amateur radio enthusiasts were able to detect the radio signals emitted from LES-1 at the end of 2012 and the telemetry of LES-5 in 2020. LES-9 was decommissioned in 2020 after 44 years of service, whilst LES-8 was decommissioned in 2004.

== See also ==
- Voyager Program (also used MHW-RTGs, which operated into the 21st century)
