= Titan IIIA =

American expendable launch system

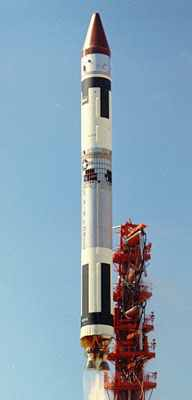
- Launch of a Titan IIIA in November 1965, carrying LES-1
- Function: Prototype expendable launch system
- Manufacturer: Martin Marietta
- Country of origin: United States

Size
- Height: 42 metres (138 ft)
- Diameter: 3.05 metres (10.0 ft)
- Mass: 161,730 kilograms (356,550 lb)
- Stages: 3

Capacity

Payload to LEO
- Mass: 3,100 kilograms (6,800 lb)

Associated rockets
- Family: Titan

Launch history
- Status: Retired
- Launch sites: LC-20, Cape Canaveral
- Total launches: 4
- Success(es): 3
- Failure: 1
- First flight: 1 September 1964
- Last flight: 6 May 1965

First stage
- Powered by: 2 LR87-9
- Maximum thrust: 1,941.7 kilonewtons (436,500 lb_{f})
- Specific impulse: 304s
- Burn time: 164 seconds
- Propellant: N_{2}O_{4} / Aerozine 50

Second stage
- Powered by: 1 LR91-9
- Maximum thrust: 453.7 kilonewtons (102,000 lb_{f})
- Specific impulse: 316 sec
- Burn time: 184 seconds
- Propellant: N_{2}O_{4} / Aerozine 50

Third stage – Transtage
- Powered by: 2 AJ10-138
- Maximum thrust: 71 kilonewtons (16,000 lb_{f})
- Specific impulse: 311 sec
- Burn time: 440 seconds
- Propellant: N_{2}O_{4} / Aerozine 50

The Titan IIIA or Titan 3A was an American expendable launch system, launched four times in 1964 and 1965, to test the Transtage upper stage which was intended for use on the larger Titan IIIC. The Transtage was mounted atop two core stages derived from the Titan II. The Titan IIIA was also used as the core of the Titan IIIC.

Part of the Titan rocket family, the Titan IIIA made its first flight on 1 September 1964. However, the Transtage failed to pressurize, resulting in a premature cutoff and failure to reach orbit. A second test on 10 December was successful. Two further launches occurred in 1965 with Lincoln Experimental Satellites, before the Titan IIIA was retired.

== Launch history ==
Date/time (GMT)	S/N	Payload	Outcome	Remarks
1 September 1964; 15:00:06	3A-2	N/A	Failure	Transtage test flight Transtage failed to pressurize
10 December 1964; 16:52:33	3A-1	N/A	Success	Transtage test flight
11 February 1965; 15:19:05	3A-3	LES-1	Success	
6 May 1965; 15:00:03	3A-4	LES-2/LCS-1	Success	
