= LES-1 =

American communications satellite

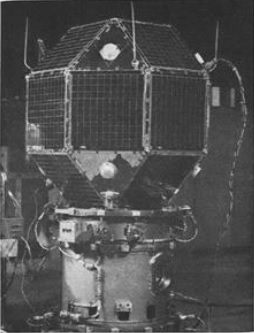
- Image of Lincoln Experimental Satellite (LES) 1
- Mission type: Communications satellite
- Operator: USAF
- COSPAR ID: 1965-008C
- SATCAT no.: 01002
- Mission duration: 60 years, 7 months, 26 days (elapsed)

Spacecraft properties
- Manufacturer: Lincoln Laboratory
- Launch mass: 31 kg (68 lb)

Start of mission
- Launch date: 11 Feb 1965, 15:19:05 UTC
- Rocket: Titan IIIA
- Launch site: Cape Canaveral LC20

Orbital parameters
- Reference system: Geocentric
- Regime: Low Earth
- Eccentricity: 0.00109
- Perigee altitude: 2,780 km (1,730 mi)
- Apogee altitude: 2,803 km (1,742 mi)
- Inclination: 32.1°
- Period: 145.80 minutes
- Epoch: 11 Feb 1965

Lincoln Experimental Satellite 1, also known as LES-1, is a communications satellite, the first of nine in the Lincoln Experimental Satellite program. Launched by the United States Air Force (USAF) on February 11, 1965, it pioneered many then-advanced technologies including active use of the X Band (7 to 11.2 GHz) to service hundreds of users. LES-1 did not have a successful operational life due to being placed in a suboptimal orbit, and it ceased transmissions in 1967. After 45 years of inactivity, LES-1 spontaneously resumed transmissions in 2012 making it one of the oldest zombie satellites.

== Background ==
The Lincoln Experimental Satellite (LES) series was MIT's Lincoln Laboratory's first active communications satellite project. Lincoln had previously successfully developed and deployed Project West Ford, a passive communications system consisting of orbiting copper needles. The goal of LES was to increase the transmission capability of communications satellites ("downlink"), which was necessarily constrained by their limited size. After receiving a charter in 1963 to build and demonstrate military space communications, Lincoln focused on a number of engineering solutions to the downlink problem including improved antennas, better stabilization of satellites in orbit (which would benefit both downlink and "uplink"—communications from the ground), high-efficiency systems of transmission modulation/de-modulation, and cutting-edge error-checking techniques.

These experimental solutions were deployed in a series of nine spacecraft called Lincoln Experimental Satellites (LES). Concurrent with their development, Lincoln also developed the Lincoln Experimental Terminals (LET), ground stations that used interference-resistant signaling techniques that allowed use of communications satellites by up to hundreds of users at a time, mobile or stationary, without involving elaborate systems for synchronization and centralized control.

The first, second, and fourth satellites in the LES series were designated "X-Band satellites," designed to conduct experiments in the 7 to 8 GHz spectrum of the X Band, a small section of the SHF (super high frequency) band (7 to 11.2 GHz) because solid-state equipment allowed for comparatively high output in this band, and also because the band had been previously used by Westford.

== Spacecraft design ==
Polyhedral in shape, the 5 ft (1.5 m) spacecraft drew power from 2,376 solar cells, operating only in daylight. LES-1's primary experiments were a solid-state 0.1-watt transmitter, a multiple antenna system switched on by one of the satellite's four optical Earth sensors, and a magnetic coil attitude system. Eight semi-directional horn units evenly spaced around the satellite comprised the antenna system.

The spacecraft was designed to last two years, during which it would be used for communications experiments conducted between stations in Westford, Massachusetts, and Pleasanton, California.

== Mission and results ==
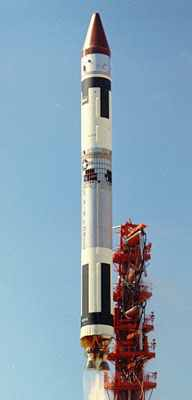
LES-1 launched aboard Titan IIIA No. 3.

LES-1 was launched from Cape Canaveral LC20 11 February 1965, at 15:19:05 UT on a test flight of the Titan IIIA rocket. Though the rocket performed as planned, delivering its satellite payload into a circular orbit, the solid-propellant motor on LES-1 failed to fire, apparently due to miswiring of the ordnance circuitry, stranding LES-1 in that orbit. Moreover, when LES-1 separated from its booster, it was spinning at 3 revolutions per second. When the on-board rocket failed to separate from the satellite, this spin translated into a tumble. A few initial communications tests were conducted. The X-band repeater and antenna switching system functioned properly, but the tumbling rendered LES-1 otherwise useless.

By September 1965, long-term exposure to the Van Allen Belts had reduced the solar array output on LES-1 significantly. The satellite ceased transmitting in 1967.

== Legacy and status ==
LES-1 began transmitting again after 45 years of silence, making it one of the oldest zombie satellites. Its signals were detected by Phil Williams (call sign G3YPQ), from North Cornwall in southwest England on 18 December 2012, verified by other members of Hearsat group, Flávio A. B. Archangelo (call sign PY2ZX) in Brazil on 22 December 2012, and Matthias Bopp (call sign DD1US) in Germany on 27 December 2012.

According to Williams, LES-1 was determined to be tumbling with a rotation rate of once every four seconds, as determined by distinctive fading of the signals. It is possible that, after 47 years, the batteries failed in a manner that allows them to carry charge directly through to the transmitter on 237 MHz, allowing the satellite to resume transmissions when it is in sunlight.

LES-1's transmissions were used as a central element in the artwork Signal Tide by artist duo Kata Kovács and Tom O'Doherty, which was presented at the Los Angeles County Museum of Art in September 2017. The work combines composed and generative music with the live signal of the LES-1, and was undertaken in collaboration with musician David Bryant.

As of 20 February 2024, LES-1 is still in orbit.

The LES program continued through nine satellites, culminating in the launch of LES-8 and LES-9 on 14 March 1976. In 2020, another of the LES family, LES-5, achieved zombie status as its telemetry signal was acquired.
