= Optical cross section =

Optical cross section (OCS) is a value which describes the maximum amount of optical flux reflected back to the source. The standard unit of measurement is m^{2}/sr. OCS is dependent on the geometry and the reflectivity at a particular wavelength of an object. Optical cross section is useful in fields such as LIDAR. In the field of radar this is referred to as radar cross-section. Objects such as license plates on automobiles have a high optical cross section to maximize the laser return to the speed detector gun.

== Flat mirror ==
Optical cross section of a flat mirror with a given reflectivity at a particular wavelength $r(\lambda)$ can be expressed by the formula

$$\mbox{OCS}=r(\lambda) \frac{D^4}{1.4876 \lambda^2}$$

Where $D$ is the cross sectional diameter of the beam. Note that the direction of the light has to be perpendicular to the mirror surface for this formula to be valid, else the return from the mirror would no longer go back to its source.

In order to maximize the return a corner reflector is used. The alignment of a corner reflector with respect to the source is not as critical as the alignment of a flat mirror.

== Other optical devices ==
Optical cross section is not limited to reflective surfaces. Optical devices such as telescopes and cameras will return some of the optical flux back to the source, since it has optics that reflect some light. The Optical cross section of a camera can vary over time due to the camera shutter opening and closing.
