= OSCAR 2 =

Amateur radio satellite

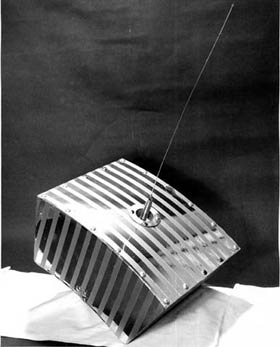
- OSCAR 2
- Mission type: Communications
- Operator: Project OSCAR / DoD
- Harvard designation: 1962 Chi 1
- COSPAR ID: 1962-022B
- SATCAT no.: 305
- Mission duration: 22 days

Spacecraft properties
- Launch mass: 10.0 kilograms (22.0 lb)
- Dimensions: 15.2 by 25.4 by 33 centimeters (6.0 in × 10.0 in × 13.0 in)

Start of mission
- Launch date: 2 June 1962, 00:43 UTC
- Rocket: Thor DM-21 Agena-B
- Launch site: Vandenberg LC-75-3-4

End of mission
- Decay date: 21 June 1962

Orbital parameters
- Reference system: Geocentric
- Regime: Low Earth
- Eccentricity: 0.01399
- Perigee altitude: 207 kilometers (129 mi)
- Apogee altitude: 394 kilometers (245 mi)
- Inclination: 101.00 degrees
- Period: 90.5 minutes

OSCAR 2 is the second amateur radio satellite launched by Project OSCAR into Low Earth orbit. OSCAR 2 was launched June 2, 1962, by a Thor-DM21 Agena B launcher from Vandenberg Air Force Base, Lompoc, California. The satellite, a rectangular box (30 cm × 25 cm × 12 cm (11.8 in × 9.8 in × 4.7 in)) weighing 10 kg (22 lb), was launched as a secondary payload (ballast) for Corona 43, the fifth launch of a KH-4 satellite.

The satellite employed a monopole transmitting antenna 60 cm (24 in) long extended from the center of the convex surface, but had no attitude control system. OSCAR 2 lasted 18 days, ceasing operation on June 20, 1962, and re-entered June 21, 1962.

OSCAR 2 incorporated certain design changes from the earlier OSCAR 1.

The continuous radio Morse message "hi hi hi ..." by the first private satellites called OSCAR, beginning with OSCAR 1 in 1961 (recording from OSCAR 2, 1962)

== See also ==
- OSCAR 1
- OSCAR 3
- AMSAT
