= OSCAR 1 =

Amateur radio satellite

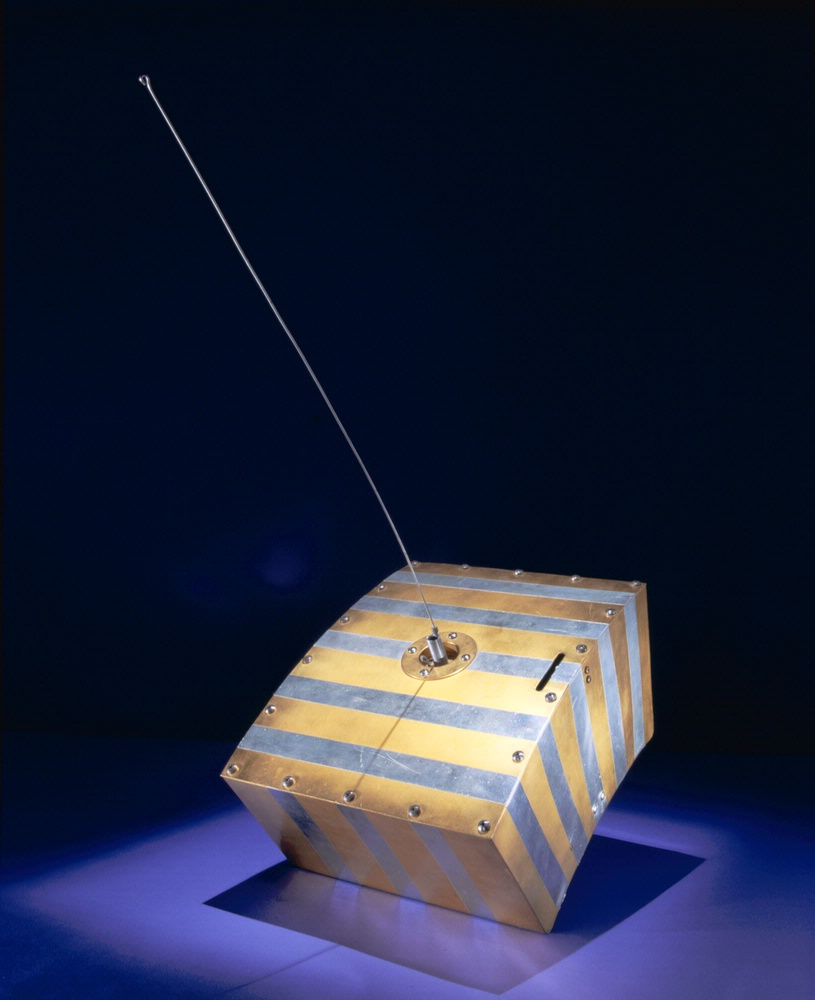
- OSCAR 1
- Mission type: Communications
- Operator: Project OSCAR /
- Harvard designation: 1961 Alpha Kappa 2
- COSPAR ID: 1961-034B
- SATCAT no.: 214
- Mission duration: 20 days

Spacecraft properties
- Launch mass: 10.0 kilograms (22.0 lb)
- Dimensions: 15.2 by 25.4 by 33 centimeters (6.0 in × 10.0 in × 13.0 in)

Start of mission
- Launch date: 12 December 1961, 20:40 UTC
- Rocket: Thor DM-21 Agena-B
- Launch site: Vandenberg LC-75-3-4

End of mission
- Decay date: 31 January 1962

Orbital parameters
- Reference system: Geocentric
- Regime: Low Earth
- Eccentricity: 0.01698
- Perigee altitude: 245 kilometers (152 mi)
- Apogee altitude: 474 kilometers (295 mi)
- Inclination: 81.20 degrees
- Period: 91.1 minutes

OSCAR 1 (Orbiting Satellite Carrying Amateur Radio 1, also known as OSCAR 1) is the first amateur radio satellite launched by Project OSCAR into low Earth orbit. OSCAR I was launched December 12, 1961, by a Thor-Agena B launcher from Vandenberg Air Force Base, Lompoc, California. The satellite, a rectangular box (30 x 25 x 12 cm) weighing 10 kg., was launched as a secondary payload (ballast) for Corona 9029, also known as Discoverer 36, the eighth and final launch of a KH-3 satellite. The first OSCAR satellites were predecessors to the AMSAT-OSCAR satellites.

The satellite had a battery-powered 140 mW transmitter operating in the 2-meter band (144.983 MHz), employed a monopole transmitting antenna 60 cm long extended from the center of the convex surface, but had no attitude control system. Like Sputnik 1, Oscar 1 carried only a simple beacon. For three weeks it transmitted its Morse Code message "HI". To this day, many organizations identify their Morse-transmitting satellites with "HI", which also indicates laughter in amateur telegraphy like LOL.

The continuous radio Morse message "hi hi hi ..." by the first private satellites called OSCAR, beginning with OSCAR 1 in 1961 (recording from OSCAR 2, 1962)

OSCAR I lasted 22 days ceasing operation on January 3, 1962, and re-entered January 31, 1962.

After the launch of OSCAR 1, United States Vice President Lyndon B. Johnson, honored it with a telegram that read: "For me this project is symbolic of the type of freedom for which this country stands — freedom of enterprise and freedom of participation on the part of individuals throughout the world."

== Project OSCAR ==
The genesis of Project OSCAR and OSCAR 1 started in 1959, when Donald Stoner (W6TNS), an amateur radio operator and technical writer, asked if anyone had a spare rocket, as solar power and semiconductor technology had advanced enough to produce small, low power radio repeaters. Thinking similarly, several employees at Lockheed, an aerospace company, founded Project OSCAR in 1960 with the aim of putting a small, amateur-built satellite into orbit. At the time, Lockheed was building launch vehicles and satellites for the US government. Many of these employees were also hams, affiliated with the Lockheed amateur radio club.

The founding board of directors of Project OSCAR LLC were Mirabeau Towns, jr. (K6LFI), Stanley Benson (K6CBK), Harley Gabrielson (W6HEK), Fred Hicks (W6EJU), William Orr (W6SAI), Nicholas Marshall (W6OLO), Harry Engwicht (W6HC), Thomas Lott (VE2AGF), Jerre Crosier (W6IGE), Harry Workman (K6JTC), Richard Esneault (W4IJC/6) and Donald Stoner.

The Project OSCAR team developed OSCAR 1 with support from Lockheed and the United States Air Force. OSCAR 1 launched on December 12, 1961 as a secondary payload on the Thor-Agena launch vehicle, which carried the primary mission Discoverer 36 to orbit.

Project OSCAR also coordinated a ground network for monitoring OSCAR 1, post-launch. Nine amateur stations coordinated around the globe with stations in Antarctica, Hawaii, Connecticut, Alaska and California. Due to Air Force restrictions prior knowledge of the launch schedule was not permitted, so stations exercised practice drills and remained on standby for launch confirmation. Stations made audio tape recordings of OSCAR 1 passes and forwarded data to Sunnyvale, CA for processing. Over 500 ground reception observations were made by amateurs around the world. OSCAR 1 lasted 22 days in orbit.

The design, construction and testing of OSCAR 1 involved many individuals, many of whom were Lockheed employees: Clarence A Andrews, jr. (W0LIIV), Douglas K. Beck (WA6QQI), Albert R. Die (W3LSZ/6), Albert F. Gaetano (W6VZT), Russell Garner (K5VPN/6), Gail Gangwish, H. Hughes, Howard Linnenkohl (K0SDD), H. E. Poole, Charles S. Smallhouse (WA6MGZ) and Lance Ginner (K6GSJ).

Following the success of OSCAR 1, Project OSCAR developed and launched OSCAR 2 and 3.

A spare of OSCAR 1 was donated to the Smithsonian National Air and Space Museum in Washington, D.C., in 1963. A third spare of OSCAR 1 has been restored and is fully operational, running off utility power. As of 2011 it is on display at ARRL HQ in Newington, Connecticut and continues to broadcast "HI" in Morse Code at 145 MHz.

== See also ==
- OSCAR 2
