= Project West Ford =

Experimental space-based radio communication project

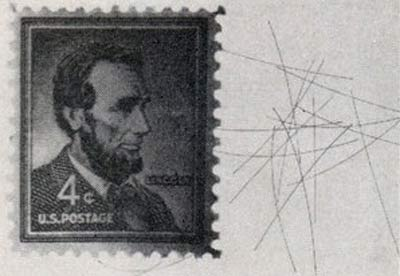
Needles from the West Ford project compared to a stamp

Project West Ford (also known as Westford Needles and Project Needles) was a test carried out by the MIT Lincoln Laboratory on behalf of the United States military in 1961 and 1963 to create an artificial ionosphere above the Earth, to solve a weakness identified in military communications.

== History ==
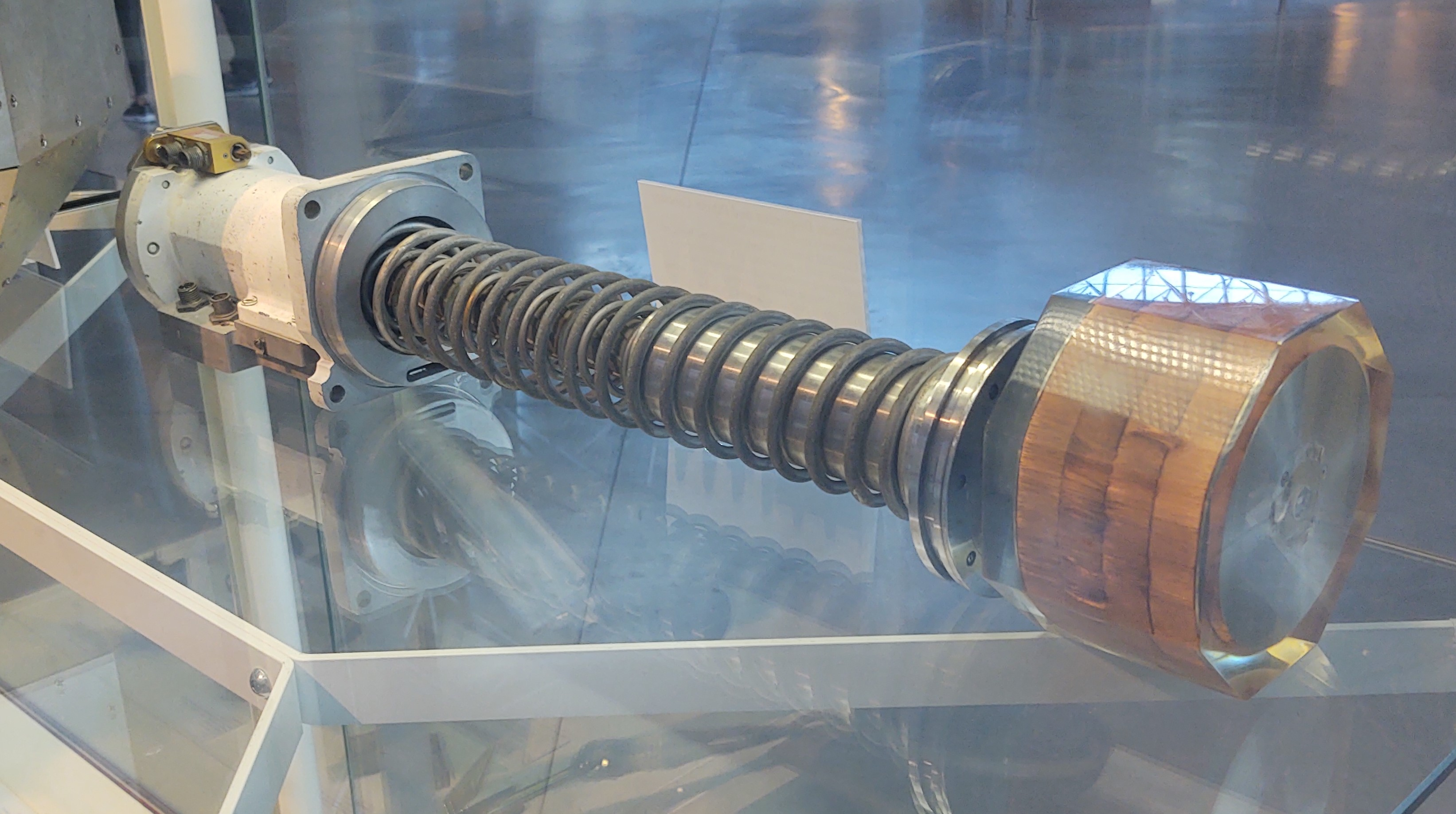
Westford dipole dispenser exhibit at the Steven F. Udvar-Hazy Center

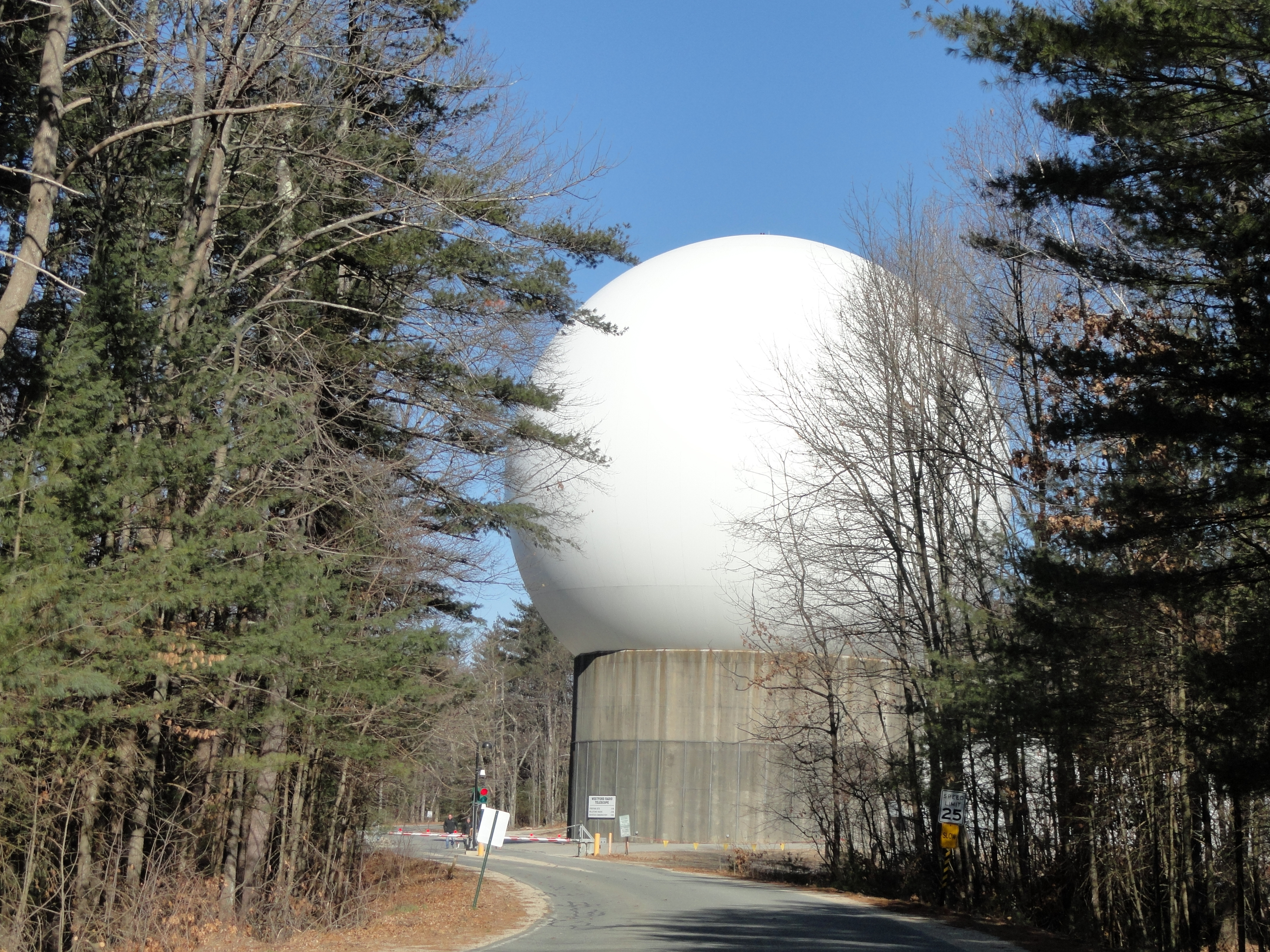
The 18.3 m (60 ft) Westford Radio Telescope was built in 1961 by Lincoln Laboratory for Project West Ford as an X-band radar antenna.

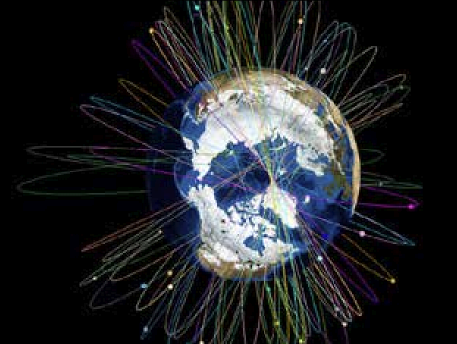
Simulated graphic of 46 clumps of Project West Ford needles known to be in orbit by late 2013

At the height of the Cold War, all international communications were sent either through submarine cables or bounced off the natural ionosphere. The United States military was concerned that the Soviets might cut cables, leaving the unpredictable ionosphere as the only means of communication with overseas forces.

Walter E. Morrow started Project Needles at the MIT Lincoln Laboratory in 1958, with the goal of placing a ring of 480,000,000 copper dipole antennas in orbit to facilitate global radio communication. The dipoles collectively provided passive support to Westford Radio Telescope to communicate with distant sites.

The needles were 1.78 centimeters (0.70 in) long and 25.4 micrometers (1.00 thou) [1961] or 17.8 micrometers (0.70 thou) [1963] in diameter. The length was chosen because it was half the wavelength of the 8 GHz signal used in the study. The needles were placed in medium Earth orbit at an altitude of between 3,500 and 3,800 kilometers (2,200–2,400 mi) at orbital inclinations of 87 and 96 degrees.

A first attempt was launched on October 21, 1961, during which the needles failed to disperse. The project was successful with the May 9, 1963 launch, with radio transmissions carried by the ring. The technology was shelved, partially due to the development of communications satellites and partially due to protests from other scientists.

British radio astronomers, optical astronomers, and the Royal Astronomical Society protested the experiment. The Soviet newspaper Pravda protested under the headline "U.S.A. Dirties Space". The International Academy of Astronautics regards the experiment as the worst deliberate release of space debris.

The issue was raised in the United Nations, where United States Ambassador Adlai Stevenson defended the project. Stevenson studied published journal articles on Project West Ford and allayed the fears of most UN ambassadors, explaining that sunlight pressure would remove the dipoles from orbit after approximately three years. The international protest resulted in a consultation provision included in the 1967 Outer Space Treaty.

Although the dispersed needles fell from orbit within a few years, some that had not deployed correctly remained in clumps, contributing to debris tracked by NASA's Orbital Debris Program Office. Their numbers diminish as they occasionally fall from orbit; as of April 2023, 44 clumps of needles larger than 10 cm were known to remain in orbit.

== Launches ==
Satellite	COSPAR	Date	Launch site	Launch vehicle	Launched in conjunction with
West Ford 1	1961 αδ 3	October 21, 1961	SLC-3E	Atlas-LV3 Agena-B	MiDAS 4
West Ford-Drag	1962 κ 5	April 9, 1962	SLC-3E	Atlas-LV3 Agena-B	MiDAS 5
West Ford 2	1963-014H	May 9, 1963	SLC-3E	Atlas-LV3 Agena-B	MiDAS 6, Dash 1, TRS 5, TRS 6

Launch gallery

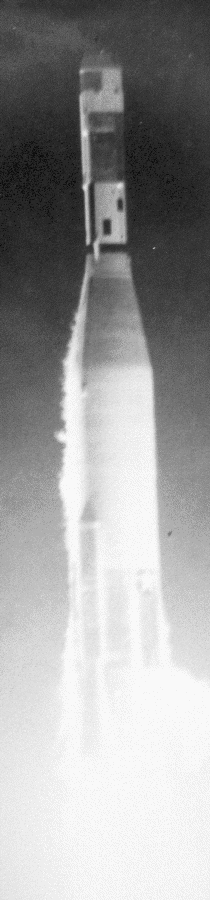
Launch of Atlas 105D with West Ford 1

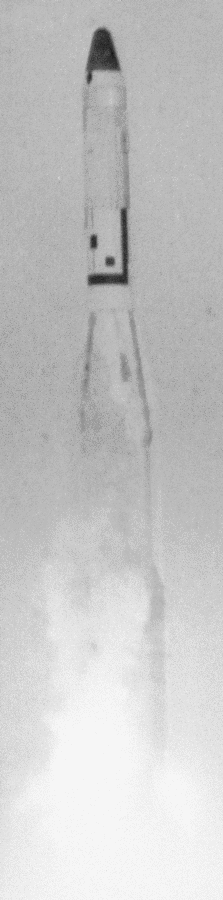
Launch of Atlas 110D with West-Drag

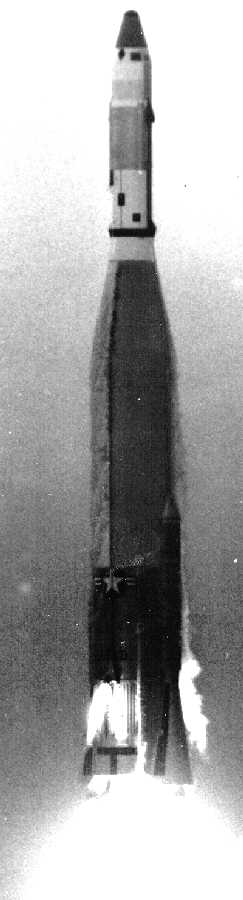
Launch of Atlas 131D with West Ford 2
