= Timeline of artificial satellites and space probes =

This timeline of artificial satellites and space probes includes uncrewed spacecraft including technology demonstrators, observatories, lunar probes, and interplanetary probes. First satellites from each country are included. Not included are most Earth science satellites, commercial satellites or crewed missions.

== Timeline ==
=== 1950s ===
Artificial satellites and space probes in the 1950s
Year	Date	Origin	Name	Launch vehicle	Status	Description	Mass
1957	October 4	USSR	Sputnik 1	Sputnik-PS	Success	The first human-made object to orbit Earth.	83.6 kg (183.9 lb)
1957	November 3	USSR	Sputnik 2	Sputnik-PS	Success	The first satellite to carry a living animal, a dog named Laika.	508 kg (1,118 lb)
1957	December 6	US	Vanguard 1A	Vanguard TV-3	Failure	The first stage engine was improperly started, causing the vehicle to fall back to the launch pad immediately after launch and explode.	1.36 kg (2.99 lb)
1958	February 1	US	Explorer 1	Juno I	Success	The first American satellite in space.	13.91 kg (30.66 lb)
1958	February 5	US	Vanguard 1B	Vanguard TV-3BU	Failure	Control failure caused vehicle breakup at T+57 seconds as vehicle exceeded an angle of attack of 45° due to a control system malfunction.	1.36 kg (2.99 lb)
1958	March 5	US	Explorer 2	Juno I	Failure	Failed to orbit. Fourth stage did not ignite.	14.52 kg (31.94 lb)
1958	March 17	US	Vanguard 1C	Vanguard TV-4	Success	Vanguard 1. Expected to de-orbit in ~2240AD, this and its upper launch stage are the oldest human-made objects in space. Also the first use of solar cells to power a satellite.	1.47 kg (3.25 lb)
1958	March 26	US	Explorer 3	Juno I	Success	Added to data received by Explorer 1.	14.1 kg (31.0 lb)
1958	April 29	US	Vanguard 2A	Vanguard TV-5	Failure	Second stage shutdown sequence not completed, preventing proper 3rd stage separation and firing. Did not reach orbit.	9.98 kg (21.96 lb)
1958	May 15	USSR	Sputnik 3	Sputnik	Success	Contained 12 instruments for a wide range of upper atmosphere tests.	1,327 kg (2,926 lb)
1958	May 28	US	Vanguard 2B	Vanguard SLV-1	Failure	The first production model of the series. Nominal flight until a guidance error was encountered on second stage burnout. Did not reach orbit.	9.98 kg (21.96 lb)
1958	June 26	US	Vanguard 2C	Vanguard SLV-2	Failure	Premature second stage cutoff prevented third stage operation. Did not reach orbit.	9.98 kg (21.96 lb)
1958	July 26	US	Explorer 4	Juno I	Success	Expanded data set of previous Explorer missions and collected data from Argus high-altitude nuclear explosions.	11.7 kg (25.8 lb)
1958	August 17	US	Pioneer 0	Thor-Able 1	Failure	Failed to orbit. First stage engine failure caused explosion at T+77 seconds.	38 kg (84 lb)
1958	August 24	US	Explorer 5	Juno I	Failure	On-board instruments damaged on first stage separation. Failed to orbit.	11.7 kg (25.8 lb)
1958	September 26	US	Vanguard 2D	Vanguard SLV-3	Failure	Second stage under-performed, lacking only ~76 m/s (~250 fps) required to achieve orbit.	10.6 kg (23.3 lb)
1958	October 11	US	Pioneer 1	Thor-Able 1	Partial success	First spacecraft launched by NASA. Studied Earth's magnetic fields. Third stage provided insufficient thrust to reach the Moon, leaving it sub-orbital.	38 kg (84 lb)
1958	October 22	US	Beacon 1	Juno I	Failure	A thin plastic sphere (12-feet in diameter) intended to study atmosphere density. Payload dropped due to rotational vibrations.	4.2 kg (9.2 lb)
1958	November 8	US	Pioneer 2	Thor-Able 1	Failure	Briefly provided further data on Earth's magnetic field. Third stage provided insufficient thrust to reach the vicinity of the Moon.	38 kg (83 lb)
1958	December 6	US	Pioneer 3	Juno II	Partial success	Did not reach the Moon as intended, but discovered a second radiation belt around Earth.	5.9 kg (13.0 lb)
1959	January 2	USSR	Luna 1	Luna	Partial success	The first spacecraft to reach the vicinity of the Moon, and the first spacecraft to be placed in heliocentric orbit.	361 kg (794.2 lb)
1959	January 21	US	Discoverer Zero	Thor-Agena A	Failure	Accessory rockets ignited on pad during fueling. Part of Corona satellite development program. Upper stage consisted entirely of dummy components.	618 kg (1362.5 lb)
1959	February 17	US	Vanguard 2E	Vanguard SLV-4	Success	Vanguard 2. Measured cloud cover. First attempted photo of Earth from a satellite; precession motion resulted in difficulty interpreting data (see first images of Earth from space).	10.8 kg (23.7 lb)
1959	February 28	US	Discoverer 1	Thor-Agena A	Success	Reached orbit with an apogee of 605 miles and a perigee of 99 miles. First spacecraft placed in polar orbit. Part of Corona satellite development program.	618 kg (1362.5 lb)
1959	March 3	US	Pioneer 4	Juno II	Success	Passed within 60,030 km (37,300 mi) of the Moon into a heliocentric orbit, returning excellent radiation data.	6.1 kg (13.4 lb)
1959	April 13	US	Vanguard 3A	Vanguard SLV-5	Failure	Failed to orbit. Second stage hydraulics failure led to loss of control, damaged at launch. Two spheres included as payload.	10.3 kg (22.7 lb)
1959	April 13	US	Discoverer 2	Thor-Agena A	Success	Successful orbit, first satellite to be stabilized in orbit in all 3 axes. Recovery capsule ejected early, landed near Spitzbergen and was not recovered. Part of Corona satellite development program.	784 kg (1728 lb)
1959	June 3	US	Discoverer 3	Thor-Agena A	Failure	Failed to reach orbit. Agena stage failed to produce thrust. Part of Corona satellite development program. Cover story was a biomedical study of 4 live mice onboard.	843 kg (1858 lb)
1959	June 22	US	Vanguard 3B	Vanguard SLV-6	Failure	Failed to orbit. Second stage exploded due to stuck helium vent valve. Intended to measure weather effects related to solar-Earth heating processes.	10.3 kg (22.7 lb)
1959	June 25	US	Discoverer 4	Thor-Agena A	Failure	Failed to reach orbit. Agena stage failed to produce thrust. Part of Corona satellite development program. First satellite to contain full Corona optics. Also known as Corona 9001.	870 kg (1920 lb)
1959	July 16	US	Explorer S-1	Juno II	Failure	Did not achieve orbit. Guidance system power malfunction. Destroyed by range safety officer at T+5.5s.	41.5 kg (91.3 lb)
1959	August 7	US	Explorer 6	Thor-Able 3	Success	Included instruments to study particles and meteorology.	64.4 kg (141.7 lb)
1959	August 13	US	Discoverer 5	Thor-Agena A	Partial success	Successfully reached 193 kilometers (120 mi) x 353 kilometers (219 mi) polar orbit. Camera failed after first orbit. Recovery capsule boosted into higher orbit and was not recovered. Also known as Corona 9002	870 kg (1920 lb)
1959	August 14	US	Beacon 2	Juno II	Failure	Premature cutoff of first stage caused upper stage malfunction.	4.5 kg (9.9 lb)
1959	August 19	US	Discoverer 6	Thor-Agena A	Partial success	Successfully reached 212 kilometers (132 mi) x 848 kilometers (527 mi) polar orbit. Camera failed after second orbit. Recovery capsule was not recovered. Also known as Corona 9003	870 kg (1920 lb)
1959	September 12	USSR	Luna 2	Luna	Success	The first spacecraft to reach the surface of the Moon, and the first human-made object to land on another celestial body.	390.2 kg (858.4 lb)
1959	September 18	US	Vanguard 3	Vanguard TV-4BU	Success	Incorporated Allegany Ballistics Laboratory X248 A2 as third stage. Solar-powered sphere measured radiation belts and micrometeorite impacts.	22.7 kg (50.0 lb)
1959	October 4	USSR	Luna 3	Luna	Success	The first mission to photograph the far side of the Moon.	278.5 kg (614 lb)
1959	October 13	US	Explorer 7	Juno II	Success	Provided data on energetic particles, radiation, and magnetic storms. Also recorded the first micrometeorite penetration of a sensor.	41.5 kg (69.4 lb)
1959	November 7	US	Discoverer 7	Thor-Agena A	Partial success	Successfully reached 159 kilometers (99 mi) x 847 kilometers (526 mi) polar orbit. Recovery capsule failed to separate. Also known as Corona 9004	920 kg (2030 lb)
1959	November 20	US	Discoverer 8	Thor-Agena A	Partial success	Successfully reached 187 kilometers (116 mi) x 1,679 kilometers (1,043 mi) polar orbit. Film broken during operation. Recovery capsule correctly separated and re-entered. Parachute failed to open and capsule was not recovered. Also known as Corona 9005.	835 kg (1841 lb)
1959	November 26	US	Pioneer P-3	Atlas-Able 20	Failure	Lunar orbiter probe; payload shroud failed at T+45 seconds, resulting in disintegration of upper stages and payload.	168.7 kg (371.1 lb)

=== 1960s ===
Artificial satellites and space probes in the 1960s
Year	Launch date	Origin	Name	Launch vehicle	Target	Status	Description
1960	March 11	US	Pioneer 5	Thor-Able	Sun	Success	Solar monitor. Measured magnetic field phenomena, solar flare particles, and ionization in the interplanetary region
1960	May 15	USSR	Korabl-Sputnik 1	Vostok-L	Earth	Success	First test flight of the Soviet Vostok programme, and the first Vostok spacecraft
1960	April 1	US	TIROS-1	Thor-Able	Earth	Success	TIROS-1 (or TIROS-A) was the first successful low-Earth orbital weather satellite, and the first of a series of Television Infrared Observation Satellites.
1960	August 19	USSR	Korabl-Sputnik 2	Vostok-L	Earth	Success	First spaceflight to send animals into orbit and return them safely back to Earth
1960	November 3	US	Explorer 8	Juno II	Earth	Partial success	Battery power failed early, and data had to be processed by hand. In spite of this, new information about the ionosphere has been discovered
1961	February 12	USSR	Venera 1	Molniya 8K78	Venus	Partial success	First interplanetary flight, contact lost en route, before it performed the first flyby at another planet.
1961	April 27	US	Explorer 11	Juno II	Earth	Partial success	Was the first space-borne gamma-ray telescope. Limited Battery Power restricted the data collection to the ascension stage.
1961	August 16	US	Explorer 12 (EPE-A)	Thor-Delta A	Earth	Partial success	The spacecraft functioned well until 6 December 1961, when it ceased transmitting data apparently as a result of failures in the power system.
1961	August 23	US	Ranger 1	Atlas-Agena	Moon	Failure	Rocket malfunction left the spacecraft stranded in low Earth orbit.
1961	November 18	US	Ranger 2	Atlas-Agena	Moon	Failure	Booster rocket malfunction trapped spacecraft in low Earth orbit.
1962	January 26	US	Ranger 3	Atlas-Agena	Moon	Failure	NASA's first attempt to land a spacecraft on the Moon. A series of malfunctions sent spacecraft hurtling past the Moon.
1962	April 23	US	Ranger 4	Atlas-Agena	Moon	Partial failure	Was the first U.S. spacecraft to reach another celestial body. Failure in the onboard computer prevented it from carrying out its scientific objectives. First spacecraft to impact the far side of the Moon.
1962	April 26	UK	Ariel 1	Thor-Delta	Earth	Success	First British satellite in space (on American rocket)
1962	July 10	US	Telstar 1	Thor-Delta	Earth	Success	Communication satellite
1962	July 22	US	Mariner 1	Atlas-Agena	Venus	Failure	Software related guidance system failure, range safety officer ordered destroyed after 294.5 seconds after launch.
1962	August 27	US	Mariner 2	Atlas-Agena	Venus	Success	First spacecraft to visit another planet
1962	September 29	Canada	Alouette 1	Thor-Agena	Earth	Success	First Canadian satellite (on American rocket), first satellite not constructed by the US or USSR
1962	October 2	US	Explorer 14 (EPE-B)	Thor-Delta A	Earth	Success	NASA spacecraft instrumented to measure cosmic-ray particles, trapped particles, solar wind protons, and magnetospheric and interplanetary magnetic fields.
1962	October 18	US	Ranger 5	Atlas-Agena	Moon	Failure	Malfunction in the spacecraft's batteries caused them to drain after 8 hours, leaving it inoperable.
1963	February 14	US	Syncom 1	Delta B	Earth	Failure	Failed to reach desired orbit - went silent seconds after apogee kick motor ignited.
1963	July 26	US	Syncom 2	Delta B	Earth	Success	First successful television broadcast through a geosynchronous satellite.
1963	First pair - October 17	US	Vela 1A and Vela 1B	Atlas-Agena	Earth	Success	Series of satellites to monitor compliance to the 1963 Partial Test Ban Treaty
1964	February 2	US	Ranger 6	Atlas-Agena	Moon	Success	Lunar impactor. Successful impact but power failure resulted in no pictures.
1964	March 27	UK	Ariel 2	Scout X-3	Earth	Success	First Radio Astronomy Satellite (on American rocket)
1964	July 31	US	Ranger 7	Atlas-Agena	Moon	Success	Lunar impactor. Returned pictures until impact.
1964	November 28	US	Mariner 4	Atlas-Agena	Mars	Success	First deep space photographs of another planet and first flyby of Mars
1964	December 15	Italy	San Marco 1	Scout X-4	Earth	Success	First Italian satellite (on American rocket)
1965	February 2	US	Ranger 8	Atlas-Agena	Moon	Success	Lunar impactor. Returned pictures until impact.
1965	February 20	US	Ranger 9	Atlas-Agena	Moon	Success	Lunar impactor. Live TV broadcast until impact.
1965	April 6	US	Intelsat I	Delta D	Earth	Success	First commercial communications satellite in orbit. Was operated off and on until 1990.
1965	November 26	France	Asterix	Diamant A	Earth	Success	First French satellite. First orbital launch outside U.S. and Soviet Union.
1965	November 29	Canada	Alouette 2	Thor-Agena	Earth	Success	Research satellite designed to explore Earth's ionosphere
1965	December 6	France	FR-1	Scout X-4	Earth	Success	First French scientific satellite, designed to explore Earth's ionosphere, plasmasphere and magnetosphere.
1965	December 16	US	Pioneer 6	Delta E	Sun	Success	A series of solar-orbiting, spin-stabilized, solar-cell and battery-powered satellites designed to obtain measurements on a continuing basis of interplanetary phenomena from widely separated points in space.
1966	January 31	USSR	Luna 9	Molniya M	Moon	Success	First spacecraft to achieve a soft landing on the Moon, or any planetary body other than Earth, and to transmit photographic data to Earth from the surface of another planetary body.
1966	February 17	France	Diapason	Diamant A	Earth	Success	Earth measurement by doppler radio measure
1966	June 2	US	Surveyor 1	Atlas-Centaur	Moon	Success	First US soft landing; Surveyor program performed various tests in support of forthcoming crewed landings.
1966	July 1	US	Explorer 33	Delta E1	Earth	Partial success	Was intended to orbit the Moon but instead orbited the Earth. Explored solar winds, interplanetary plasma, and solar X-rays.
1966	August 10	US	Lunar Orbiter 1	Atlas SLV-3 Agena-D	Moon	Success	First US spacecraft to orbit the Moon. Designed to photograph smooth areas of the lunar surface for selecting landing sites.
1966	August 17	US	Pioneer 7	Delta E1	Sun	Success	A series of solar-orbiting, spin-stabilized, solar-cell and battery-powered satellites designed to obtain measurements on a continuing basis of interplanetary phenomena from widely separated points in space.
1966	September 20	US	Surveyor 2	Atlas LV-3C Centaur-D	Moon	Failure	Lunar Lander. A failure in one of its three thrusters caused it to lose control and crash into the Moon.
1966	November 6	US	Lunar Orbiter 2	Atlas SLV-3 Agena-D	Moon	Success	Designed to photograph smooth areas of the lunar surface to identify landing sites.
1967	January 11	US	Intelsat II F-2	Delta E	Earth	Success	Operated for 2 years as a communications satellite. Was deactivated in 1969.
1967	February 8	France	Diadème 1	Diamant A	Earth	Success	Orbit slightly too low, considered a partial failure by the booster team. Earth measurement by doppler radio and laser ranging from the ground.
1967	February 15	France	Diadème 2	Diamant A	Earth	Success	Earth measurement by doppler radio and laser ranging from the ground.
1967	April 17	US	Surveyor 3	Atlas LV-3C Centaur-D	Moon	Success	Second successful lunar surface lander. Conducted experiments to see how the lunar surface would fare against the weight of an Apollo lunar module.
1967	May 5	UK	Ariel 3	Scout A	Earth	Success	First entirely British built satellite
1967	July 14	US	Surveyor 4	Atlas LV-3C Centaur-D	Moon	Failure	Despite a perfect flight to the Moon, communications was lost 2.5 minutes prior to landing. NASA concluded the spacecraft may have exploded.
1967	September 8	US	Surveyor 5	Atlas SLV-3 Agena-D	Moon	Success	Lunar lander. First spacecraft to do a soil analysis of any world. Returned more than 20,000 photos.
1967	November 7	US	Surveyor 6	Atlas SLV-3 Agena-D	Moon	Success	Lunar lander. First spacecraft to be launched from the surface of the Moon. It lifted itself to a height of about 3 meters.
1967	November 29	Australia	WRESAT	Sparta	Earth	Success	First Australian satellite (on American rocket) launched from Woomera, Australia. Third nation to launch a satellite from its own soil.
1967	December 13	US	Pioneer 8	Delta E1	Sun	Success	A series of solar-orbiting, spin-stabilized, solar-cell and battery-powered satellites designed to obtain measurements on a continuing basis of interplanetary phenomena from widely separated points in space.
1968	January 7	US	Surveyor 7	Atlas SLV-3 Agena-D	Moon	Success	Lunar lander. Only spacecraft in the series to land in the lunar highland region and had the most extensive set of instruments.
1968	November 8	US	Pioneer 9	Delta E1	Sun	Success	A series of solar-orbiting, spin-stabilized, solar-cell and battery-powered satellites designed to obtain measurements on a continuing basis of interplanetary phenomena from widely separated points in space.
1969	January 30	Canada	ISIS 1	Delta E1	Earth	Success	International Satellites for Ionospheric Studies (ISIS)
1969	February 25	US	Mariner 6	Atlas SLV-3D Agena-D1A	Mars	Success	Mars probe attempting to study the surface and atmosphere of Mars during close flybys to establish a basis for further investigations.
1969	March 27	US	Mariner 7	Atlas SLV-3D Agena-D1A	Mars	Success	Mars probe attempting to study the surface and atmosphere of Mars during close flybys to establish a basis for further investigations.
1969	November 8	West Germany	Azur / (GRS A) (German Research Satellite)	Scout B S169C	Earth	Success	The scientific mission was to: scan the energy spectra of inner zone protons and electrons; measure the fluxes of electrons of energy greater than 40 keV that are parallel, anti-parallel, and perpendicular to the magnetic lines of force over the auroral zone, and measure associated optical emission; and record solar protons on alert.

=== 1970s ===
Artificial satellites and space probes in the 1970s
Year	Launch date	Origin	Name	Target	Status	Description
1970	February 11	Japan	Ohsumi	Earth	Success	First Japanese satellite. Japan became the fourth nation after the USSR, USA and France to successfully put an artificial satellite into orbit on its own.
1970	March 10	West Germany	DIAL-WIKA	Earth	Success	Second German satellite. Launch by a French Diamant B from Kourou
1970	April 24	China	Dong Fang Hong I	Earth	Success	First Chinese satellite
1970	August 7	USSR	Venera 7	Venus	Success	First successful landing of a spacecraft on another planet
1970	September 2	UK	Orba	Earth	Failure	Second stage of rocket shutdown 13 seconds early
1970	September 12	USSR	Luna 16	Moon	Success	Lander is the first automated return of samples from the Moon
1970	October 20	USSR	Zond 8	Moon	Success	Flyby
1970	November 10	USSR	Luna 17/Lunokhod 1	Moon	Success	Lander/rover is the first automated surface exploration of the Moon
1970	December 12	US	Uhuru	Earth	Success	First dedicated X-ray astronomy satellite
1970	December 12	France	PEOLE	Earth	Success	First French communication satellite.
1971	April 15	France	Tournesol	Earth	Success	First French satellite with active attitude control. Hydrogen measurement.
1971	April 1	Canada	ISIS 2	Earth	Success	
1971	May 9	US	Mariner 8	Mars	Failure	Orbiter. Lost due to launch failure.
1971	May 10	USSR	Cosmos 419	Mars	Failure	Probe
1971	May 19	USSR	Mars 2	Mars	Failure	Orbiter and lander, created the first human artifact on Mars
1971	May 28	USSR	Mars 3	Mars	Success	Orbiter and lander, first successful landing on Mars
1971	May 30	US	Mariner 9	Mars	Success	Orbiter, first pictures of Mars' moons (Phobos and Deimos) taken
1971	September 2	USSR	Luna 18	Moon	Failure	Lander
1971	September 28	USSR	Luna 19	Moon	Success	Orbiter
1971	September 28	Japan	Shinsei	Earth	Partial success	First Japanese science satellite
1971	October 28	UK	Prospero X-3	Earth	Success	Satellite, first satellite launched by Britain using a British rocket
1971	December 5	France	Polaire	Earth	Failure	Second stage explosion
1971	December 11	UK	Ariel 4	Earth	Success	
1972	February 17	USSR	Luna 20	Moon	Success	Lander
1972	March 3	US	Pioneer 10	Jupiter	Success	First spacecraft to encounter Jupiter
1972	March 27	USSR	Venera 8	Venus	Success	Lander
1972	August 21	US/UK	Copernicus – Orbiting Astronomical Observatory-3	Earth	Success	
1973	January 8/11	USSR	Luna 21/Lunokhod 2	Moon	Success	Lander/rover
1973	April 6	US	Pioneer 11	Jupiter/Saturn	Success	First spacecraft to encounter Saturn
1973	May 21	France	Castor/Pollux	Earth	Failure	Reached orbit but the fairing failed to deploy, failing the launch
1973	June 10	US	Explorer 49	Sun	Success	Solar probe
1973	July 21	USSR	Mars 4	Mars	Failure	Orbiter
1973	July 25	USSR	Mars 5	Mars	Success	Orbiter
1973	August 5	USSR	Mars 6	Mars	Failure	Orbiter and lander
1973	August 9	USSR	Mars 7	Mars	Failure	Orbiter and lander
1973	November 3	US	Mariner 10	Venus/Mercury	Success	It passed by and photographed Mercury, also was the first dual planet probe
1974	May 29	USSR	Luna 22	Moon	Success	Orbiter
1974	August 30	Netherlands/US	Astronomische Nederlandse Satelliet (ANS)	Earth	Success	Discovered X-ray bursts, first Dutch satellite (with US contributions)
1974	October 15	UK	Ariel 5	Earth	Success	X-ray satellite
1974	October 28	USSR	Luna 23	Moon	Failure	Probe
1974	December 10	West Germany	Helios 1	Sun	Success	Solar probe
1975	February 6	France	Starlette	Earth	Success	Laser reflector for Earth-based measurement
1975	April 19	India	Aryabhata	Earth	Success	Launched by USSR, the first Indian satellite
1975	May 17	France	Castor/Pollux	Earth	Success	Second launch. Castor tested a new accelerometer, Pollux tested hydrazine based thrusters
1975	June 8	USSR	Venera 9	Venus	Success	Returns the first pictures of the surface of Venus
1975	June 14	USSR	Venera 10	Venus	Success	Orbiter and lander
1975	August 20	US	Viking 1	Mars	Success	Orbiter and lander; lands on Mars 1976
1975	September 9	US	Viking 2	Mars	Success	Orbiter and lander; lands on Mars 1976
1975	September 27	France	Aura	Earth	Success	Far-ultraviolet measurement of the Sun. Last launch of the Diamant rocket.
1976	January 15	West Germany	Helios 2	Sun	Success	Solar probe
1976	January 17	Canada/US/Europe	Communications Technology Satellite	Earth	Success	Prototype for testing direct broadcast satellite television on the K_{u} band
1976	July 9	Indonesia	Palapa A1	Earth	Success	Launched by US, The First Indonesian GEO Satellite for domestic Communication
1976	August 9	USSR	Luna 24	Moon	Success	Lander
1977	August 12	US	HEAO-1	Earth	Success	X-ray satellite
1977	August 20	US	Voyager 2	Jupiter/Saturn/ Uranus/Neptune	Success	First spacecraft to encounter Uranus and Neptune
1977	September 5	US	Voyager 1	Jupiter/Saturn	Success	First spacecraft to enter interstellar space
1977	September 18	USSR	Kosmos 954	Earth	Success	Reconnaissance satellites
1978	May 20	US	Pioneer Venus 1	Venus	Success	Orbiter
1978	August 8	US	Pioneer Venus 2	Venus	Success	Atmospheric probe
1978	September 9	USSR	Venera 11	Venus	Success	Flyby and lander
1978	September 14	USSR	Venera 12	Venus	Success	Flyby and lander
1978	October 24	Czechoslovakia	Magion 1	Earth	Success	First satellite for Czechoslovakia
1978	November 13	US	HEAO-2	Earth	Success	First X-ray photographs of astronomical objects
1979	February 21	Japan	Hakucho	Earth	Success	X-ray satellite
1979	June 2	UK	Ariel 6	Earth	Success	Cosmic-ray and X-ray satellite
1979	June 7	India	Bhaskara-1	Earth	Success	Launched by ISRO (First successfully launched Indian low orbit Earth Observation Satellite)
1979	August 10	India	Rohini Technology Payload	Earth	Failure	Launched by ISRO. Purpose was to monitor flight performance of SLV but a faulty valve caused vehicle to crash into the Bay of Bengal 317 seconds after launch.

=== 1980s ===
Artificial satellites and space probes in the 1980s
Year	Origin	Name	Target	Status	Description
1980	US	Solar Maximum Mission	Sun	Failure	Solar Maximum Mission solar probe succeeded after being repaired in Earth orbit
1981	India	Bhaskara-2	Earth	Success	Bhaskara-2 satellite; launched on Russian Kosmos-3M rocket for ISRO
1981	USSR	Venera 13	Venus	Success	Venera 13 launched, it returned the first colour pictures of the surface of Venus
1981	USSR	Venera 14	Venus	Success	Venera 14 flyby and lander
1981	Bulgaria	Bulgaria 1300	Earth	Success	Bulgaria 1300, polar research mission, was Bulgaria's first artificial satellite; launched by the Soviet Union
1983	USSR	Venera 15	Venus	Success	Venera 15 orbiter
1983	USSR	Venera 16	Venus	Success	Venera 16 orbiter
1983	Europe	EXOSAT	Earth	Success	Launch of the EXOSAT X-ray satellite
1983	Japan	Tenma	Earth	Success	Launch of the Tenma X-ray satellite (ASTRO-B)
1983	US / Netherlands / UK	IRAS	Earth	Success	Launch of the IRAS satellite
1984	USSR	Vega 1	Venus/Halley's Comet	Success	Vega 1 flyby, atmospheric probe and lander
1984	USSR	Vega 2	Venus/Halley's Comet	Success	Vega 2 flyby, atmospheric probe and lander
1985	Japan	Sakigake	Halley's Comet	Success	Sakigake flyby, Japan's first interplanetary spacecraft
1985	Japan	Suisei	Halley's Comet	Success	Suisei flyby
1985	Mexico	Morelos I	Earth	Success	Morelos I, the first Mexican satellite
1986	Europe	Giotto	Halley's Comet	Success	Giotto flyby
1986	US	Voyager 2	Uranus	Success	Voyager 2 sent back images of Uranus and its system
1987	Japan	Ginga	Earth	Success	Launch of the Ginga X-ray satellite (ASTRO-C)
1988	USSR	Phobos 1	Mars	Failure	Phobos 1 orbiter and lander
1988	USSR	Phobos 2	Mars	Failure	Phobos 2 flyby and lander
1988	Israel	Ofeq 1	Earth	Success	Ofeq 1 first Israeli satellite, first satellite to be launched in retrograde orbit
1989	US	Magellan	Venus	Success	Magellan orbiter launched which mapped 99 percent of the surface of Venus (300 m resolution)
1989	US / West Germany	Galileo	Venus/Earth/Moon/Gaspra/Ida/Jupiter	Success	Galileo flyby, orbiter and atmospheric probe
1989	US	Voyager 2	Neptune	Success	Voyager 2 sent back images of Neptune and its system
1989	Europe	Hipparcos	Earth	Success	Launch of the Hipparcos satellite
1989	US	COBE	Earth	Success	Launch of the COBE satellite
1989	USSR	Granat	Earth	Success	Launch of the Granat gamma-ray and X-ray satellite

=== 1990s ===
Artificial satellites and space probes in the 1990s
Year	Origin	Name	Target	Status	Description
1990	US/Europe	Ulysses	Sun	Success	Ulysses solar flyby
1990	Japan	Hiten	Moon	Success	Hiten probe, this was the first non-United States or USSR probe to reach the Moon
1990	US/Europe	Hubble Space Telescope	Earth	Success	Launch of the Hubble Space Telescope
1990	Pakistan	Badr-1	Earth	Success	Launch of Badr-1 Pakistan 1st communication satellite
1990	Germany	ROSAT	Earth	Success	Launch of the ROSAT X-ray satellite to conduct the first imaging X-ray sky survey
1991	Japan	Yohkoh	Sun	Success	Yohkoh solar probe
1991	US	Compton Gamma-Ray Observatory	Earth	Success	Launch of the Compton Gamma-Ray Observatory satellite
1992	US	Mars Observer	Mars	Failure	Mars Observer orbiter
1993	Japan	ASCA	Earth	Success	Launch of the ASCA (ASTRO-D) X-ray satellite
1993	Brazil	INPE	Earth	Success	Launch of the SCD-1, the oldest earth observation equipment still in operation.
1994	US	Clementine	Moon	Success	Clementine orbiter mapped the surface of the Moon (resolution 125–150 m) and allowed the first accurate relief map of the Moon to be generated
1994	Turkey	Türksat 1B	Earth	Success	Türksat 1B, First Turkish communications satellite
1995	Mexico	Unamsat 1	Earth	Failure	Unamsat 1, First UNAM built orbiter
1995	Ukraine	Sich-1	Earth	Success	Sich-1 launched, first Ukrainian-built satellite
1995	Europe	ISO	Earth	Success	Launch of the Infrared Space Observatory
1995	Europe/US	SOHO	Sun	Success	SOHO solar probe
1996	US	NEAR Shoemaker	433 Eros	Success	NEAR Shoemaker asteroid flybys/orbiter/lander
1996	Turkey	Türksat 1C	Earth	Success	Türksat 1C, Second Turkish communications satellite
1996	US	Mars Global Surveyor	Mars	Success	Mars Global Surveyor orbiter
1996	US	Mars Pathfinder	Mars	Success	Mars Pathfinder, the first automated surface exploration of another planet
1996	Russia	Mars 96	Mars	Failure	Mars 96 orbiter and lander
1996	Argentina	SAC-B	Earth	Failure	Sac-B Orbiter
1997	US/Europe	Cassini-Huygens	Saturn and Titan	Success	Cassini-Huygens arrived in orbit on July 1, 2004, landed on Titan January 14, 2005
1997	Argentina	Nahuel 1A	Earth	Success	Nahuel 1A First Argentine satellite - geostationary communications satellites
1998	North Korea	Kwangmyŏngsŏng-1	Earth	Unknown	Claimed launch of Kwangmyŏngsŏng-1 by North Korea though no independent source was able to verify its existence
1998	US	Lunar Prospector	Moon	Success	Lunar Prospector orbiter
1998	Japan	Nozomi	Mars	Failure	Nozomi (Planet B) orbiter, the first Japanese spacecraft to reach another planet
1998	US	Mars Climate Orbiter	Mars	Failure	Mars Climate Orbiter
1998	Argentina / US	SAC-A	Earth	Success	Sac-A Orbiter
1999	US	Mars Polar Lander	Mars	Failure	Mars Polar Lander
1999	US	Deep Space 2	Mars	Failure	Deep Space 2 (DS2) penetrators
1999	US	Chandra	Earth	Success	Launch of the Chandra X-ray Observatory
1999	Europe	XMM-Newton	Earth	Success	Launch of the X-Ray Multi-Mirror Mission, XMM-Newton

=== 2000s ===
Artificial satellites and space probes in 2000's
Year	Origin	Name	Target	Status	Description
2000	UK	SNAP-1	Earth	Success	SNAP-1 robotic camera enabling images to be sent to other spacecraft orbiting the Earth
2000	Argentina	SAC-C	Earth	Success	SAC-C Orbiter
2001	Turkey	Türksat 2A	Earth	Success	Türksat 2A, third Turkish communications satellite
2001	US	Genesis	Sun	Partial success	Genesis solar wind sample crash-landed on return
2001	US	WMAP	Earth	Success	Wilkinson Microwave Anisotropy Probe (WMAP) performs cosmological observations.
2001	US	Mars Odyssey	Mars	Success	Mars Odyssey
2001	Europe	PROBA-1	Earth	Success	PROBA-1 Small satellite to observe the Earth (first Belgian Satellite)
2003	Canada	MOST	Earth	Success	MOST the smallest space telescope in orbit.
2003	Turkey	BİLSAT	Earth	Success	BİLSAT, Turkey's first earth observation satellite
2002	US	CONTOUR	Comet Encke	Failure	CONTOUR launched, but lost during early trajectory insertion.
2002	Europe/Russia/US	INTEGRAL	Earth	Success	Launch of the INTEGRAL gamma-ray satellite.
2003	Europe	SMART-1	Moon	Success	SMART-1 orbiter
2003	Europe	Mars Express & Beagle 2	Mars	Partial success	Mars Express orbiter (successfully reached orbit) and failed Beagle 2 lander
2003	US	Mars Exploration Rover	Mars	Success	Mars Exploration Rovers successful launches, Spirit successfully landed, Opportunity successfully landed
2003	UK	UK-DMC	Earth	Success	UK-DMC orbiter, part of the Disaster Monitoring Constellation
2003	Japan	Hayabusa	25143 Itokawa	Success	Hayabusa, first sample return from asteroid, returned in 2010
2004	Europe	Rosetta	Comet 67P	Success	Rosetta space probe launched (arrived on comet 67P on November 12, 2014)
2004	US	MESSENGER	Mercury	Success	MESSENGER orbiter launched (in Mercury orbit)
2004	US	Swift	Earth	Success	Launch of the Swift Gamma ray burst observatory.
2005	US	Deep Impact	Comet Tempel 1	Success	Deep Impact
2005	Japan	Suzaku	Earth	Partial success	Launch of the Suzaku X-ray observatory (ASTRO-EII)
2005	US	MRO	Mars	Success	Mars Reconnaissance Orbiter
2005	Iran	Sinah-1	Earth	Success	Sinah-1 launched, first Iranian-built satellite
2005	Europe	Venus Express	Venus	Success	Venus Express
2006	US	New Horizons	Pluto	Success	New Horizons launched. On July 14, 2015, New Horizons flew within 7,750 miles (12,472 km) of Pluto.
2006	Japan	Akari	Earth	Success	Launch of the Akari infrared observatory (ASTRO-F)
2006	France/Europe	COROT	Earth	Success	COROT telescope to search for extrasolar planets
2007	US	Phoenix	Mars	Success	Phoenix launched and successfully landed in 2008
2007	Japan	SELENE	Moon	Success	SELENE orbiter and lander
2007	US	Dawn	Vesta/Ceres	Success	Dawn solar powered ion engined probe to 4 Vesta and 1 Ceres.
2007	China	Chang'e-I	Moon	Success	Chang'e-I lunar orbiter
2007	Nigeria	NigComSat-1	Earth	Partial success	NigComSat-1 launched by China, failed after 1 year
2008	Turkey	Türksat 3A	Earth	Success	Türksat 3A, fourth Turkish communications satellite
2008	US	IBEX	Earth	Success	The Interstellar Boundary Explorer (IBEX)'s mission is to study the nature of interactions between solar wind and interstellar medium at the edge of Solar System.
2009	North Korea	Kwangmyŏngsŏng-2	Earth	Failure	Kwangmyŏngsŏng-2 failed to orbit, possibly due to the rocket's third stage not separating properly.
2009	Europe	Planck	L2	Success	Planck
2009	Europe	Herschel	L2	Success	Herschel Space Observatory
2009	Iran	Omid	Earth	Success	Omid launched by Iranian made launcher Safir. First Iranian-launched satellite
2009	US	Kepler	Earth	Success	Kepler launched
2009	Europe	PROBA-2	Earth	Success	PROBA-2 Small satellite to observe the Sun
2009	India	RISAT-2	Earth	Success	RISAT-2 developed by Israel Aerospace Industries, launched by ISRO, India
2009	India	Chandrayaan-1	Moon	Success	Chandrayaan-1 developed and launched by ISRO, India. First discovery of Lunar Water.
2009	UK	UK-DMC 2	Earth	Success	UK-DMC 2 orbiter, successor to UK-DMC part of the Disaster Monitoring Constellation

=== 2010s ===
Artificial satellites and space probes in the 2010s
Year	Origin	Name	Target	Status	Description
2010	Japan	Akatsuki	Venus	Partial success	Akatsuki orbiter, first Japanese spacecraft to orbit another planet (2015)
2010	Japan	IKAROS	Venus	Success	IKAROS, first solar-sail spacecraft
2010	China	Chang'e-2	Moon	Success	Chang'e-2 lunar orbiter/impacter
2011	Turkey	RASAT	Earth	Success	Turkey's after BİLSAT, second earth observation satellite. RASAT, design and production made in Turkey is the first observation satellite.
2011	Russia	Spektr-R	Earth	Success	Launch of the Spektr-R radio telescope
2011	US	Juno	Jupiter	Success	Juno
2011	Russia	Fobos-Grunt	Mars	Failure	Fobos-Grunt lander and sample return
2011	Nigeria	NigComSat-1	Earth	Success	NigComSat-1 replacement launched by China
2011	Taiwan / Singapore	ST-2	Earth	Success	ST-2 replacement launched by Taiwan and Singapore
2011	Argentina / US	SAC-D	Earth	Success	SAC-D Orbiter
2012	Iran	Navid	Earth	Success	Navid Earth-watching satellite
2012	US	MSL	Mars	Success	Mars Science Laboratory with Curiosity rover—orbit and landed
2012	North Korea	Kwangmyŏngsŏng-3	Earth	Success	Kwangmyŏngsŏng-3 Unit 2, first successful North Korean orbital rocket launch after the first unit exploded shortly after launch.
2012	Poland	PW-Sat	Earth	Success	PW-Sat, first Polish satellite
2013	South Korea	STSAT-2C	Earth	Success	STSAT-2C, first successful South Korean orbital rocket launch
2013	Canada	NEOSSat	Earth	Success	NEOSSat, monitoring near-Earth objects
2013	Canada	Sapphire	Earth	Success	Sapphire, military space surveillance
2013	Ecuador	NEE 01 Pegaso	Earth	Success	NEE-01 Pegaso, Ecuador's first satellite
2013	Estonia	ESTCube-1	Earth	Success	ESTCube-1, Estonia's first satellite
2013	Europe	PROBA-V	Earth	Success	PROBA-V, small satellite to monitor the vegetation of the Earth
2013	UK	STRaND-1	Earth	Success	STRaND-1, first smartphone-operated satellite to be launched and dubbed the world's first "phonesat"
2013	Japan	Hisaki	Earth	Success	Hisaki planetary atmosphere observatory
2013	Canada	CASSIOPE	Earth	Success	CASSIOPE, ionosphere research and communication satellite
2013	India	MOM	Mars	Success	MOM is India's first interplanetary mission to Mars. First Asian nation to reach Mars.
2013	US	MAVEN	Mars	Success	MAVEN orbiter
2013	Poland	Lem	Earth	Success	Lem, First Polish scientific satellite
2014	Lithuania	LitSat1/LituanicaSAT-1	Earth	Success	LitSat-1 and LituanicaSAT-1, first Lithuanian satellites
2014	Turkey	TÜRKSAT 4A	Earth	Success	TÜRKSAT 4A, Turkey's fifth communication satellite.
2014	Europe	Rosetta / Philae	Comet 67P	Partial success	Rosetta and Philae, Third comet landing at unintended site in suboptimal orientation due to failure of surface anchoring system
2014	Poland	Heweliusz	Earth	Success	Heweliusz, Second Polish scientific satellite
2014	Japan	Hayabusa2	162173 Ryugu	Success	Hayabusa2, second Japanese asteroid sample return spacecraft
2014	Japan	PROCYON	2000 DP107	Partial failure	PROCYON deep space probe
2015	US	DSCOVR	Earth-Sun L1	Success	DSCOVR, Earth and space weather
2015	India	Astrosat	Earth	Success	Astrosat, Space observatory
2015	Turkey	TÜRKSAT 4B	Earth	Success	TÜRKSAT 4B, Turkey's sixth communication satellite.
2016	European Union / Russia	ExoMars / Schiaparelli	Mars	Partial success	ExoMars Trace Gas Orbiter, Trace Gas Orbiter in orbit; Schiaparelli lander crashed
2016	Canada	M3MSat	Earth	Success	M3MSat, maritime monitoring and communication satellite
2016	US	OSIRIS-REx	Earth	En route	OSIRIS-REx, first American asteroid sample return spacecraft
2017	Brazil	SGDC-1	Earth	Success	SGDC-1, communication satellite
2018	US	Tesla Roadster	Heliocentric orbit	Success	Elon Musk's Tesla Roadster, dummy payload for the February 2018 Falcon Heavy test flight and is now an artificial satellite of the Sun
2018	China	Queqiao	Moon	Success	First relay satellite for far side of the Moon.
2018	US France Germany	InSight	Mars	Success	InSight, Mars lander for planetary information
2018	European Union/Japan	BepiColombo	Mercury	En route	BepiColombo, two orbiters to study the magnetic field, magnetosphere, and both interior and surface structure of Mercury. Final mission of the Horizon 2000+ programme
2018	US	Parker Solar Probe	Sun	En route	Parker Solar Probe, first spacecraft to visit the outer corona of the Sun
2018	China	Chang'e 4	Moon	Success	Chang'e 4, first spacecraft to soft-land on the lunar far side.
2019	Egypt	NARSSCube-2	Earth	Success	NARSSCube-2, Egypt's first domestically built satellite
2019	Israel	Beresheet	Moon	Failure	Beresheet, first private space probe and moon lander, crashed
2019	Russia / Germany	Spektr-RG	Earth-Sun L2	Success	Launch of the Spektr-RG X-ray observatory
2019	India	Chandrayaan-2	Moon	Partial success	Chandrayaan-2, orbiter achieved orbit, but lander and rover module hit into the Moon's surface and crashed.
2019	Ethiopia	ETRSS-1	Earth	Success	ETRSS-1, first Ethiopian satellite; launched on China's Long March 4B rocket.

=== 2020s ===
Artificial satellites and space probes in the 2020s
Year	Origin	Name	Target	Status	Description
2020	Turkey	TÜRKSAT 5A	Earth	Success	TÜRKSAT 5A, Turkey's seventh communication satellite launched with SpaceX's Falcon 9 rocket.
2020	European Union	SolO	Sun	En route	Solar Orbiter is an ESA's Sun-observing satellite.
2020	US	Mars 2020	Mars	Operational	Perseverance, JPL's Mars rover. It was launched on July 30 with Atlas V rocket, and landed on February 18, 2021, together with the small Ingenuity helicopter that was deployed on April 4, 2021.
2020	UAE	Hope	Mars	Success	Hope satellite is the United Arab Emirates Space Agency's uncrewed space research project on Mars. It was launched with Japanese H-IIA rocket on 19 July and reached Mars on 9 February 2021.
2020	China	Tianwen-1	Mars	Success	Mission containing an orbiter, deployable and remote cameras, lander and Zhurong rover. This is China's 2nd uncrewed space research project on Mars. It was launched with Long March 5 rocket on 23 July and the orbiter, lander and rover entered Mars orbit on 10 February 2021. The rover and lander landed on 14 May with rover deployment on 22 April 2021 and dropped a remote selfie camera on Mars on 1 June 2021 and while a deployable camera made a flyby around 10 February 2021 and another deployable camera was released into Mars orbit on 31 December 2021.
2020	China	Chang'e 5	Moon	Success	Orbiter, Returner, Ascent Stage, Lander configuration mission, China's first automated return of samples from the Moon. orbiter visited L1 and made a lunar flyby.
2021	US	Lucy	two main belt asteroids as well as six Jupiter trojans	En route	NASA probe that will complete a 12-year journey to nine different asteroids, visiting two main belt asteroids as well as six Jupiter trojans, asteroids which share Jupiter's orbit around the Sun, orbiting either ahead of or behind the planet. All target encounters will be fly-by encounters. It was launched on October 16, 2021, on the 401 variant of Atlas V and has yet to study a trojan asteroid.
2021	Brazil	Amazônia-1	Earth	Success	Amazônia-1 is the first Earth observation satellite developed by Brazil, helped by Argentina's INVAP, who provided the main computer, attitude controls and sensors, and the training of Brazilian engineers,[8] and launched at 04:54:00 UTC (10:24:00 IST) on 28 February 2021.
2021	US	DART	a Binary 65803 Didymos asteroid system	Success	Double Asteroid Redirection Test, NASA's first mission to test planetary defense. Its uses involves test this technique by kinetically impacting the spacecraft to produce a small change in its orbital period. It was launched on November 24 with Falcon 9 rocket. Accompanying the mission is LICIACube cubesat, a flyby mission that recorded the impact and its aftermaths.
2021	Italy	LICIACube	a Binary 65803 Didymos asteroid system	Success	LICIACube, Light Italian Cubesat for Imaging of Asteroids, is the first Agenzia Spaziale Italiana's interplanetary mission. Ideated, designed, integrated and operated entirely in Italy, it has been the witness of the first real-scale planetary defense test performed by Double Asteroid Redirection Test. LICIACube is the smallest human-made object that successfully performed a flyby of a Small Solar System body. It has been deployed two weeks before DART's impact.
2021	US	IXPE	Earth	Success	Imaging X-ray Polarimetry Explorer, NASA's new X-ray observatory. It was launched on December 8 with Falcon 9 rocket.
2021	Turkey	TÜRKSAT 5B	Earth	Success	TÜRKSAT 5B, Turkey's eighth communication satellite launched with SpaceX's Falcon 9 rocket.
2021	US / European Union / Canada	James Webb Space Telescope	Earth-Sun L_{2} point	Success	James Webb Space Telescope (JWST), NASA, ESA and CSA's joint project for a space telescope. It was launched on December 25 with Ariane 5 ECA rocket to Earth-Moon L_{2} point.
2022	US	CAPSTONE	Near-rectilinear halo orbit (NRHO) of Moon	Operational	CAPSTONE, Lunar orbiting CubeSat that will test and verify the calculated orbital stability planned for the Gateway space station. It was launched with Rocket Lab Electron rocket.
2022	US	Voyager 1 and Voyager 2	None	None	In May, NASA reports that the Voyager 1 spacecraft, the farthest human-made object, is sending data that does not reflect what is happening on board with the antenna apparently remaining in its prescribed orientation to Earth. In June, it was reported that NASA is preparing to power down the two Voyager spacecraft in the hope of using the remaining power to extend their operation to about 2030.
2022	US / South Korea	Danuri (KLPO)	Moon	Operational	South Korea's first lunar orbiter launched by SpaceX's Falcon 9 rocket. Danuri will serve to create topographic map of the lunar surface to pinpoint future landing sites.
2022	US	Artemis 1 Orion MPCV CM-002	Moon	Success	Uncrewed test of the Orion spacecraft in lunar flyby and DRO orbit.
2022	US	CuSP	Heliocentric	Failure	Study particles and magnetic fields.
2022	US	LunIR	Moon	Partial failure	Collect its surface thermography.
2022	US	NEA Scout	Moon/Asteroid	Failure	Solar sail that will flyby a near-Earth asteroid.
2022	US	Team Miles	Heliocentric	Failure	Demonstrate low-thrust plasma propulsion in deep space.
2022	US	BioSentinel	Heliocentric	Success	Contains yeast cards that will be rehydrated in space, designed to detect, measure, and compare the effects of deep space radiation.
2022	US	LunaH-Map	Moon	Failure	Search for evidence of lunar water ice inside permanently shadowed craters using its neutron detector.
2022	US	Lunar IceCube	Moon	Failure	Its infrared spectrometer will detect water and organic compounds in the lunar surface and exosphere.
2022	Italy	ArgoMoon	High Earth Orbit with Lunar Flybys	Success	Image the ICPS and perform deep space Nanotechnology experiments.
2022	Japan	OMOTENASHI	Moon	Failure	Inflatable module attempting to land semi-hard at lunar surface.
2022	Japan	EQUULEUS	Moon/Earth Moon-L_{2}	Success	Image the Earth's plasmasphere, impact craters on the Moon's far side and L2 experiments.
2022	Japan	Hakuto-R Mission 1	Moon	Failure	Lunar landing technology demonstration at Atlas Crater.
2022	US	Lunar Flashlight	Moon	Failure	Lunar Flashlight, Lunar orbiting CubeSat that will explore, locate, and estimate size and composition of water ice deposits on the Moon for future exploitation by robots or humans. It was launched with Hakuto-R mission Mission 1.
2023	European Union	Jupiter Icy Moons Explorer (JUICE)	Jupiter and Ganymede	En route	Mission to study Jupiter's three icy moons Callisto, Europa and Ganymede, eventually orbiting Ganymede as the first spacecraft to orbit a satellite of another planet.
2023	European Union	Euclid	Earth-Sun L_{2} point	Operational	It is ESA's project for a space telescope to study dark matter. It was launched on July 1 with Falcon 9 Block 5 rocket to Earth-Moon L_{2} point.
2023	India	Chandrayaan-3	Moon	Success	It is India's second attempt to land on the Moon and its south pole. Successfully launched on 14 July 2023 on a LVM3 launch vehicle. Successfully landed on 23 August 2023.
2023	Russia	Luna-25	Moon	Failure	It was a lander, launched on 10 August 2023 on Soyuz 2.1b rocket. Crashed on the Moon surface on 19 August 2023.
2023	India	Aditya-L1	Earth-Sun L_{1} point	Operational	It is ISRO's first Sun dedicated scientific mission. It will perform observations of the Solar corona. Successfully launched on 2 September 2023 on a PSLV-XL rocket.
2023	Japan / US	XRISM	Earth	Operational	X-Ray Imaging and Spectroscopy Mission, X-ray space telescope developed by JAXA in partnership with NASA. Successfully launched on 6 September 2023 on a H-IIA launch vehicle.
2023	Japan	SLIM	Moon	Success	Lunar lander developed by JAXA carrying two lunar rovers. Successfully launched on 6 September 2023 on a H-IIA launch vehicle. Successfully landed on 19 January 2024.
2023	US	Psyche	16 Psyche	En route	Asteroid orbiter developed by NASA. Successfully launched on 13 October 2023 on a Falcon Heavy launch vehicle.
2024	India	XPoSat	Earth	Operational	ISRO's mission to study X-ray polarisation. Successfully launched on 1 January 2024 on a PSLV-DL launch vehicle.
2024	USA	Peregrine Mission One	Moon	Failure	Lunar lander developed by Astrobotic Technology and selected as part of NASA's Commercial Lunar Payload Services. Successfully launched on 8 January 2024 on a Vulcan Centaur launch vehicle but landing abandoned due to excessive propellant leak.
2024	China / European Union	Einstein Probe	Earth	Operational	X-ray space telescope developed jointly by CAS and ESA. Successfully launched on 9 January 2024 on a Long March 2C launch vehicle.
2024	USA	IM-1	Moon	Success	Cryogenic-propelled lunar lander developed by Intuitive Machines and selected as part of NASA's Commercial Lunar Payload Services. Successfully launched on 15 February 2024 on a Falcon 9 launch vehicle and landed on its side on 22 February 2024. Accompanied by a university Cubesat lander called EagleCam to send third-party images of landing sequence back to Earth.
2024	China	DRO A/B	Moon	Success	Yuanzheng 1S upper stage failed to deliver spacecraft into correct orbit. The satellites were intended to test Distant retrograde orbit. Tracking data appears to show China is attempting to salvage spacecraft and they appear to have succeeded in reaching their desired orbit.
2024	China	Queqiao-2	Moon	Success	Queqiao-2 relay satellite for far side of the Moon with Tiandu-1 and 2 to test future lunar satellite constellation technologies.
2024	China	Chang'e 6	Moon	Success	Orbiter, Returner, Ascent Stage, Lander, Rover configuration mission, China's first automated return of samples from the far side of the Moon. orbiter visited L2.
2024	Pakistan	ICUBE-Q	Moon	Operational	Piggybacking as the first Pakistani lunar mission along with Chang'e 6.
2024	China / France	Space Variable Objects Monitor	Earth	Operational	X-ray space telescope developed jointly by CNES and CNSA. Successfully launched on 22 June 2024 on a Long March 2C launch vehicle.
2024	EU	Hera	65803 Didymos	En route	European component of AIDA, a NASA-ESA asteroid deflection test cooperation, aimed at studying the effects of the NEO's impact created by NASA's DART mission using 65803 Didymos's moon (Dimorphos) as a target. Successfully launched on 7 October 2024 on a Falcon 9 launch vehicle.
2024	USA	Europa Clipper	Jupiter and Europa	En route	NASA launched the Europa Clipper on 14 October 2024 on a Falcon Heavy launch vehicle, which will study the Jovian moon Europa while in orbit around Jupiter.
2024	EU	PROBA-3	Earth	Operational	solar Coronagraph and Occulter dual satellites developed by ESA. Successfully launched on 5 December 2024 on a Polar Satellite Launch Vehicle.
2025	USA	Blue Ghost M1	Moon	Success	Lunar landing technology demonstration at Mare Crisium. Launched on 15 January 2025 on a Falcon 9 Block 5 launch vehicle with Hakuto-R Mission 2. Landed on 2 March 2025.
2025	Japan	Hakuto-R Mission 2	Moon	Failure	Lunar landing technology demonstration at Mare Frigoris. Launched on 15 January 2025 on a Falcon 9 Block 5 launch vehicle with Blue Ghost M1. Carried a rover named Tenacious to lunar surface. Failed Landing.
2025	USA	IM-2	Moon	Partial failure	Lunar landing technology demonstration at Mare Frigoris. Launched on 27 February 2025 on a Falcon 9 Block 5 launch vehicle with Lunar Trailblazer and Brokkr-2 and landed on its side on 6 March 2025 and the mission ended sooner without conducting useful science and surface operations. Carried AstroAnt, Yaoki, Micro-Nova and MAPP LV1 rovers to lunar surface.
2025	USA	Lunar Trailblazer	Moon	Failure	Lunar orbiter aimed to aid in the understanding of lunar water and the Moon's water cycle. Launched on 27 February 2025 on a Falcon 9 Block 5 launch vehicle with Brokkr-2, Chimera-1 and IM-2.
2025	USA	Brokkr-2	2022 OB5	Failure	Asteroid flyby of a near-Earth asteroid and determine if the asteroid is metallic. Launched on 27 February 2025 on a Falcon 9 Block 5 launch vehicle with Lunar Trailblazer, Chimera-1 and IM-2.
2025	USA	Chimera-1	Moon	Failure	Failed lunar flyby Launched on 27 February 2025 on a Falcon 9 Block 5 launch vehicle with Lunar Trailblazer, Brokkr-2 and IM-2.
2025	China	Tianwen-2	469219 Kamoʻoalewa and 311P/PANSTARRS	En route	Tianwen-2 asteroid orbiter, lander and sample return. Launched on a Long March 3B launch vehicle on 29 May 2025.
2025	USA	Interstellar Mapping and Acceleration Probe	Earth-Sun L_{1} point	Operational	It is NASA's heliophysics mission that simultaneously investigates two important and coupled science topics in the heliosphere: the acceleration of energetic particles and interaction of the solar wind with the local interstellar medium.. It was launched on September 24 with Falcon 9 Block 5 rocket to Earth-Moon L_{1} point with Space Weather Follow On-Lagrange 1 and Carruthers Geocorona Observatory.
2025	USA	Carruthers Geocorona Observatory	Earth-Sun L_{1} point	Operational	It is NASA's project, which will survey ultraviolet light emitted by Earth's outermost atmospheric layer, the exosphere, and geocorona. It was launched on September 24 with Falcon 9 Block 5 rocket to Earth-Moon L_{1} point with Interstellar Mapping and Acceleration Probe and Space Weather Follow On-Lagrange 1.
2025	USA	Space Weather Follow On-Lagrange 1	Earth-Sun L_{1} point	Operational	It is NOAA's mission to monitor signs of solar storms, which may pose harm to Earth's telecommunication network. It was launched on September 24 with Falcon 9 Block 5 rocket to Earth-Moon L_{1} point with Interstellar Mapping and Acceleration Probe and Carruthers Geocorona Observatory.
