= International Charter Space and Major Disasters =

Non-binding multinational alliance

The International Charter Space and Major Disasters (Note: Also written International Charter "Space and Major Disasters" and International Charter: Space and Major Disasters.) is a non-binding charter which provides for the charitable and humanitarian acquisition and transmission of satellite data to relief organizations in the event of major disasters. Initiated by the European Space Agency and the French space agency CNES after the UNISPACE III conference held in Vienna, Austria, in July 1999, it officially came into operation on November 1, 2000, after the Canadian Space Agency signed onto the charter on October 20, 2000. Their space assets were then, respectively, ERS and ENVISAT, SPOT and Formosat, and RADARSAT.

The assorted satellite assets of various corporate, national, and international space agencies and entities provide for humanitarian coverage which is wide albeit contingent. First activated for a landslide in Slovenia in November 2000, the Charter has since brought space assets into play for numerous floods, earthquakes, oil spills, forest fires, tsunamis, major snowfalls, volcanic eruptions, hurricanes and landslides, and furthermore (and unusually) for the search for Malaysia Airlines Flight 370 and for the 2014 West Africa Ebola outbreak. As of 2015, fifteen space agencies are signatories; dozens of satellites are available with image resolutions ranging from 8 kilometres (5 mi) per pixel to about 0.3 metres (1 ft) per pixel. As of August 2018, it had had 579 activations, from 125 countries, and had 17 members, which contributed 34 satellites. It won the prestigious William T. Pecora Award in 2017.

== Successive signatories and satellite assets ==
- United States National Oceanic and Atmospheric Administration (NOAA) – (POES), (GOES) and Indian Space Research Organization (ISRO) (September 2001) – (the Indian Remote Sensing satellite series)
- Argentine Space Agency (CONAE) (July 2003) – (SAC-C)
- February 2005 – Japan Aerospace Exploration Agency (JAXA) – (ALOS)
- ? 2005 – United States Geological Survey (USGS) as part of the U.S. team – (Landsat, Quickbird, GeoEye 1)
- November 2005 – The British space agency BNSC (UK-DMC) with the company DMCii
- May 2007 – China National Space Administration (CNSA) – (the FY, SJ, ZY satellite series)
- ? – DMC International Imaging
- ? – The Algerian space agency Centre National des Techniques Spatiales – (ALSAT-1)
- ? – The Nigerian National Space Research and Development Agency – (NigeriaSat)
- ? – The Turkish space agency TUBITAK – (BILSAT-1)
- ? – The British company BNSC/Surrey Satellite Technology Limited – (UK-DMC)
- ? – The British company BNSC/Qinetiq – (Top Sat)
- 2012 German Aerospace Center (DLR) - (TerraSAR-X, TanDEM-X)
- 2012 Korea Aerospace Research Institute (KARI) - (Arirang 3, 3A, 5)
- 2012 Instituto Nacional de Pesquisas Espaciais, Brazil (INPE)
- 2012 European Organisation for the Exploitation of Meteorological Satellites (EUMETSAT)
- 2013 Russian Space Agency (Resurs-DK No.1, Resurs-P No.1, Kanopus-V, Meteor-M1)
- 2016 Bolivarian Agency for Space Activities (ABAE) – (VRSS-1)

As of 2012, the live satellites and their instrumentalities were: The high resolution and very high resolution radar sensors of ENVISAT (decommissioned in April), RISAT-1, RADARSAT-1 & 2, TerraSAR-X and TanDEM-X; the high resolution and very high resolution optical sensors of SPOT satellites4 & 5, Pleiades, Landsat 5 & 7, PROBA1, UK-DMC 2, KOMPSAT-2, IRS-P5, Resourcesat-2, Oceansat-2, Cartosat-2, IMS-1, and RapidEye; the medium and low resolution optical sensors of POES, GOES, and SAC-C. Furthermore, specific agreements with other entities, including corporations, allow the Charter access to additional products of high and very high resolution from satellites such as the Formosat series, GeoEye, IKONOS, QuickBird, and WorldView.

In 2014, the charter was activated 41 times for disasters in 30 countries. In that year the live satellites and their instrumentalities included: The high and very high resolution radar sensors of Risat-1, RADARSAT-2, TerraSAR-X, and TanDEM-X and Sentinel-1A; the optical high and very high resolution sensors of UK-DMC 2, Landsat 7 and 8, SPOT series 5, 6, and 7, Pléiades 1A and 1B, PROBA 1, SJ-9A, GF-1, KOMPSAT-2, IRS-P5 (Cartosat-1), Cartosat-2, Resourcesat-2, Oceansat-2, RapidEye, Kanopus-V, and Resurs-P, and the HDTV camera mounted the Kibo module of the International Space Station; and the medium and low optical sensors of POES, GOES, FY-3C, the Metop series, the first two Meteosat generations, and Meteor-M. Specific agreements with other entities allow for the usage of the Formosat, GeoEye, IKONOS, QuickBird, and WorldViews satellites, which have high and very high resolution. Archival data from defunct satellites such as ALOS, ENVISAT, ERS, CBERS, IRS-1C, Astra 1D, IRS P4, P6, IMS-1, RADARSAT-1, SAC-C, SPOT 1-3 & 4, UK-DMC, Landsat-5 and NigeriaSat are also available.

== Major events resulting in activation ==
This is very much a partial list; the 500th activation of the Charter was on 1 August 2016.

- 2004: The Charter was activated for the 2004 Indian Ocean earthquake and tsunami by the Indian Space Research Organisation (ISRO).
- 14 January 2010: The French Civil Protection authorities, Public Safety Canada, the American Earthquake Hazards Programme of U.S. Geological Survey and the UN Stabilisation Mission in Haiti requested a post-event map of Haiti, two days after the 2010 Haiti earthquake, via the Space and Major Disasters Charter.
- 22 February 2011: Both COGIC (French Civil Protection) and U.S. Geological Survey requested the activation of the Charter on the behalf of MCDEM New Zealand, thus readily providing satellite imagery for aid and rescue services following the 2011 Christchurch earthquake.
- 12 March 2011: Japan, through its space agency JAXA, requested the activation of the Charter to help in managing the aftermath of 2011 Tōhoku earthquake and tsunami.
- 8 November 2013: The Charter was activated by Philippine authorities as super-typhoon Haiyan made landfall.
- 11 March 2014: The Charter was activated by Chinese authorities to aid in the search for Malaysia Airlines Flight 370 which disappeared on March 8, 2014, en route from Kuala Lumpur International Airport to Beijing Capital International Airport. As of 2025, the aircraft was still lost.
- 9 October 2014: The Charter was activated by the U.S. Geological Survey on behalf of National Geospatial-Intelligence Agency to monitor the 2014 West Africa Ebola outbreak (in Sierra Leone, specifically), the first time its space assets have been used in an epidemiological role.
- 4 May 2016: Public Safety Canada activated the Charter for the Fort McMurray Wildfire.
- 13 August 2016: The Charter was activated by the U.S. Geological Survey in response to the 2016 Louisiana floods.
- 24 August 2017: The Charter was activated by the U.S. Geological Survey for Hurricane Harvey.
- 5 September 2017: The Charter was activated by the Comisión Nacional de Emergencias in the Dominican Republic for Hurricane Irma; Haiti and the United States followed suit shortly thereafter.
- 19 September 2017: The Charter was activated in the aftermath of 2017 Central Mexico earthquake.
- 20 September 2017. The Charter was activated by the Comisión Nacional de Emergencias CNE in the Dominican Republic for Hurricane Maria.
- 22 November 2017. The Charter was activated by the Comisión Nacional de Actividades Espaciales due to the disappearance of ARA San Juan.
- August 2020. The Charter was activated by the Centre Opérationnel de Gestion Interministérielle des Crises (COGIC) for the 2020 Beirut explosions.

== See also ==
- Footprint (satellite)
- International Designator
- List of Earth observation satellites
- Satellite Catalog Number
- Space exploration
