= Martin Sweeting =

British academic, entrepreneur

Sir Martin Sweeting OBE FRS FREng FIET FRAeS
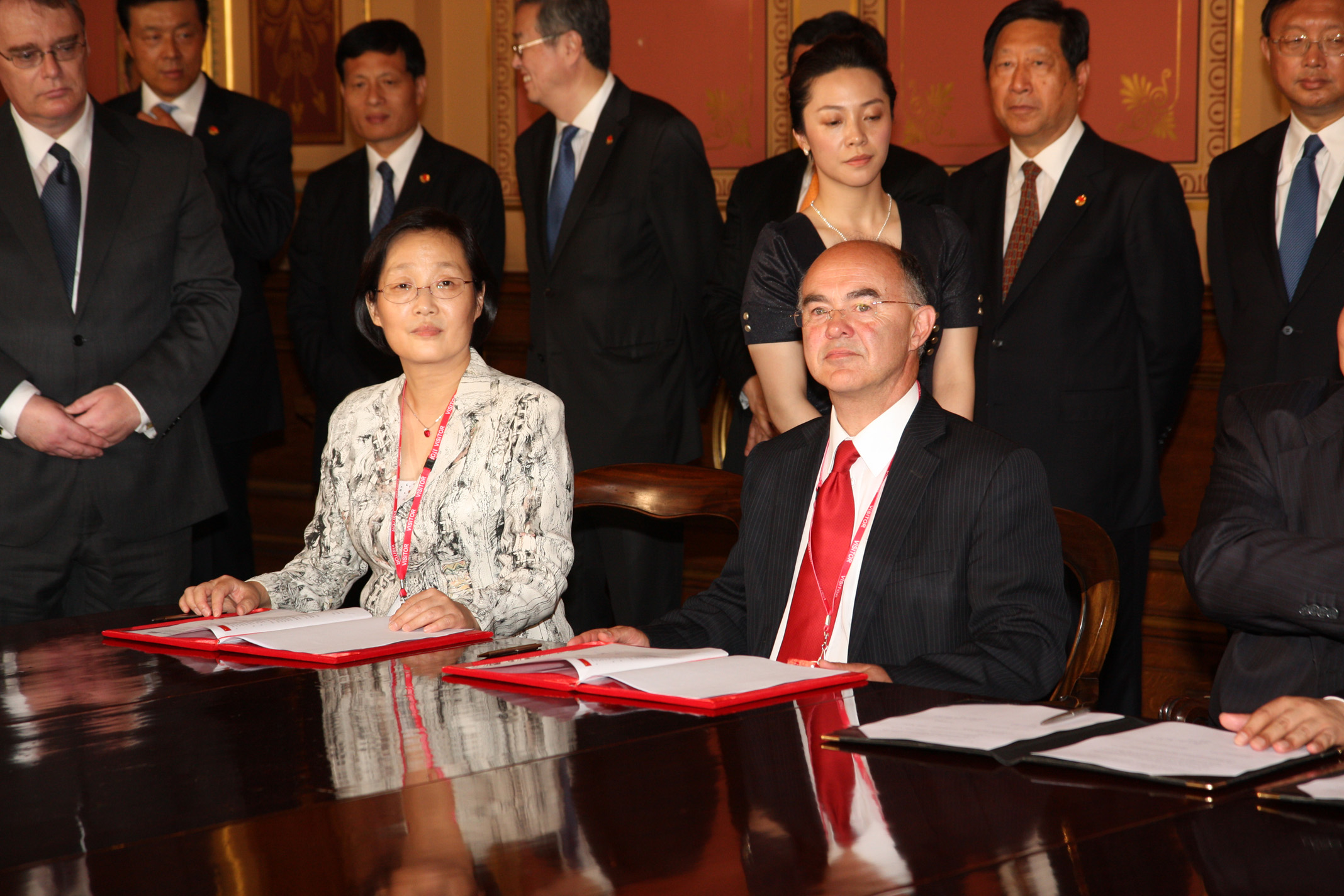
- Martin Sweeting and Wu Shuang sign a Cooperation Agreement for a Remote Sensing Satellite Constellation in 2011
- Born: Martin Nicholas Sweeting; 12 March 1951 (age 75)
- Education: University of Surrey
- Awards: FREng (1996); FRS (2000); Knight Bachelor (2002); Mullard Award (2000); Sir Arthur Clarke Award (2008); Faraday Medal (2009)
- Scientific career
- Workplaces: University of Surrey; Surrey Satellite Technology Ltd
- Thesis: The communications efficiency of electrically short aerials (1979)
- Website: surrey.ac.uk/ssc/people/martin_sweeting/

Sir Martin Nicholas Sweeting (born 12 March 1951) is the founder and executive chairman of Surrey Satellite Technology Ltd (SSTL). SSTL is a corporate spin-off from the University of Surrey, where Sweeting is a Distinguished Professor who founded and chairs the Surrey Space Centre.

== Education ==
Sweeting was educated at Aldenham School and the University of Surrey, completing a Bachelor of Science degree in 1974 followed by a PhD in 1979 on shortwave antennas.

== Career and research ==
With a team he created UoSAT-1, the first modern 70 kg (150 lb) 'microsatellite,' which he convinced the National Aeronautics and Space Administration (NASA) to launch, as a secondary piggyback payload into Low Earth orbit alongside a larger primary payload in 1981. This satellite and its successors used amateur radio bands to communicate with a ground station on the University campus. During the 1980s Sweeting took research funding to develop this new small-satellite concept further to cover possible applications such as remote sensing, and grew a small satellites research group that launched a number of later satellites. This led to the formation of Surrey Satellite Technology Ltd in 1985, with four employees and a starting capital of just £100, and to a know-how technology transfer program, introducing space technologies to other countries. SSTL was later spun off from the University and sold to Astrium in 2009 for a larger sum.

== Awards and honours ==
In 2000 Sweeting was awarded the Mullard Award by the Royal Society and was elected a Fellow of the Royal Society in the same year. In recognition of his pioneering work on cost-effective spacecraft engineering, Sweeting was knighted in 2002 and received the Frank J. Malina Astronautics Medal from the International Astronautical Federation.

In 2006 he received the Times Higher Education Supplement Award for Innovation for the Disaster Monitoring Constellation (DMC). In 2008 he was awarded the Royal Institute of Navigation Gold Medal for the successful GIOVE-A mission for the European Galileo system; and he was awarded the Sir Arthur Clarke Lifetime Achievement Award. In 2009 he was awarded the Faraday Medal by the Institute of Engineering and Technology, and an Elektra Lifetime Achievement Award by the European Electronics Industry. In 2014, the Chinese Academy of Sciences award. In 2021 he was a guest on BBC Radio 4 programme The Life Scientific.
