= UK-DMC 3 =

Three British Earth imaging satellites

- Mission type: Optical imaging Disaster monitoring
- Operator: 21AT, China
- Mission duration: 7 Years

Spacecraft properties
- Manufacturer: DMC International Imaging, SSTL
- Launch mass: 440 kilograms (970 lb), 3 Nos. each

Start of mission
- Launch date: 10 July 2015, 16:28 UTC
- Rocket: PSLV-XL
- Launch site: Satish Dhawan Space Centre
- Contractor: Indian Space Research Organisation

Orbital parameters
- Regime: Sun-synchronous

UK-DMC 3 is a constellation of three British Earth imaging satellites which are operated by DMC International Imaging. They were constructed by Surrey Satellite Technology and launched by ISRO on 10 July 2015.

== Cost ==
Beijing based Twenty-First Century Aerospace Technology Company Limited (21AT) agreed for 110 million British pounds ($170.2 million) to cover the entire cost of the three satellites' delivery in orbit.

== See also ==
- UK-DMC
- UK-DMC 2
- 2015 in spaceflight
