= CLEO (router) =

CLEO, the Cisco router in Low Earth Orbit, is an Internet router from Cisco Systems that was integrated into the UK-DMC Disaster Monitoring Constellation satellite built by Surrey Satellite Technology Ltd (SSTL) as a secondary experimental hosted payload, and launched into space with the satellite and sister satellites on a Kosmos 3M rocket from Plesetsk on 27 September 2003.

CLEO and the UK-DMC satellite were tested over five years to show the feasibility of extending the Internet to orbit, using both the Internet Protocol and Mobile IP. CLEO was configured by NASA's Glenn Research Center to be used with Virtual Mission Operations Center (VMOC) software from General Dynamics as part of a large internetworking exercise from the field at Vandenberg Air Force Base in June 2004.

On 29 March 2007, CLEO was configured for and tested on IPsec and IPv6 use, making this the first use of IPv6 on board a satellite in orbit.

The use of CLEO builds on and validates the approach to use of the Internet Protocol articulated by Keith Hogie with NASA Goddard and first demonstrated as part of the Operating Missions as Nodes on the Internet (OMNI) effort on board the UoSAT-12 satellite built by SSTL.

CLEO was followed by the IRIS router on a geostationary Intelsat satellite.
