= Surrey Satellite Technology =

British aerospace company

Coordinates: 51°14′31″N 0°37′01″W

Surrey Satellite Technology Ltd

- Premises in Guildford, UK
- Type: Subsidiary
- Industry: Aerospace
- Founded: Guildford, Surrey, UK (1985)
- Headquarters: Guildford, Surrey
- Key people: Professor Sir Martin Sweeting, Group Executive Chairman; Andrew Cawthorne, MD from December 2024
- Products: Satellites and related services
- Revenue: £2.6m on £92m sales for FY 2011. £30m turnover, £1.5m pre-tax profit were expected for FY 2006.
- Number of employees: 350
- Website: www.sstl.co.uk

Surrey Satellite Technology Ltd, or SSTL, is a company involved in the manufacture and operation of small satellites. A spin-off company of the University of Surrey, it is presently wholly owned by Airbus Defence and Space.

The company began out of research efforts centred upon amateur radio satellites, known by the UoSAT (University of Surrey Satellite) name or by an OSCAR (Orbital Satellite Carrying Amateur Radio) designation. SSTL was founded in 1985, following successful trials on the use of commercial off-the-shelf (COTS) components on satellites, cumulating in the UoSat-1 test satellite. It funds research projects with the university's Surrey Space Centre, which does research into satellite and space topics.

In April 2008, the University of Surrey agreed to sell its majority share in the company to European multinational conglomerate EADS Astrium. In August 2008, SSTL opened a US subsidiary, which included both offices and a production site in Denver, Colorado; in 2017, the company decided to discontinue manufacturing activity in the US, winding up this subsidiary.

SSTL was awarded the Queen's Award for Technological Achievement in 1998, and the Queen's Awards for Enterprise in 2005. In 2006 SSTL won the Times Higher Education award for outstanding contribution to innovation and technology. In 2009, SSTL ranked 89 out of the 997 companies that took part in the Sunday Times Top 100 companies to work for.

In 2020, SSTL started the creation of a telecommunications spacecraft called Lunar Pathfinder for lunar missions. It is due to be launched in 2027 and will be used for data transmission back to Earth.

== History ==
=== Background and early years ===
Surrey Space Centre at the University of Surrey in 2011

During the early decades of the Cold War era, access to space was effectively the privilege of a handful of superpowers; by the 1970s, only the most affluent of countries could afford to engage in space programmes due to extreme complexity and expenses involved. Despite the exorbitant costs to produce and launch, early satellites could only offer limited functionality, having no ability to be reprogrammed once in orbit. During the late 1970s, a group of researchers at the University of Surrey, headed by Martin Sweeting, were experimenting with the use of commercial off-the-shelf (COTS) components in satellite construction; if found viable, such techniques would be highly disruptive to the established satellite industry.

The team's first satellite, UoSAT-1, was assembled in a small university lab, using in a cleanroom fabricated from B&Q and integrating printed circuit boards designed by hand on a kitchen table. In 1981, UoSAT-1 was launched with NASA's aid; representing the first modern reprogrammable small satellite, it outlived its planned three-year life by more than five years. Having successfully demonstrated that relatively compact and inexpensive satellites could be rapidly built to perform sophisticated missions, the team decided to take further steps to commercialise their research.

During 1985, Surrey Satellite Technology Ltd (SSTL) was founded in Guildford, Surrey, United Kingdom as a spin-off venture from the university. Since its founding, it has steadily grown, having worked with numerous international customers to launch over 70 satellites over the course of three decades.

=== Growth and restructuring ===
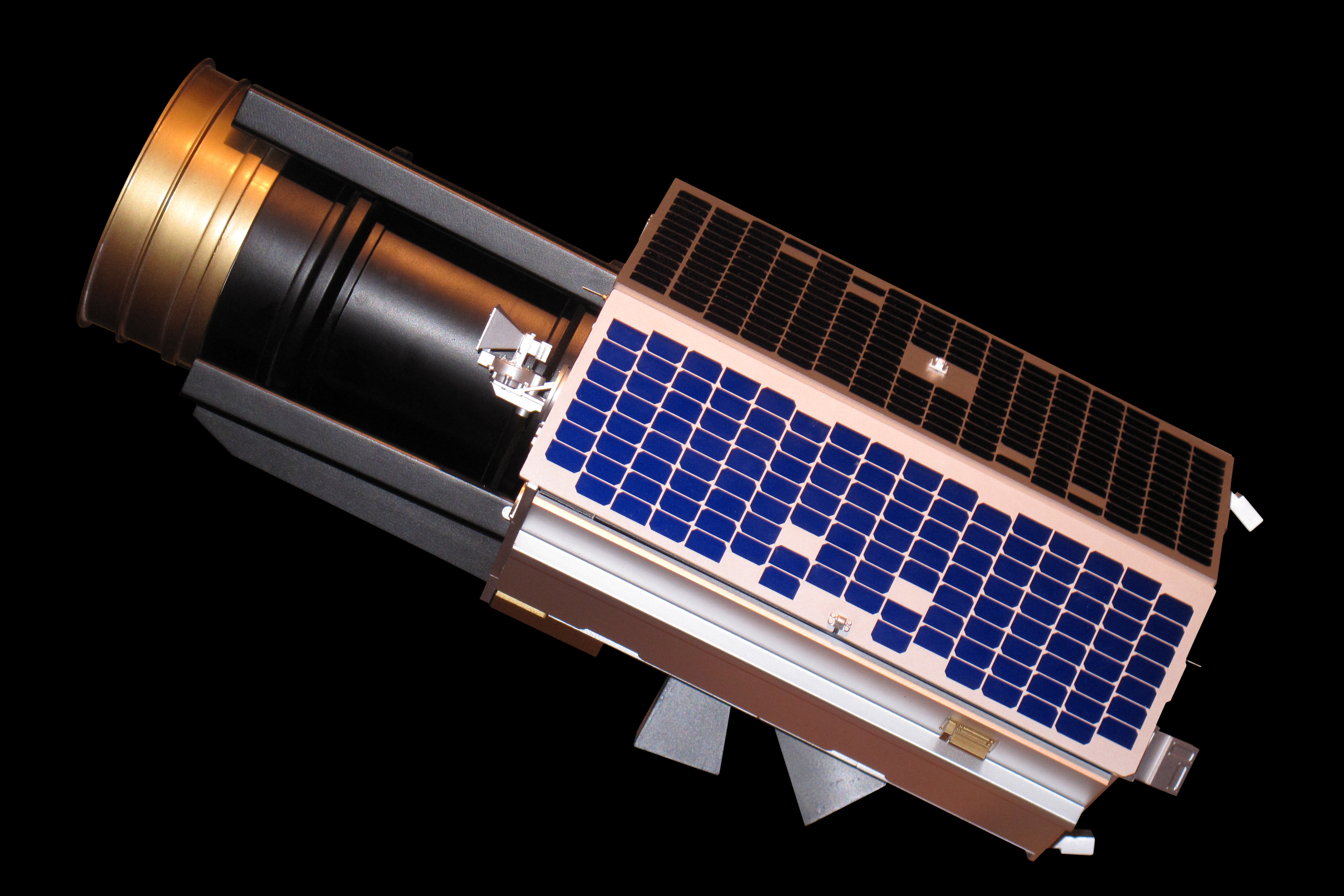
SSTL-300 satellite (scale model shown) made by Surrey

In 2002, SSTL moved into remote sensing services with the launch of the Disaster Monitoring Constellation (DMC) and an associated child company, DMC International Imaging. Some of these satellites also include other imaging payloads and experimental payloads: onboard hardware-based image compression (on BilSAT), a GPS reflectometry experiment and onboard Internet router (on the UK-DMC satellite). The DMC satellites are notable for communicating with their ground stations using the Internet Protocol for payload data transfer and command and control, so extending the Internet into space, and allowing experiments with the Interplanetary Internet to be carried out. Many of the technologies used in the design of the DMC satellites, including Internet Protocol use, were tested in space beforehand on SSTL's earlier UoSAT-12 satellite.

During June 2004, American private space company SpaceX arranged to acquire a 10% stake in SSTL from Surrey University; speaking on the purchase, Elon Musk stated: "SSTL is a high-quality company that is probably the world leader in small satellites. We look at this as more a case of similar corporate cultures getting together". The University of Surrey then awarded Musk an honorary doctorate. In April 2008, the University of Surrey agreed to sell its majority share in SSTL, roughly 80% of the company's capital, to European multinational conglomerate EADS Astrium. SSTL has remained an independent entity despite all shares having been purchased by Airbus, the parent company of EADS Astrium.

During 2005, SSTL completed construction of GIOVE-A1, the first test satellite for Europe's Galileo space navigation system. In 2010 and 2012, the firm was awarded contracts to supply 22 navigation payloads for Galileo, the last of which was delivered during 2016. During 2017, SSTL was awarded a contract to supply a further 12 payloads; this was viewed as a coup in light of the political backdrop surrounding Brexit.

During the 2010s, SSTL has been working on various improvements in its satellite technology, such as synthetic-aperture radar (SAR) as well as smaller and lighter units. According to Luis Gomes, SSTL's head of Earth observation, micro-satellites translate to a lower cost of design, construction and launch, albeit at a cost of a more frequent failure rate, in comparison to larger and more costly units. These features has been marketed towards customers such as the DMC.

In summer 2008, Surrey formed an American subsidiary, Surrey Satellite Technology-US, in Douglas County, Colorado, intent on serving US customers in the smallsat market. In June 2017, SSTL announced their intention to close their Colorado satellite manufacturing facility, opting to instead consolidate all of its manufacturing activity in the UK. Sarah Parker, SSTL's managing director, said that the rapid growth of new competing firms in the small satellite sector had changed the marketplace, necessitating reorganisation, which has included the increased use of outsourcing.

== Satellites ==
- Eutelsat Quantum satellite platform, consisting of a central thrust tube housing a bipropellant chemical propulsion system, GEO momentum wheels and gyro. Designed to be reconfigurable via software definitions, enabling it to change roles and functions. Delivered to Airbus in Toulouse during January 2019 for assembly and testing. Quantum is SSTL's first geostationary satellite platform.
- COSMIC-2/FORMOSAT-7 for National Space Organization (Taiwan) and NOAA (US). Atmospheric limb sounding by GNSS radio occultation, ionospheric research; follow-on mission to COSMIC/FORMOSAT-3.
- VESTA-1 a technology demonstration mission for Honeywell launched December 2018 that will test a new two-way VHF Data Exchange System (VDES) payload for the exactEarth advanced maritime satellite constellation. Launched 3 December 2018.
- NovaSAR-1:- Part funded by UK Government, S-Band SAR Payload supplied by Airbus Defence &Space. Incorporates an S-Band Synthetic Aperture Radar to help monitor suspicious shipping activity. Launched on 16 September 2018, by ISRO.
- RemoveDEBRIS: Active Debris Removal (ADR) technology demonstration in 2018 (e.g. capture, deorbiting) representative of an operational scenario during a low-cost mission using novel key technologies. RemoveDebris will deploy a representative small satellite and then will recapture and de-orbit it. Launched on 2 April 2018 to the International Space Station, deployed from the KIBO airlock on the ISS in June 2018.
- Telesat LEO prototype satellite for Telesat as part of a test and validation phase for an advanced, global LEO satellite constellation. Launched January 2018.

Carbonite-2 satellite (model shown) made by Surrey

- CARBONITE-2, an Earth Observation technology demonstration mission owned and operated by SSTL and launched January 2018 which successfully demonstrated video-from-orbit capability.
- TripleSat: A Constellation of 3 Earth observation satellites imaging at 1m resolution. Image data leased to Chinese company 21AT.
- Five RapidEye satellite platforms delivered to MDA MacDonald Dettwiler & Associates for the RapidEye Constellation and successfully launched from Baikonur on 29 August 2008.
- UK-DMC 2 and Deimos-1 were launched on a Dnepr rocket from the Baikonur Cosmodrome on 29 July 2009.
- NigeriaSat-2 and NX satellites, successfully launched on 17 August 2011.
- exactView-1, successfully launched on 22 July 2012 on a Soyuz rocket from the Baikonur Cosmodrome.
- SAPPHIRE: Providing a satellite-based Resident Space Object (RSO) observing service that will provide accurate tracking data on deep space orbiting objects. Sapphire is the Canadian Department of National Defence's first dedicated operational military satellite. Its space-based electro-optical sensor will track man-made space objects in Earth orbits between 6000 and 40,000 km as part of Canada's continued support of Space Situational Awareness and the U.S. Space Surveillance Network by updating the U.S. Satellite Catalogue that is used by both NORAD and Canada.
- STRaND-1: Surrey Training, Research and Nanosatellite Development 1, launched in 2013, flies several new technologies for space applications and demonstration including the use of Android (operating system) open source operating system on a Smartphone.

== Navigation payloads for Europe's Galileo constellation ==
Between 2010 and 2020 SSTL manufactured and delivered 34 navigation payloads for the deployment phase of Galileo, Europe's satellite navigation system. OHB System AG was the prime contractor and builder of the spacecraft platform and SSTL had full responsibility for the navigation payloads, the brains of Galileo's navigation system.

== See also ==
- Aerospace industry in the United Kingdom
- Comparison of satellite buses
- UoSAT-1
- UoSAT-2
- UoSAT-3
- UoSAT-4
- UoSAT-5
- UoSAT-12
- Cerise
- AlSAT-1
- UK-DMC
- UK-DMC 2
- UK-DMC 3
- BILSAT-1
- Deimos-1
- Snap-1 nanosatellite
- FASat-Alfa and Bravo
- RemoveDEBRIS
- KazEOSat 2
