= Internet Routing in Space =

IRIS Space Router

Internet Routing in Space (IRIS) was a program to build a radiation-tolerant IP router created by Cisco Systems for satellite and related spacecraft. It was a follow-on from Cisco's earlier CLEO router in space on the UK-DMC satellite. The Cisco Space Router was launched to geostationary orbit on board Intelsat 14 (IS-14), a spacecraft built by Space Systems/Loral for satellite operator Intelsat, in November 2009. IRIS was evaluated by the United States Department of Defense by way of a JCTD (Joint Capabilities Technology Demonstration). The Space Router runs Cisco IOS (Internetworking Operating System) software and also contains an onboard Software-defined radio running satellite modem waveforms. The United States Department of Defense used the JCTD to evaluate the reduced latency, improved throughput and increased flexibility provided by the Space Router.

The Space Router provided the ability to route Internet Protocol computer network traffic on board the satellite, which enabled users of Web, VoIP, and other IP applications to directly communicate without having to double-hop data to and from an intermediate Earth station. The ability to avoid the double-hop to the Earth station can reduce latency, which is approximately 250 ms for GEO satellites. Latency reduction is a key driver for increased use of real-time applications, including video teleconferencing, over satellites.

The avoidance of the double-hop to the Earth station can also reduce satellite transponder costs. Routing IP traffic natively on the satellite with the router's built-in Cisco IOS Software and onboard software-defined radio can increase throughput, reduce latency, and enable flexible bandwidth-on-demand real-time applications between users in different geographic regions that do not have easy access to fiber networks.

IRIS is an example of a hosted payload, a method to add multiple non-core components to satellite to reduce the cost of launching the components into orbit.
