= BILSAT-1 =

Earth observation satellite

- Mission type: Earth observation
- Operator: TÜBİTAK Space Technologies Research Institute (TÜBİTAK UZAY)
- COSPAR ID: 2003-042E
- SATCAT no.: 27943
- Mission duration: 3 years

Spacecraft properties
- Manufacturer: DMC International Imaging
- Launch mass: 130 kilograms (290 lb)

Start of mission
- Launch date: September 27, 2003, 06:12 UTC
- Rocket: Kosmos-3M
- Launch site: Plesetsk 132/1

End of mission
- Deactivated: August 2006

Orbital parameters
- Reference system: Geocentric
- Regime: Sun-synchronous
- Eccentricity: 0.001
- Perigee altitude: 675 kilometres (419 mi)
- Apogee altitude: 694 kilometres (431 mi)
- Inclination: 98.2 degrees
- Period: 98.5 minutes
- Epoch: 27 September 2003, 02:12:00 UTC

BILSAT-1 (formerly just BILSAT) was an Earth observation satellite designed and developed by TÜBİTAK Space Technologies Research Institute (TÜBİTAK UZAY) and produced in Turkey as part of the Disaster Monitoring Constellation (DMC) project in the context of a show-how program led by DMC International Imaging of Surrey Satellite Technology (SSTL).

== Launch ==
BILSAT-1 was launched from Plesetsk Cosmodrome Site 132/1, Arkhangelsk Oblast in Russia by a Kosmos-3M space launch vehicle on September 27, 2003, at 06:12 UTC in a multiple-satellite payload launch along with six other satellites, namely Mozhayets-4 and Larets of Russia, NigeriaSat of Nigeria, UK-DMC from the United Kingdom, South Korean STSAT-1 and Germany's Rubin 4-DS. It was placed in a polar, circular, Sun-synchronous geocentric orbit at an altitude of 686 km (426 mi) with orbital parameters as period 98.5 min, apogee 694 km (431 mi), perigee 675 km (419 mi) and inclination 98.2°.

== Mission ==
One of the four spacecraft of the DMC project, which is an organization for international space program cooperation formed by seven countries, namely United Kingdom, Algeria, China, Nigeria, Thailand, Vietnam and Turkey, BILSAT-1 was dedicated to studies on agriculture, forestry, hydrology, land cover/use and mapping, environment as well as urban area development. It was built at a cost of $14 million.

The first images were from Cape Town, South Africa taken on October 18, Gulf of İskenderun, Turkey taken on October 30 and Kuwait City taken on November 6, 2003.

BILSAT-1 ended its mission in August 2006 due to battery cells failure.

== Payloads ==
Turkey's first indigenously developed scientific microsatellite for remote sensing, BILSAT-1 was based on an enhanced SSTL-100 satellite bus. The 130 kg (290 lb) satellite features a multi-spectral instrument called ÇOBAN, which is a low-resolution 8-channel camera. The name is an abbreviation for "ÇOk-BANtlı Kamera" for "Multi-Band Camera". It has two imaging sensors, a 4-band visible and near-infrared (VNIR) sensor at a resolution of 26 m (85 ft) and a high-resolution panchromatic sensor at 4 m (13 ft). The swath widths were 55 km (34 mi) for the VNIR and 25 km (16 mi) for the panchromatic sensor. The sensors had a 4-day repeat cycle.

BILSAT-1 hosted a real time image compression module named GEZGIN, an abbreviation for "GErçek Zamanda Görüntü İşleyeN", which is a digital signal processor using JPEG 2000 algorithm to compress images taken by the satellite. Further payloads are on board propulsion, GPS navigation device, a GPS attitude receiver and a control moment gyroscope. BILSAT-1 also hosted new technologies such as high-capacity solid-state data recorders and star trackers.
