= SNAP-1 =

- Mission type: Technology
- Operator: SSTL / University of Surrey
- COSPAR ID: 2000-033C
- SATCAT no.: 26386

Spacecraft properties
- Manufacturer: SSTL / University of Surrey
- Launch mass: 6.5 kilograms (14 lb)

Start of mission
- Launch date: 28 June 2000, 12:13:00 UTC
- Rocket: Kosmos-3M
- Launch site: Plesetsk 132/1

Orbital parameters
- Reference system: Geocentric
- Regime: Low Earth
- Perigee altitude: 666 kilometres (414 mi)
- Apogee altitude: 682 kilometres (424 mi)
- Inclination: 98.1 deg
- Period: 98.2 minutes

SNAP-1 is a British nanosatellite in low Earth orbit. The satellite was built at the Surrey Space Centre by Surrey Satellite Technology Ltd (SSTL) and members of the University of Surrey. It was launched on 28 June 2000 on board a Kosmos-3M rocket from the Plesetsk Cosmodrome in northern Russia. It shared the launch with a Russian Nadezhda search and relay spacecraft and the Chinese Tsinghua-1 microsatellite.

== Mission ==
The objectives of the SNAP-1 mission were to:

- Develop and prove a modular commercial off-the-shelf (COTS) based nanosatellite bus.
- Evaluate new manufacturing techniques and technologies.
- Image the Tsinghua-1 microsatellite during its deployment (timed to occur a few seconds after the deployment of SNAP-1).
- Demonstrate the systems required for future nanosatellite constellations. For example: three-axis attitude control, Global Positioning System (GPS) based orbit determination, and orbital manoeuvres.
- Depending on propellant availability, rendezvous with Tsinghua-1 and demonstrate formation flying.

During deployment, SNAP-1 successfully imaged the Nadezhda and Tsinghua-1 satellites that accompanied it on the launch. Once in orbit, SNAP-1 achieved three-axis attitude control, then demonstrated its orbital maintenance capability using its butane cold gas propulsion system.

== Architecture ==
The 6.5 kilograms (14 lb) SNAP-1 satellite contained the following modules:

- Power System
- VHF Receiver
- S-band Transmitter
- Attitude and Orbit Control System (AOCS)
- Cold-Gas Propulsion (CGP) System
- On-Board Computer (OBC)
- VHF spread-spectrum communications payload
- UHF inter-satellite link
- Machine Vision System (MVS)
