= Sterkh =

Russian satellite-based search and rescue system

Sterkh was a Russian satellite-based search and rescue system, which formed part of the International Search and Rescue Satellite-Aided System (COSPAS-SARSAT).

== Overview ==
Sterkh was developed as a replacement for the older Nadezhda system. Unlike their predecessors, Sterkh satellites did not carry navigation systems, since this function had been taken over by GLONASS. Sterkh satellites were smaller than their predecessors and were designed to be launched as secondary payloads with other satellites.

The satellites had a mass of 160 kg. Their overall dimensions were 750 x 1359 x 2000 mm in shipping condition, and 976 x 2957 x 10393 mm in operational condition, with opened solar panels and risen gravitational bar. The satellites incorporated the air-borne radio rescue complex RK-SM. They were expected to have an operational lifetime of 5 years. The satellites were designed and manufactured by Production Corporation Polyot.

The first satellite in the series, Sterkh-1, was launched on 21 July 2009 aboard a Kosmos-3M carrier rocket along with a Parus.

Sterkh-2 was launched on 17 September 2009 on a Soyuz-2.1b along with 7 other satellites.

Both satellites, however, failed shortly after their respective launches. Sterkh-1's flight control system malfunctioned, leaving the satellite unable to orient its solar panels toward the Sun, depleting its battery. Sterkh-2's attitude control system was rendered inoperable due to the failed deployment of a stabilization boom. These failures led Roscosmos to cancel the Sterkh program in November 2012, and follow-on search and rescue payloads were launched on GLONASS-K satellites instead.
