= Intelsat 14 =

Communications satellite

- Mission type: Communications
- Operator: Intelsat
- COSPAR ID: 2009-064A
- SATCAT no.: 36097
- Mission duration: 16 years

Spacecraft properties
- Bus: LS-1300
- Manufacturer: Space Systems/Loral
- Launch mass: 5,663 kilograms (12,485 lb)
- Dry mass: 2,517 kilograms (5,549 lb)

Start of mission
- Launch date: 23 November 2009, 06:55:00 UTC
- Rocket: Atlas V 431
- Launch site: Cape Canaveral SLC-41
- Contractor: United Launch Alliance

Orbital parameters
- Reference system: Geocentric
- Regime: Geostationary
- Longitude: 45° west
- Semi-major axis: 42,165.0 kilometres (26,200.1 mi)
- Perigee altitude: 35,783.5 kilometres (22,234.8 mi)
- Apogee altitude: 35,805.5 kilometres (22,248.5 mi)
- Inclination: 0°
- Period: 1,436.1 minutes
- Epoch: 19 April 2017

Transponders
- Band: 40 C-band; 22 Ku-band
- Bandwidth: 72 MHz (8 C-band); 36 MHz (others)
- Coverage area: Americas, Europe, Africa

Intelsat 14 is a communications satellite owned by Intelsat located at 45° West longitude, serving the Americas, Europe, and African markets. Intelsat 14 replaced Intelsat 1R which was at the end of its design life. It was built by Space Systems Loral, as part of its LS-1300 line.

== Communications payload ==
Intelsat 14 has a C-band and K_{u} band payload, each of which is further divided to provide service to 2 each coverage areas.

The C-band payload has an Americas beam which covers the southern part of the United States, all of Mexico, Central America, and all of South America. A second C-band beam provides coverage for Western Europe and Africa.

The K_{u} band payload also has an Americas beam which covers the Alabama, Georgia and Florida, all of the Caribbean, Central America and all of South America except Brazil. The K_{u} band US/Europe/Africa beam covers the southern eastern United States, Western Europe, and the northern western African countries.

Intelsat 14 also carries an experimental radiation-tolerant IP router payload that can be connected to several of the C and K_{u} band channels. This experimental payload is known as IRIS (Internet Routing in Space) demonstration.

Payload	C band	Ku Band
Transponders	40	22
Bandwidth	32 at 36 MHz; 8 at 72 MHz	22 at 36 MHz
Amplifier type	TWTA	TWTA
Amplifier output	50 watts	120 watts
Amplifier Redundancy	2 groups of 16 for 12; 2 groups of 10 for 8	2 groups of 14 for 11
Receiver redundancy	4 for 2	4 for 2
Coverage	Americas, Europe, Africa	Americas, Europe, Africa
Beacon frequency Horizontal polarisation	3704.0 MHz	11694.0 MHz
Beacon frequency Vertical polarisation	3705.0 MHz	11695.0 MHz

== Launch ==
Intelsat 14 was launched from Cape Canaveral Air Force Station Space Launch Complex 41 November 23, 2009 on an Atlas V rocket flying in the 431 configuration. The satellite was released into a geosynchronous transfer orbit 1 hour and 58 minutes after lift-off.
