= UoSAT-2 =

British satellite

- Operator: University of Surrey
- COSPAR ID: 1984-021B
- SATCAT no.: 14781

Spacecraft properties
- Manufacturer: SSTL
- Launch mass: 60 kilograms (130 lb)

Start of mission
- Launch date: 1 March 1984, 17:59 UTC
- Rocket: Delta 3920
- Launch site: Vandenberg SLC-2W

Orbital parameters
- Reference system: Geocentric
- Regime: Sun-synchronous
- Inclination: 98.25 degrees

UoSAT-2, which is also known as UO-11 and OSCAR-11, is a British satellite orbiting in Low Earth Orbit. The satellite functions as an amateur radio transmitter (known as an OSCAR) and was built at the University of Surrey. It launched into orbit in March 1984 and remains orbital and active, though unstable with irregular periods of transmission. All of the analogue telemetry channels failed in 2005, but as of 2014 the status channels were still operational. The satellite was still heard transmitting telemetry in 2026, forty-two years after launch.

It was operated by Surrey Satellite Technology Ltd.

== Characteristics ==
The satellite was the second in the UoSAT series of satellites built by University of Surrey; preceded by UoSAT-1 and followed by UoSAT-3.

The satellite carries a Digitalker speech synthesiser, magnetometers, a CCD camera, a Geiger-Müller tube, and a microphone to detect the vibrations of micrometeoroid impacts. Like UoSAT-1 it transmits telemetry data on the VHF beacon at 1200 baud, using asynchronous AFSK, though now all analogue telemetry channels have failed; on an FM receiver the audio signal resembles the cassette data format of the contemporary BBC Micro computer. Actually it is a BASICODE signal, but no citation. Slight modulation had also been observed on the S band beacon.

UoSAT-2's solar arrays were bought at a premium compared to those of UoSAT-1, the design having been space tested by its predecessor.

== Support ==
The British affiliate of AMSAT distributed a library of software for the BBC Micro to track UoSAT-2 and other satellites and analyse telemetry broadcasts. A commercial fixed-frequency receiver, Astrid, was also produced by British firm MM Microwave for the education market, with accompanying BBC Micro software to display raw telemetry frames. For versatility the Astrid set included a demodulator to load signals through the serial port of any computer.

== South Atlantic anomaly ==
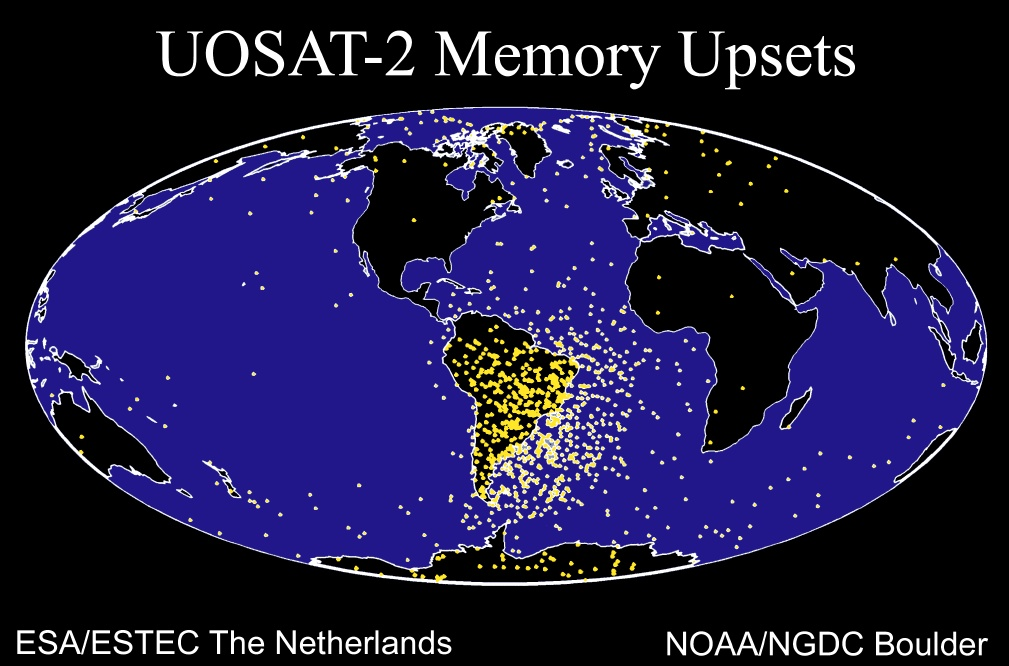
Data upsets

As it went around the Earth it encountered data upsets, geo-located around the South Atlantic anomaly.

== Status ==
According to a February 2008 status report the satellite had no viable battery backup, operating only from its solar panels, and a watchdog timer on board was suspending activity for up to three weeks following any power anomaly. At the time of the report it was experiencing continuous sunlight for the last time, with the prediction that "permanent eclipses" in its orbit would begin in the middle of March 2008, limiting transmissions to "a short time, possibly less [than] a single orbit, every 21 days." By April 2008 the updated prediction was that eclipses would continue until 2019.

After a 21-month gap in observations, UoSAT-2 resumed sending telemetry sometime before 10 December 2009, and is apparently continuing the watchdog-controlled transmission regime, though now on a ten-days-on, ten-days-off schedule. Its condition has not otherwise improved apart from some recovery of battery power, allowing broadcasts to continue into each eclipse.

Current observation reports for UoSAT-2 can be viewed and logged at the Oscar Satellite Status Page.

== 1988 Ski-Trek arctic expedition ==
The satellite was instrumental in providing a communications link, known as Nordski Comm, from the Ski-Trek support teams to the expedition party. The position of the skiers' emergency beacon was calculated daily by Cospas-Sarsat ground stations and relayed to them, and thousands of amateur radio listeners, as a spoken message from the Digitalker on board UoSAT-2. The message could also serve as an emergency channel to the skiers in the event that all other radio links failed.
