= Kosmos-3M =

Russian space launch vehicle

Kosmos-3M (R-14 11K65M)
- Drawing of the Kosmos-3M with bulges on payload fairing for launching SAR Lupe
- Function: Orbital launch vehicle
- Manufacturer: Yuzhnoye / NPO Polyot
- Country of origin: Soviet Union, Russia

Size
- Height: 32.4 m (106 ft)
- Diameter: 2.4 m (7 ft 10 in)
- Mass: 109,000 kg (240,000 lb)
- Stages: 2

Capacity

Payload to Low Earth orbit
- Mass: 1,500 kg (3,300 lb)

Payload to Sun-synchronous orbit
- Mass: 775 kg (1,709 lb)

Launch history
- Status: Retired
- Launch sites: Plesetsk Cosmodrome, Site 132; Site 133/3; Kapustin Yar Site 107
- Total launches: 444
- Success(es): 424
- Failure: 20
- First flight: 15 May 1967
- Last flight: 27 April 2010

First stage – R-14U
- Powered by: 1 RD-216
- Maximum thrust: 1,485 kN (334,000 lb_{f})
- Specific impulse: 291 seconds
- Burn time: 131 seconds
- Propellant: AK27I / UDMH

Second stage – S3M
- Powered by: 1 11D49
- Maximum thrust: 157 kN (35,000 lb_{f})
- Specific impulse: 293 seconds
- Burn time: 350 + 350 seconds
- Propellant: AK27I/UDMH

The Kosmos-3M (Russian: Космос-3М meaning "Cosmos", GRAU index 11K65M) was a Soviet Union and later Russian space launch vehicle, member of the Kosmos rocket family. It was a liquid-fueled two-stage launch vehicle, first launched in 1967 and with over 420 successful launches to its name.

== History ==
The Kosmos-3M used UDMH fuel and AK27I oxidizer (red fuming nitric acid) to lift roughly 1,400 kg (3,100 lb) of payload into orbit. It differed from the earlier Kosmos-3 in its finer control of the second-stage burn, allowing operators to tune the thrust and even channel it through nozzles that helped orient the rocket for the launching of multiple satellites at one time.

PO Polyot manufactured these launch vehicles in the Russian city of Omsk for decades. It was originally scheduled to be retired from service in 2011; however, in April 2010 the Commander of the Russian Space Forces confirmed that it would be retired by the end of 2010. One further launch, with Kanopus-ST, was planned; however, this was cancelled in late 2012 as the launch vehicle had exceeded its design life while in storage ahead of the launch.

== Notable launches ==
Date	Site	Payload(s)	References
19 April 1975	Kapustin Yar	Aryabhata	
7 June 1979	Kapustin Yar	Bhaskara I	
20 November 1981	Kapustin Yar	Bhaskara II	
28 April 1999	Kapustin Yar	ABRIXAS	
28 June 2000	Plesetsk	Nadezhda, Tsinghua-1, SNAP-1	
28 Nov 2002	Plesetsk	ALSAT-1, Mozhayets	
27 Sept 2003	Plesetsk	NigeriaSAT-1, BILSAT-1, UK-DMC (BNSCSat), Mozhayets-4, KAISTSat-4, Larets, Rubin-4	
27 October 2005	Plesetsk	(United Kingdom) QinetiQ TopSat; (United Kingdom) SSTL Beijing-1; (Russia) Mozhayets 5; (Iran) Sinah-1; (Germany) Rubin-5; (Germany) UWE-1; (Japan) X-Factor Investigator-V; (Norway) nCube-2	
2 July 2007	Plesetsk	SAR-Lupe-2	
11 September 2007	Plesetsk	Kosmos-2429	
27 March 2008	Plesetsk	SAR-Lupe 4	
19 June 2008	Kapustin Yar	Orbcomm	
22 July 2008	Plesetsk	SAR-Lupe 5	
21 July 2009	Plesetsk Site 132/1	Kosmos 2454 (Parus); Sterkh-1	

== Accidents ==
A total of 446 Kosmos 3Ms were launched from 1967 to 2010, with 22 failures. Some of the more noteworthy ones:

On 22 December 1970, a launch of a target vehicle for ASAT tests lost thrust at liftoff and fell back onto the pad at Plesetsk, exploding and badly damaging it.

On 26 June 1973, a Kosmos 3M exploded on the pad at Plesetsk during a propellant loading accident, killing nine people.

An attempted launch of an Intercosmos scientific satellite on 3 June 1975 failed 84 seconds into the launch when the first stage engine shut down.

An attempted launch of a military radar calibration satellite on 25 January 1983 suffered another first stage failure about 40 seconds into launch when the RD-219 started losing thrust. The onboard computer automatically shut the engine off and the launch vehicle fell into the Northern Dvina. Due to the tense relations between the U.S. and Soviet Union at this time, the U.S. military was widely suspected of having shot down the launch vehicle and General Secretary Yuri Andropov personally informed of this possibility. However, a group of locals ice fishing in the Dvina had witnessed the booster plunge into the river and reported what they'd seen to authorities. After this and a quick examination of telemetry, sabotage was ruled out. The failure was traced to high-frequency combustion instability, which had been a problem with the RD-219 engine and was also responsible for the 1970 and 1975 Kosmos 3M failures. The engine was redesigned and no further launches were lost due to first stage engine failures.

More recently, on 21 November 2000, a Kosmos 3M launcher failed to place the QuickBird 1 satellite into orbit due to a failure of its second stage. The launch vehicle and satellite reentered the atmosphere over Uruguay, and an inquest into the accident was inconclusive.

== See also ==
- Comparison of orbital launcher families
- Comparison of orbital launch systems
