= Disaster Monitoring Constellation =

Satellite constellation

The Disaster Monitoring Constellation for International Imaging (DMCii) or just Disaster Monitoring Constellation (DMC) consists of a number of remote sensing satellites constructed by Surrey Satellite Technology Ltd (SSTL) and operated for the Algerian, Nigerian, Turkish, British and Chinese governments by DMC International Imaging. The DMC provides emergency Earth imaging for disaster relief under the International Charter for Space and Major Disasters, which the DMC formally joined in November 2005. Other DMC Earth imagery is used for a variety of civil applications by a variety of governments. Spare available imaging capacity is sold under contract.

The DMC provides far larger areas of imagery than, but at comparable resolution to, established government imaging satellites such as Landsat. DMC imagery was deliberately designed to be comparable to Landsat imagery, in order to leverage the expertise and software of the large established remote sensing community used to working with Landsat images. Imagery can be provided far more rapidly from the DMC than from Landsat, thanks to having multiple similar satellites in orbit ready to cross over a point of interest, and the larger images produced. This brings the responsiveness that is needed for emergencies and for disaster support, with images provided across the Internet from the responsive satellite and a member country's ground station within a day or less of a request being made.

The DMC has monitored the effects and aftermath of the Indian Ocean Tsunami (December 2004), Hurricane Katrina (August 2005), and many other floods, fires and disasters.

== Satellites ==
The Sun-synchronous orbits of these satellites are coordinated so that the satellites follow each other around an orbital plane, ascending north over the Equator at 10:15 am local time (and 10:30 am local time for Beijing-1).

Some of these satellites also include other imaging payloads and experimental payloads: onboard hardware-based image compression (on BilSAT), a GPS reflectometry experiment and onboard Internet router (on the UK-DMC satellite). The DMC satellites are notable for communicating with their ground stations using the Internet Protocol for payload data transfer and command and control, so extending the Internet into space, and allowing experiments with the Interplanetary Internet to be carried out. Many of the technologies used in the design of the DMC satellites, including Internet Protocol use, were tested in space beforehand on SSTL's earlier UoSAT-12 satellite.

=== First Generation ===
- AlSAT-1 (Algeria), launched November 2002, which completed its mission in August 2010.
- BILSAT-1 (Turkey), launched September 2003, which completed its mission in August 2006 due to failed battery cells.
- NigeriaSAT-1 (Nigeria), launched September 2003, completed mission October 2012.
- UK-DMC (United Kingdom), launched September 2003, completed mission November 2011.

=== Second Generation ===
- Beijing-1 (China), launched October 2005. Completed its mission in 2013.
- UK-DMC 2 (United Kingdom), launched July 2009.
- Deimos-1 (Spanish commercial), launched July 2009.
- NigeriaSAT-2 and NigeriaSAT-X (NX) launched 2011.
