= AlSAT-1 =

Algerian satellite that is part of the Disaster Monitoring Constellation

ALSAT-1
- Mission type: Earth observation
- Operator: CNTS / SSTL
- COSPAR ID: 2002-054A
- SATCAT no.: 27559
- Mission duration: 7 years and 9 months

Spacecraft properties
- Manufacturer: SSTL
- Launch mass: 88 kilograms (194 lb)

Start of mission
- Launch date: 28 November 2002, 06:07:00 UTC
- Rocket: Kosmos-3M
- Launch site: Plesetsk Cosmodrome

End of mission
- Deactivated: August 2010

Orbital parameters
- Regime: Sun synchronous
- Periapsis altitude: 700 kilometres (430 mi)
- Apoapsis altitude: 700 kilometres (430 mi)
- Inclination: 98 degrees
- Period: 98.5 min

ALSAT-1 is the first Algerian satellite and it is part of a group of satellites collectively known as the Disaster Monitoring Constellation (DMC). The satellite was built by a group of engineers from Surrey Satellite Technology (SSTL) and Algerian Centre National des Techniques Spatiales (CNTS). It was the first DMC satellite to be launched of the five to seven that are planned. The DMC was the first satellite constellation designed for that objective. The launch took place on 28 November 2002 from the Plesetsk Cosmodrome in northern Russia on a Kosmos-3M launcher in -20 degree Celsius weather. It completed its mission after seven years and nine months in August 2010. The satellite was designed to operate for five years.

AlSat-1 is built on the SSTL-100 platform. The onboard instrumentation consists of two banks with three Earth imaging cameras each that, in total, have a resolution of 32 meters in three spectral bands (NIR, red, and green). The imaging swath of the cameras is 600 km. The satellite was constructed in a fifteen-month time period by the British and Algerians, of which eleven Algerian engineers were trained by SSTL. The satellite uses resistojets for propulsion, and butane as its propellant. The resistojets provide more than 20 m/s of delta velocity.

== Operations ==
This satellite carried the first Slim 6 Line Imager. The imaging opportunities for Algeria are one per day, for two or three days out of five days. During the first three months of operations, more than 80 images were transmitted back to Earth.

== See also ==
- National Space Program (Algeria)
