= Lunar Trailblazer =

NASA satellite to study characteristics of water on the Moon

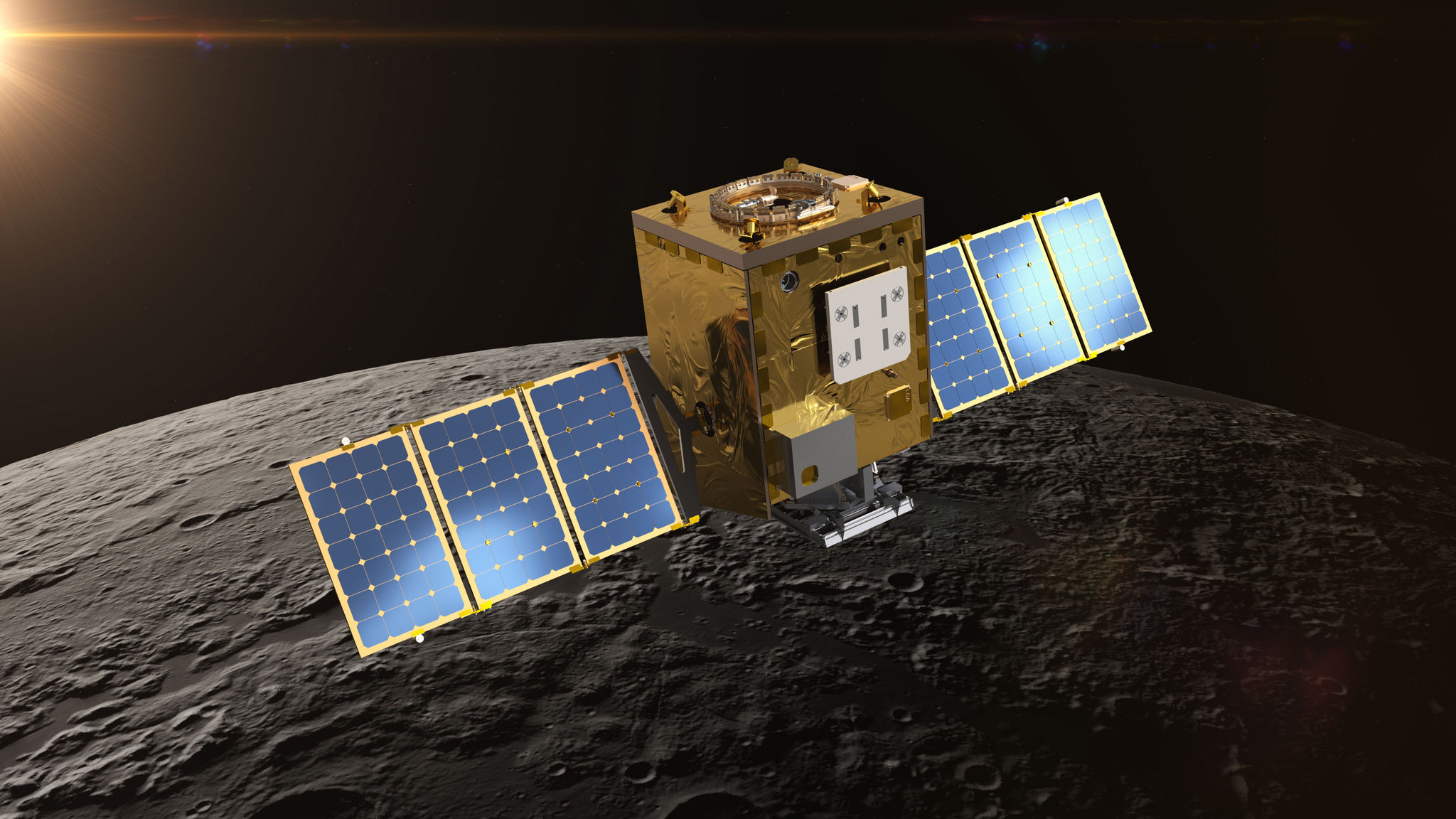
- Artist's impression of the spacecraft
- Mission type: Lunar mapping
- Operator: NASA
- COSPAR ID: 2025-038C
- SATCAT no.: 63101
- Website: trailblazer.caltech.edu
- Mission duration: 1 year (planned); 11 hours, 13 minutes (total)

Spacecraft properties
- Bus: LM-200
- Manufacturer: Lockheed Martin
- Launch mass: 210 kg (460 lb)
- Payload mass: 20 kg (44 lb)
- Power: 280 W

Start of mission
- Launch date: 27 February 2025, 00:16:30 UTC
- Rocket: Falcon 9 Block 5 B1083.9
- Launch site: Kennedy, LC-39A
- Contractor: SpaceX

End of mission
- Disposal: Spacecraft failure
- Declared: 31 July 2025
- Last contact: 27 February 2025, 11:30 UTC

Moon orbiter
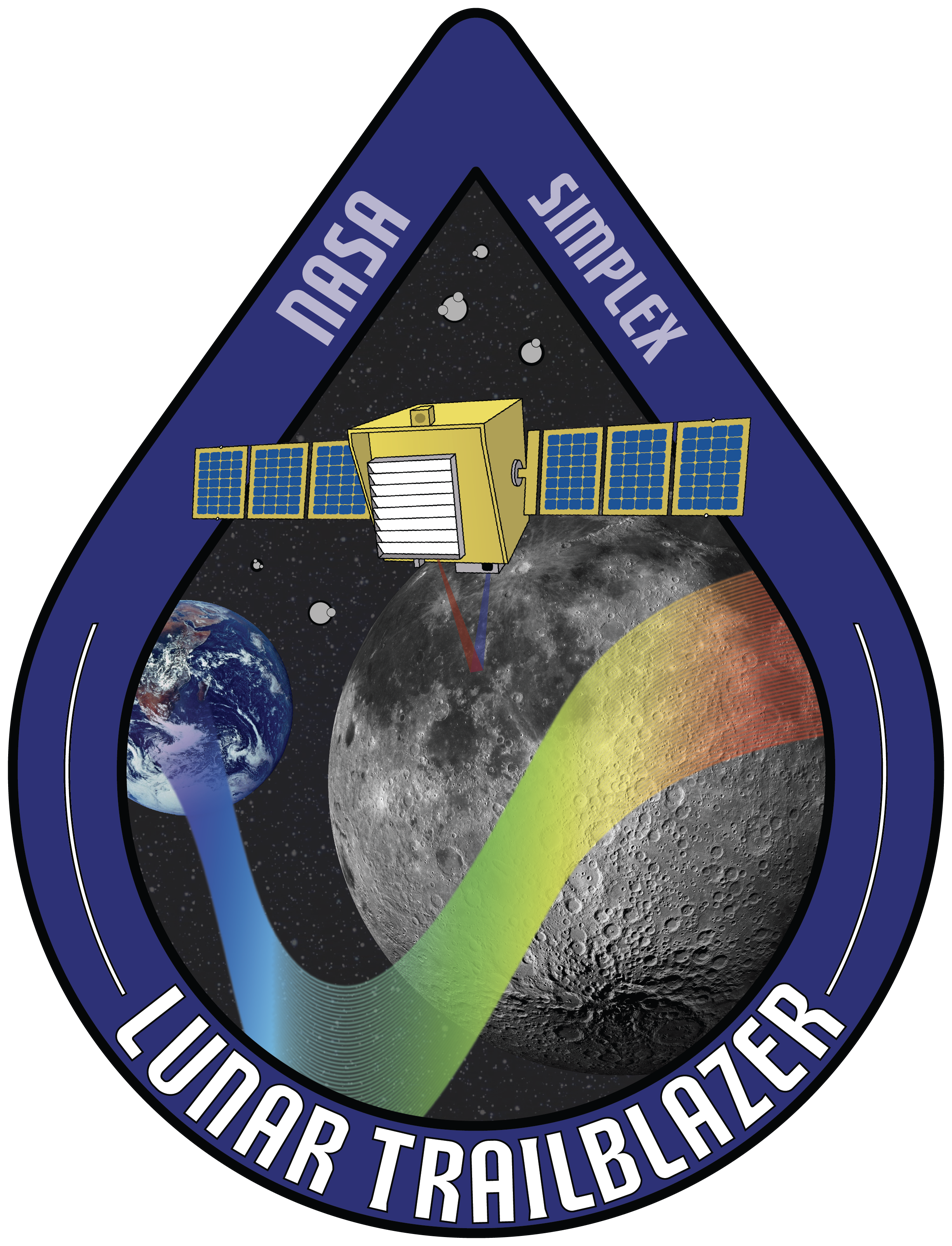
- Small Innovative Missions for Planetary Exploration (SIMPLEx) Program

Lunar Trailblazer was a small (class D) lunar orbiter, part of NASA's SIMPLEx program, with a mission to detect and map water on the lunar surface to determine how its form, abundance, and location relate to geology. Its mission was to aid in the understanding of lunar water and the Moon's water cycle. Lunar Trailblazer was launched on 27 February 2025, as a secondary payload on the IM-2 mission. The Principal Investigator (PI) of the mission was Bethany Ehlmann, a professor at Caltech. Soon after launch, NASA lost contact with the spacecraft. The mission never recovered and it was ended in July 2025.

== Mission ==
Lunar Trailblazer was selected to be part of NASA's Small Innovative Missions for Planetary Exploration (SIMPLEx) program in 2019. The goal of the mission was to use a small satellite to map water on the Moon.

The mission had four scientific objectives:

- measure and map the amount, location and form (hydroxyl, H_{2}O, or ice) of lunar water and determine any correlation to latitude and surface makeup
- study the time-variability of lunar water in sunlit portions of the Moon
- determine the form, amount, and location of lunar water in permanently shadowed parts of the Moon
- study how changes in surface temperature affect concentrations of water and ice

In addition, the spacecraft was to search for good locations for future lunar landings.

=== Launch and mission outcome ===
Like other SIMPLEx missions, Lunar Trailblazer was launched aboard a SpaceX Falcon 9 as a "rideshare" with another NASA or commercial mission. It was launched as a secondary payload on the IM-2 mission in February 2025 with a number of other payloads. Originally it was going to launch with IMAP in 2025, but NASA found a different rideshare opportunity since the spacecraft was scheduled to be completed in 2022.

Soon after launch, NASA lost contact with the spacecraft. The mission was ended on July 31, 2025 after all attempts to contact the spacecraft were unsuccessful. A NASA review panel attributed the mission failure to a software error that resulted in a misorientation of the solar panels, compounded with erroneous on-board fault management actions.

=== Orbit ===
Lunar Trailblazer was to orbit the Moon in a 100 km (62 mi) polar orbit to study water on the Moon using its two scientific instruments.. NASA's Lunar Trailblazer is currently lost in space, likely in a heliocentric (sun-orbiting) orbit.

== Scientific background ==
Unshielded from the vacuum of space, lunar landscapes are exposed to full illumination from the Sun for about two weeks, and total darkness for another two weeks. The Moon's day—one full rotation—is equivalent to about twenty eight Earth days. Adding to the harshness of this surface environment, the Moon has almost no atmosphere and no magnetosphere to protect it from the Sun's radiation. So, the lunar surface undergoes extreme temperature swings every day and night. During the day, temperatures near the equator are well above boiling, up to 400 K, or 260°F. At night, these latitudes reach temperatures far below freezing (around 170 K/-150°F at most). Any water that reaches the surface during the night would be expected to boil away during the day, or quickly sublime away in the low pressure.

On the Moon, there is no rainfall, but there are other ways that water can be delivered to the surface: micrometeorite impacts can carry water from space or excavate water from below the surface, and potentially, water could be created directly on surface minerals by implantation of hydrogen from the solar wind. Still, until very recently, scientists did not expect water to be present on most of the surface of the Moon.

In 1998, Dr. William C. Feldman and his colleagues showed that water ice might be present in permanently shadowed craters at the poles of the Moon. They detected the presence of hydrogen in the upper half-meter (1.5 feet) of the lunar surface, which was most likely evidence of water ice. This discovery was debated in the scientific community as missions to study the lunar surface waned and further data was unavailable—until, in 2009, the Lunar Crater Observation and Sensing Satellite (LCROSS) jettisoned one of its empty propellant tanks in a controlled collision to impact an area of the Moon that lay in permanent shadow to test for the presence of ice. When the tank hit, it created a plume that was observed by both the Lunar Reconnaissance Orbiter (LRO) and the LCROSS spacecraft as well as telescopes on Earth. Tremendous amounts of data were captured from the observed plume, including signatures of water ice and other volatiles.

Also in 2009, researchers reviewing data from three separate spacecraft—Chandrayaan-1, Deep Impact, and Cassini—extracted a hydration signature throughout the whole lunar surface. This was a surprise to the lunar science community, particularly because this meant that water may be present on boiling-hot sunlit portions of the Moon. However, the instruments gathering the spectral data weren't designed to look for water, and did not have enough resolution in the 3-micron band of infrared light for researchers to distinguish between the absorption features of hydroxyl (OH), H_{2}O, and water ice. Lunar Trailblazer's instruments were specifically designed to detect and distinguish between these three forms of water.

== Spacecraft ==
The Lunar Trailblazer spacecraft was built and tested by Lockheed Martin. It used two deployable solar arrays, which provided 280 watts of power, and a chemical propulsion system. With its solar panels fully extended it was 3.5 m (11 ft) long. The spacecraft weighed 200 kg (440 lb). It carried two science instruments, High Resolution Volatiles and Minerals Moon Mapper (HVM^{3}), and the Lunar Thermal Mapper (LTM). HVM^{3} was provided by JPL and the LTM was provided by the University of Oxford.

== Science payload ==
There were two scientific instruments on the Lunar Trailblazer satellite, totaling 20 kg (44 lb). The High Resolution Volatiles and Minerals Moon Mapper (HVM^{3}) was to gather and map shortwave infrared spectral data of the lunar surface. Simultaneously, Lunar Thermal Mapper (LTM) was to acquire midwave infrared data. Together, the two instruments were to create a simultaneous map of the surface mineral composition, temperature, and forms of lunar water, each measuring at least one thousand targets on the lunar surface over the course of the satellite's one-year primary mission.

=== High Resolution Volatiles and Minerals Moon Mapper (HVM^{3}) ===
The HVM^{3} instrument was developed by the Maturation of Instruments for Solar System Exploration (MatISSE) program, and was manufactured by the Jet Propulsion Laboratory. It was a pushbroom short-wave infrared imaging spectrometer based on the design of the M^{3} instrument, which was one of the instruments to first find evidence of hydration in sunlit regions of the Moon. HVM^{3} had a spectral range from 0.6 to 3.6 microns—it was designed to work with high sensitivity (10 nm resolution) right at the center of water's key wavelength region in infrared light (from 2.5 to 3.5 microns) with high enough spectral resolution to differentiate between forms of water. Each pixel in an image from HVM^{3} could cover 50–90 meters (160–300 ft) of the lunar surface.

=== Lunar Thermal Mapper (LTM) ===
The LTM instrument was designed and built by the University of Oxford. With eleven narrow channels between 7 and 10 microns and resolution smaller than 0.5 microns, it was to acquire multispectral images to characterize the Si-O stretch in silicates to derive mineralogical composition. At the same time, using the four broadband channels from 6 up to 100 microns, it could derive surface temperature with a precision of 5 K (9°F/5°C) in the range of 110–400 K (-262 to 260°F/-163 to 126°C). The pixel size of LTM was 40–70 meters.

== Mission Failure and Anomaly Review ==
In August 2025, the NASA Science Mission Directorate convened an Anomaly Review Board (ARB) to investigate the technical and organisational factors contributing to the loss of the spacecraft. The ARB identified a convergence of pre-launch, post-launch, and operational issues, concluding that no single anomaly was fatal but that their combined effect exceeded the mission’s ability to recover.

=== Solar array phasing error ===
The ARB found that a sign error in the flight software’s definition of the solar-array gimbal axes caused the arrays to orient away from the Sun during safing, repeatedly returning the spacecraft to a non-viable attitude after power resets. A full, test-like-you-fly solar-array phasing test using the final flight software and operational products was never performed, allowing this error to remain undetected before launch.

=== Power-system resets and fault-protection interactions ===
Investigators reported that the electrical power system’s over-voltage protection threshold had been set incorrectly, leading to false triggers and repeated power-supply resets. Fault-protection behaviour was implemented partly through sequences rather than code and was not validated as a fully integrated system, contributing to unexpected interactions between safing responses and command sequences. These behaviours produced multiple resets and prevented the spacecraft from maintaining a stable configuration.

=== Radio configuration and loss of command capability ===
A commercial off-the-shelf radio occasionally booted into an improper configuration after power resets, preventing reception of commands despite the presence of a detectable carrier. During a several-hour window in which commanding might have corrected the spacecraft’s attitude and updated key parameters, the misconfigured radio prevented uplink, significantly limiting recovery options.

=== Battery state-of-charge collapse ===
Repeated resets combined with persistent off-Sun pointing led to a rapid decline in the spacecraft’s battery state of charge. When the radio eventually initialized correctly, the remaining power margin was insufficient for recovery, and the spacecraft experienced a final low-power brown-out.

=== Software and testing gaps ===
The ARB concluded that several critical elements of the flight software and fault-protection logic were not tested in their final, integrated configuration prior to launch. While subsystem-level checks were conducted, final updates to safe-mode parameters, over-voltage limits, and command sequences were introduced late in the campaign and were not exercised through complete system-level simulations. Limitations in ground-support equipment and schedule pressure further constrained integrated testing, allowing configuration errors and unanticipated interactions between software, fault-protection responses, and the power system to remain undiscovered until after launch.

=== Organisational and programme factors ===
The review highlighted differing interpretations of NASA posture on Class D risk tolerance across participating institutions, limited staffing depth, and schedule pressure stemming from rideshare constraints. These factors reduced the scope of integrated testing and oversight, contributing to the mission’s vulnerability to coupled software- and hardware-driven anomalies.

== See also ==
- List of missions to the Moon
- LunaH-Map, a similar mission that is also part of the SIMPLEx program
