= UoSAT-12 =

Amateur radio satellite

- Operator: University of Surrey
- COSPAR ID: 1999-021A
- SATCAT no.: 25693

Spacecraft properties
- Manufacturer: SSTL

Start of mission
- Launch date: 21 April 1999, 05:00 UTC
- Rocket: Dnepr
- Launch site: Baikonur 109/95

Orbital parameters
- Reference system: Geocentric
- Regime: Sun-synchronous

UoSAT-12 is a British satellite in Low Earth Orbit. It is the twelfth satellite in the University of Surrey series and was designed and built by Surrey Satellite Technology Ltd. (SSTL). It was launched into orbit in April 1999 on board a Dnepr rocket from Yasny Russia.

== Mission ==
UoSAT-12 was an experimental mission used to demonstrate and test a number of new technologies. Imaging cameras and a high-speed 1 Mbit/s S-band downlink (the MERLION experiment) were tested. An Internet Protocol stack was uploaded to the satellite, allowing experiments in extending the Internet to space to be made by NASA Goddard as part of its Operating Missions as Nodes on the Internet (OMNI) effort.

These now-proven technologies were later adopted by SSTL in the design of its Disaster Monitoring Constellation satellites.
