= UoSAT-1 =

British amateur radio satellite

- Mission type: OSCAR
- Operator: University of Surrey
- COSPAR ID: 1981-100B
- SATCAT no.: 12888

Spacecraft properties
- Launch mass: 54 kilograms (119 lb)

Start of mission
- Launch date: 6 October 1981, 11:27 UTC
- Rocket: Delta 2310 D-157
- Launch site: Vandenberg SLC-2W

Orbital parameters
- Reference system: Geocentric
- Regime: Low Earth
- Perigee altitude: 372 kilometres (231 mi)
- Apogee altitude: 374 kilometres (232 mi)
- Inclination: 97.6°
- Period: 92 minutes

UoSAT-1, also known as UoSAT-OSCAR 9 (UO-9), was a British amateur radio satellite which orbited Earth. It was built at the University of Surrey and launched into low Earth orbit on 6 October 1981. It exceeded its anticipated two-year orbital lifespan by six years, having received signals on 13 October 1989, before re-entering the atmosphere.

This was the first of several UoSAT satellites; followed by UoSAT-2.

== Mission ==
Like its successor UoSAT-2 it carried a CCD camera and a Digitalker speech synthesiser, and transmitted telemetry data on a 145.825 https://www.worldradiohistory.com/UK/British-Institution-of-Radio-Engineers/1982/TREE-1982-08-09.pdf (UoSAT-2 transmitted at 145.826) beacon at 1200 baud using asynchronous AFSK.

The Astrid package sold by British firm MM Microwave, consisting of a fixed frequency VHF receiver set and software for the BBC Micro, could display the telemetry frames from either UoSAT-1 or UoSAT-2. UoSAT-1's solar arrays were of an experimental design reused for UoSAT-2.

== Computers and Data Processing ==
The primary computer for the satellite was the RCA 1802 microprocessor. A secondary microprocessor was also employed, the "F100L" (a Ferranti 16-bit processor). Memory was 16K of DRAM.
