= UK-DMC 2 =

British remote sensing satellite

- Mission type: Optical imaging Disaster monitoring
- Operator: BNSC (2009-2010); UKSA (2010); DMC International Imaging
- COSPAR ID: 2009-041C
- SATCAT no.: 35683
- Mission duration: 5 years (expected)

Spacecraft properties
- Bus: SSTL-100
- Manufacturer: SSTL
- Launch mass: 120 kilograms (260 lb)

Start of mission
- Launch date: 29 July 2009, 18:46:29 UTC
- Rocket: Dnepr
- Launch site: Baikonur 109/95
- Contractor: Kosmotras

Orbital parameters
- Reference system: Geocentric
- Regime: Sun-synchronous
- Perigee altitude: 665 kilometres (413 mi)
- Apogee altitude: 667 kilometres (414 mi)
- Inclination: 97.95 degrees
- Period: 97.92 minutes
- Epoch: 25 January 2015, 04:51:21 UTC

UK-DMC 2 is a British Earth imaging satellite which is operated by DMC International Imaging. It was constructed by Surrey Satellite Technology, based on the SSTL-100 satellite bus. It is part of Britain's contribution to the Disaster Monitoring Constellation, which is coordinated by DMC International Imaging. It is the successor to the UK-DMC satellite.

== Mission ==
UK DMC-2 was launched into a Sun-synchronous low Earth orbit. The launch was conducted by ISC Kosmotras, using a Dnepr carrier rocket, with DubaiSat-1 being the primary payload. UK-DMC 2, along with the Deimos-1, Nanosat 1B, AprizeSat-3 and AprizeSat-4 satellites, were the rocket's secondary payload. The launch occurred at 18:46 GMT on 29 July 2009, with the rocket lifting off from Site 109/95 at the Baikonur Cosmodrome in Kazakhstan.

The satellite has a mass of 120 kilograms (260 lb) and a design life of five years. It carries a multi-spectral imager with a resolution of 22 metres (72 ft) and 660 kilometres (410 mi) of swath, operating in green, red and near infrared spectra.

The satellite is also known as Blue Peter 1, and its construction and launch were followed by children's television.

== See also ==
- UK-DMC 3
- 2009 in spaceflight
- UK-DMC2 Mission pages from manufacturer SSTL
