= Nadezhda (satellite) =

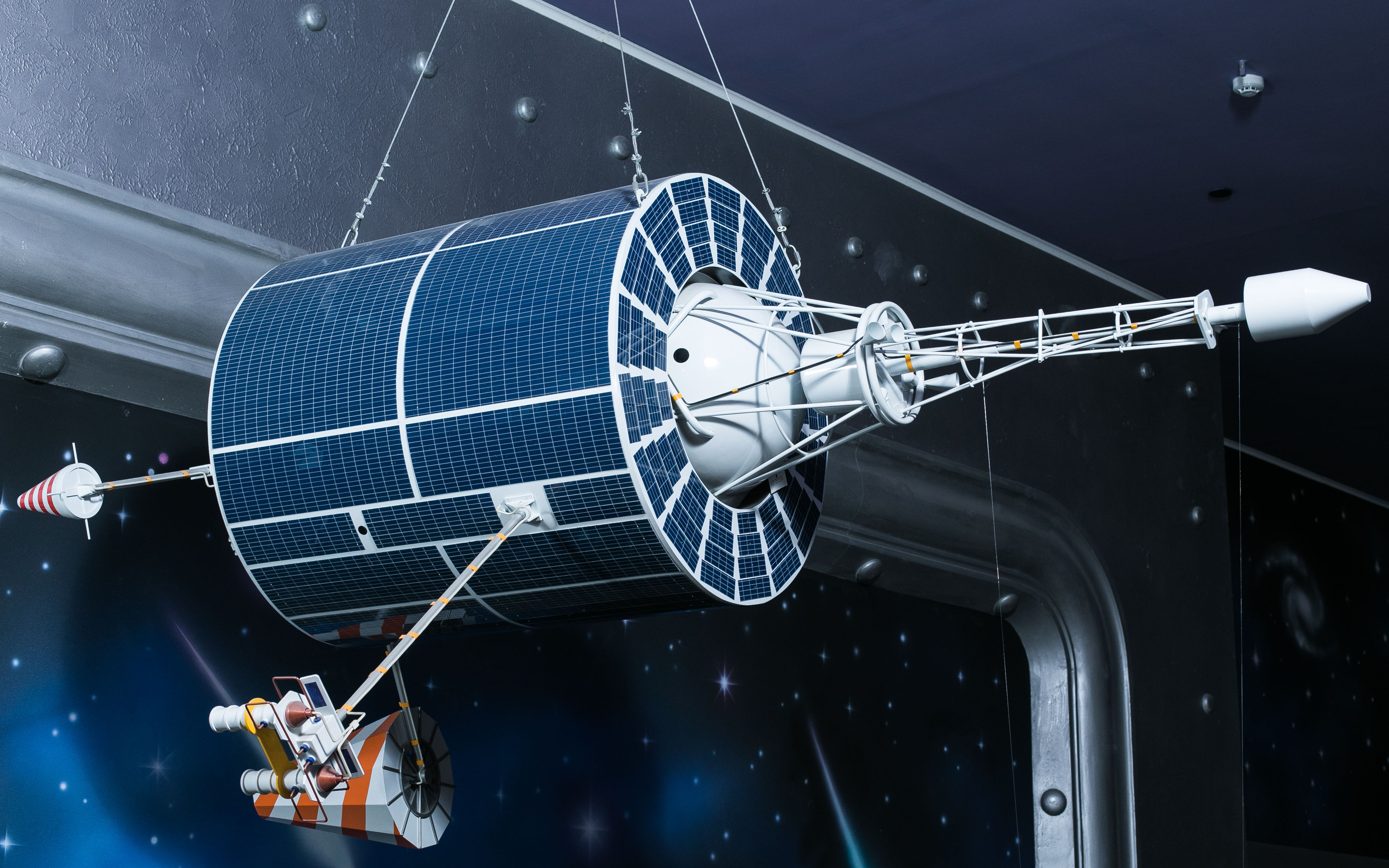
Scale model of Nadezhda satellite at Memorial Museum of Cosmonautics.

Nadezhda (Russian: Надежда, means Hope in English) was a civilian satellite navigation system, part of the space segment of International Cospas-Sarsat Programme.

== Overview ==
The system consisted of four satellites, each with a mass of 870 kg, diameter of 2m and length of 3.5. They orbit at an inclination of 89 degrees and an altitude of 1,000 km.

The first three satellites received designations Kosmos 1383 (1982), Kosmos 1447 (1983), and Kosmos 1574 (1984).

The satellites were first introduced in 1989. A newer version, called Nadezhda-M is reportedly smaller than the original one. It was due to be replaced by the Sterkh satellites. Nadezhda-M6 was launched on 28 June 2001. Nadezhda-M7 was launched on 26 September 2002. The satellites were designed and manufactured by NPO PM.
