= DMC International Imaging =

DMC International Imaging Ltd
- Company type: Subsidiary
- Industry: Earth observation
- Founded: 5 August 2004
- Defunct: 1 June 2021
- Headquarters: Guildford, Surrey, United Kingdom

DMC International Imaging (DMCii) is the company that manages the Disaster Monitoring Constellation for the International Charter for Space and Major Disasters. It also sells satellite imaging services under contract and manages the operations of spacecraft such as UK-DMC 1 & UK-DMC 2. DMCII is a wholly owned subsidiary of Surrey Satellite Technology Ltd (SSTL). It recently struck a space deal with Beijing-based 21AT to build three high-resolution Earth observation satellites to map the growth of China.

== History ==
DMCii was incorporated in 2004 in Guildford, Surrey, as a subsidiary of SSTL.

Company was struck off and dissolved in June 2021.

== Activities ==
The company coordinated tasking and data from the multi national DMC for civil and humanitarian applications.

== See also ==
- Disaster Monitoring Constellation
- Surrey Satellite Technology
