= UK-DMC =

British remote sensing satellite

- Mission type: Optical imaging Disaster monitoring
- Operator: BNSC (2003-2010); UKSA (2010-2011)
- COSPAR ID: 2003-042D
- SATCAT no.: 27942
- Mission duration: 8 years

Spacecraft properties
- Bus: SSTL-100
- Manufacturer: SSTL
- Launch mass: 88 kilograms (194 lb)

Start of mission
- Launch date: 27 September 2003, 06:11:44 UTC
- Rocket: Kosmos-3M
- Launch site: Plesetsk 132/1

End of mission
- Disposal: Decommissioned
- Deactivated: November 2011

Orbital parameters
- Reference system: Geocentric
- Regime: Sun-synchronous
- Perigee altitude: 676 kilometres (420 mi)
- Apogee altitude: 695 kilometres (432 mi)
- Inclination: degrees
- Period: 98.5 minutes
- Epoch: 27 September 2003, 02:12:00 UTC

UK-DMC or UK-DMC 1, also known as BNSCSAT-1, was a British satellite that formed part of the Disaster Monitoring Constellation (DMC). It was built by Surrey Satellite Technology, who operated it via DMC International Imaging on behalf of the British National Space Centre and later the UK Space Agency. It was launched alongside other DMC satellites on a Kosmos-3M rocket from Plesetsk on 27 September 2003, and was retired from service in November 2011.

== Mission ==
As well as carrying remote sensing imaging sensors, the satellite also carries experimental payloads: the CLEO Cisco router in Low Earth Orbit, an experiment demonstrating GNSS reflectometry, and a water resistojet propulsion system. The UK-DMC demonstrated the first use of the Interplanetary Internet in space. In November 2010, nearing the end of its operational life, UK-DMC was placed into a lower orbit.

== Deactivation ==
After 8 years in orbit, daily operations of the satellite ceased in November 2011. Operations have been taken over by the satellite's successor, UK-DMC 2.

The satellite is now a part of the growing space junk in Low Earth Orbit, which will decay in the Earth's atmosphere sometime in the future.
