= LUMIO (space mission) =

Planned lunar exploration mission

- Names: Lunar Meteoroid Impact Observer
- Mission type: Lunar exploration
- Operator: ESA
- Mission duration: 12 months (planned)

Spacecraft properties
- Spacecraft type: 12U CubeSat
- Manufacturer: Argotec
- Launch mass: 28 kg

Start of mission
- Launch date: 2028 (planned)

Moon orbiter
- Orbits: Halo orbit

LUMIO (LUnar Meteoroid Impact Observer) is a planned ESA lunar exploration mission expected to launch as early as 2028. The main goal of the mission is to detect, quantify, and characterize the impacts of near-Earth meteoroids on the lunar far side. The spacecraft consists of a 12-U CubeSat that will operate in a halo orbit around the L2 Lagrange point of the Earth-Moon system. It is an autonomous mission of the European Space Agency and is currently being developed by an international consortium which includes Politecnico di Milano, Argotec, Leonardo, IMT, Nautilus, and S&T Norway.

== Science ==
Near-Earth meteoroids are fragments of asteroids and comets with sizes ranging from micrometers to meters. These objects impact the Earth and Moon on a daily basis. It is estimated that ~33 tons of these fragments get attracted into Earth's atmosphere every day. However, due to the extreme heat of the atmospheric entry, only a few manage to reach the surface. Since the Moon has no atmosphere, lunar impacts are much more frequent and constitute a constant threat to human and robotic operations on the surface.

When a meteoroid impacts the ground, most of its kinetic energy is suddenly converted into heat which partially vaporizes the impacting mass and scatters secondary debris all around the site. If an impact occurs where the surface is in umbra, it appears as bright flash, which can be detected by optical telescopes on the Earth. The intensity of the flashes can be measured to determine the kinetic energy of the meteoroid. However, observations from Earth must be performed at nighttime and are often disturbed by atmospheric events. Moreover, only those impacts that occur on the observable face of the Moon can be detected. LUMIO will have a constant and unobstructed view on the lunar far side from its orbit around the L2 Earth-Moon Lagrangian point. Since the observation periods (i.e., when the surface is in shadow) are opposite with respect to Earth, LUMIO will considerably increase the monitored portion of the Moon's surface. The measurements coming from the spacecraft, coupled with those from Earth, will provide a more detailed statistics about the probability and distribution of meteoroids impacts on the Moon.

The main scientific payload of LUMIO is a custom-designed optical camera, called LUMIO-Cam, which will observe the lunar surface in umbra to detect the flashes caused by asteroid impacts. Scientific data from the mission will be integrated with observations from the Earth to elaborate the first complete and accurate model of meteoroids flux in the lunar environment.

== Spacecraft ==
LUMIO will be a 12-U Cubesat with dimensions of 30x20x20 cm, having a maximum wet mass of 28 kg. The platform will be manufactured by Argotec, an Italian aerospace engineering company based in Turin. Argotec has previous experiences in deep-space CubeSats, having designed LICIACube, the companion of NASA's DART spacecraft, and Argomoon, one of the secondary payloads of the Artemis-1 mission.

The spacecraft will be equipped with a propulsion system in order to perform the space maneuvers needed to reach the final orbit and small station-keeping corrections. Extendable solar arrays produced by IMT will provide enough power during all the phases of the mission. IMT will also manufacture the X-band transponder needed for establishing communications to the Earth and performing navigation routines.

=== Camera ===
The LUMIO-Cam is the main scientific instrument of the LUMIO mission. It will be designed and manufactured by Leonardo, in their facilities of Campi Bisenzio (Florence). The camera will have a resolution of 1024 x 1024 pixels and will be able to acquire images in both the visual and near-infrared spectrums. The refresh rate will be of 15 frames per second in order to detect flashes with duration as fast as 30 ms.

The camera will have a focal length of 127 mm, obtaining a Field-Of-View of 6.0º. This angular size is just enough to perform full disk observations of the Moon, which has an apparent size of 5.6° at the closest point of the trajectory.

When more than 50% of the Moon's surface is illuminated, the glare deriving from the albedo is too intense for observing the flashes on the unlit portion. Due to this, the surface monitoring will be possible only 50% of the time, in 15-days time windows. The spacecraft will perform station-keeping maneuvers and secondary scientific activities while waiting for the next monitoring window.

The amount of data generated by the payload during the scientific phases is close to 5 TB/day. Since this value is too large to be transferred back to Earth, the images will be preliminarly processed on board. Only the images with detected impact flashes will be sent to the ground-stations, effectively reducing the required data transfer to approximately 1 MB/day.

== Mission profile ==
=== Orbit ===
The L2 Lagrangian point is specific zone of equilibrium in the combined gravitational field of the Earth-Moon system. At the L2 point, the gravitational attractions of the two celestial objects are combined. Due to this, it exists a particular family of three-dimensional trajectories, called halo orbits, which a satellite can exploit to remain in the vicinity of the Moon without orbiting it. The LUMIO spacecraft will fly on one of these trajectories, having the possibility of constantly observing the lunar far-side from a distance ranging between 36,000 and 86,000 km.

=== Mission phases ===
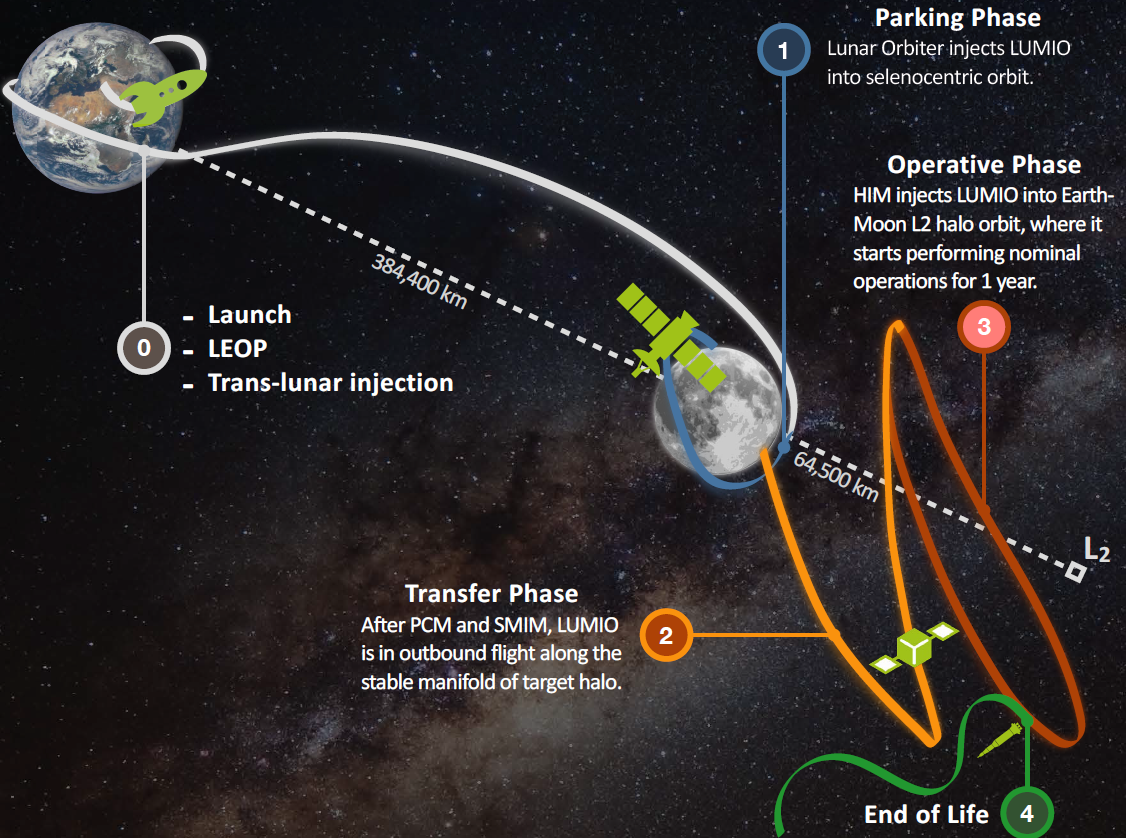
Phases of the LUMIO mission.

The LUMIO mission will be divided into four phases:

1. Parking phase. The spacecraft is launched as a secondary payload and gets released into selenocentric orbit by the carrier. During the 14 days of this phase the CubeSat will begin commissioning.
2. Transfer phase. LUMIO performs a stable manifold injection maneuver (SMIM) and begins the transfer towards the L2 point. This phase has a duration of 14 days.
3. Operative phase. The spacecraft executes the halo injection maneuver (HIM) and is inserted into the operational orbit. During this 1-year phase, LUMIO will perform all its scientific tasks and relay the data back to Earth. Multiple station-keeping maneuvers will take place to keep the satellite in the nominal trajectory.
4. End of life. At the end of the operative phase, LUMIO will perform a final maneuver for the safe disposal of the spacecraft.

== Navigation experiment ==
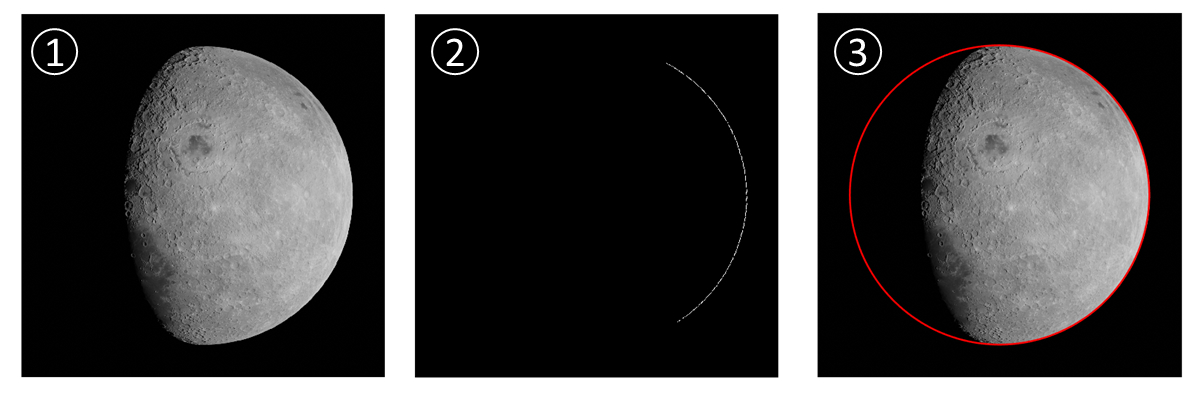
The three phases of the image processing for full disk navigation: image acquisition (1), edge detection (2), ellipse fitting (3).

The secondary objective of the LUMIO mission is to demonstrate the possibility of performing navigation routines in complete autonomy, without communicating with ground stations. The images from the LUMIO-Cam will be processed by optical navigation algorithms to provide an estimate of the position of the satellite with respect to the Moon. The technique that will be used is called full-disk navigation and It is expected to achieve an operational accuracy of less than 100 km.

With this technique each picture is processed to find the edges of the moon. Then, an ellipse is fitted to reconstruct the location of full lunar limb in the image. The fitted ellipse is the bi-dimensional projection of the three-dimensional Moon ellipsoid onto the image plane. Since the characteristics of the camera and the dimensions of the Moon ellipsoid are known, the ellipse points can be used as a state measurements in a Kalman filter.

== See also ==
- List of missions to the Moon
- List of objects at Lagrange points
- List of European Space Agency programmes and missions
- List of ESA CubeSats
- Other European deep space CubeSat missions:
  - HENON — launch in 2027, a space weather mission, ESA's first ever stand-alone deep space CubeSat
  - M-Argo — launch in 2027, a mission to an asteroid
  - VMMO — launch in 2028, a mission to map the distribution of water ice and ilmenite on the Moon
  - Satis — launch in 2030, a mission to an asteroid
