= P3D =

P3D may refer to:

- Phase 3D, the amateur radio satellite later known as OSCAR 40
- Lockheed Martin Prepar3D, a simulation platform
- Douglas XP3D, a prototype American patrol flying boat of the 1930s
- Persona 3: Dancing in Moonlight, a 2018 rhythm game
