= VMMO =

CubeSat Lunar orbiter by ESA

- Mission type: Exploration of the Moon
- Operator: ESA

Spacecraft properties
- Spacecraft type: 16U CubeSat

Start of mission
- Launch date: NET 2028

Orbital parameters
- Regime: Polar frozen orbit

The Lunar Volatile and Mineralogy Mapping Orbiter (VMMO) is a future uncrewed lunar orbiter in the form of a 16U CubeSat, under development by the European Space Agency (ESA). The spacecraft will map the distribution of water ice and ilmenite (FeTiO_{3}) in the lunar South Pole region, as well as monitor the cis-lunar environment. It will carry a multi-wavelength lidar, a radiation monitor, and a GNSS receiver. VMMO is expected to launch in 2028.

== See also ==
- List of European Space Agency programmes and missions
- Other European deep space CubeSat missions:
  - HENON — launch in 2026, a space weather mission, ESA's first ever stand-alone deep space CubeSat
  - M-Argo — launch in 2027, a mission to an asteroid
  - LUMIO — launch in 2027, a mission to characterize the impacts of near-Earth meteoroids on the lunar far side
  - Satis — launch in 2030, a mission to an asteroid
