= ARTE =

Arte or ARTE can refer to:

- Art in Italian
- Arte, a public Franco-German TV network
- Arte France, A French audiovisual company
- ARTE (Thermal Exchange), a project intended to create "Thermal Exchange", an experiment for the International Space Station
- Arte River, a river in Australia
- Nokia 8800 Arte, a luxury mobile phone
- Arte Johnson (1929–2019), American comic actor
- Arte (manga), a Japanese manga series

== See also ==
- Artear, an Argentine media company
