= AMSAT-OSCAR 7 =

1974 amateur radio satellite

AMSAT-OSCAR 7 (AO-7)
- Artist’s rendering of AO-7
- Mission type: Amateur radio satellite
- Operator: AMSAT
- COSPAR ID: 1974-089B
- SATCAT no.: 7530
- Website: Official website
- Mission duration: Planned: 10 years Elapsed: 51 years, 9 months, 11 days

Spacecraft properties
- Launch mass: 28.8 kilograms (63 lb)
- Dimensions: 36.0 cm x 42.4 cm octahedron

Start of mission
- Launch date: 15 November 1974, 17:11 UTC
- Rocket: Delta 2310
- Launch site: Vandenberg SLC-2W

Orbital parameters
- Reference system: Geocentric
- Regime: Low Earth
- Perigee altitude: 1,447.5 kilometers (899 Mi)
- Apogee altitude: 1,465.6 kilometers (910 Mi)
- Inclination: 101.59 degrees
- Period: 114.9 Minutes
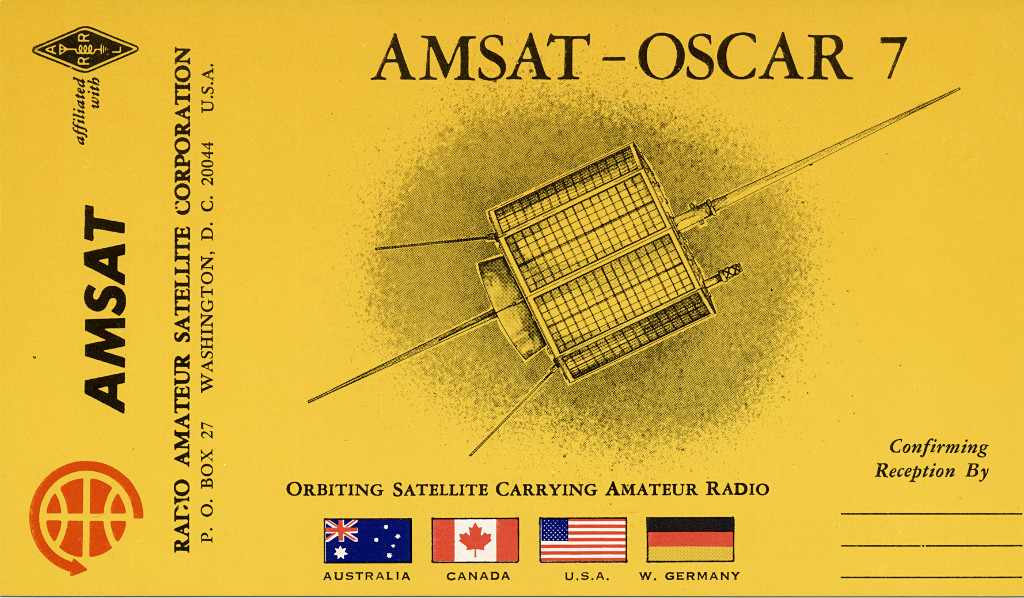
- OSCAR

AMSAT-OSCAR 7, or AO-7, is the second Phase 2 amateur radio satellite constructed by the Radio Amateur Satellite Corporation (AMSAT). It was launched into Low Earth Orbit on November 15, 1974 and remained operational until a battery failure in 1981. After 21 years of apparent silence, the satellite was heard again on June 21, 2002 – 27 years after launch. At that time the public learned that the satellite had remained intermittently functional and was used surreptitiously for communication by the anticommunist opposition Fighting Solidarity during martial law in Poland.

AO-7 is the oldest operational satellite, be it government, scientific, military or commercial. It carries two amateur radio transponders. Its "Mode A" transponder has an uplink on the 2-meter band and a downlink on the 10-meter band. The "Mode B" transponder has an uplink on the 70-centimeter band and a downlink on the 2-meter band. The satellite also carries four beacons which are designed to operate on the 10-meter, 2-meter, 70-centimeter and 13-centimeter bands. The 13-cm beacon was never activated due to a change in international treaties.

AMSAT reported AO-7 still operational on June 25, 2015, with reliable power only from its solar panels; the report stated the cause of the 21-year outage was a short circuit in the battery and the restoration of service was due to its becoming an open circuit. The satellite eclipses on every orbit during the northern summer and autumn; the rest of the year it is in continuous sunlight and alternates between transmission modes A and B. All transponders and beacons are operational.

== Build ==
AO-7 was the second Phase 2 satellite (Phase II-B). At launch, the satellite had a mass of 28.6 kg (63 lb) and it was placed into a 1,444×1,459 km orbit. It is shaped as an octagonal prism 360 mm high and 424 mm in diameter. It has a circularly-polarized, canted turnstile VHF/UHF antenna system and HF dipole. Four radio masts mounted at 90 degree intervals on the base of the satellite and two experimental repeater systems provided store-and-forward for Morse code and teletype messages ("codestore") as it orbited around the world. The Mode-B transponder was designed and built by Karl Meinzer, DJ4ZC and Werner Haas, DJ5KQ. The Mode-B transponder was the first using “HELAPS” (High Efficient Linear Amplification by Parametric Synthesis) technology and was developed by Dr. Karl Meinzer as part of his Ph.D. research. AO-7 has redundant command decoders of a design similar to the unit proven highly successful in AMSAT-OSCAR 6. The decoder has provisions for 35 separate functions, and is designed to provide a reliable means of controlling the emissions of the repeaters, beacons and other experiments aboard the spacecraft.

== Firsts ==
AO-7 demonstrated several uses of new technologies and operations

- First satellite-to-satellite relay, through AO-6.
- Early demonstrations of low-budget medical data relay and Doppler location of ground transmitters for search-and-rescue operations were carried out using this satellite.
- The Mode-B transponder was the first using "HELAPS" (High Efficient Linear Amplification by Parametric Synthesis) technology developed by Dr. Karl Meinzer as part of his Ph.D.
- First to fly a battery charge regulator.

== Legal issues ==
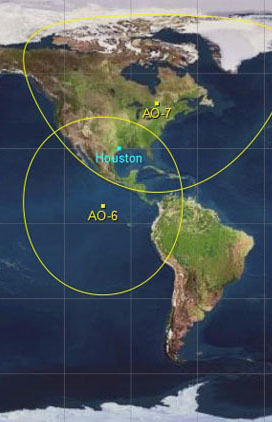
constellation allowing intersatellite communication from the United States with AMSAT-OSCAR 6 and AMSAT-OSCAR 7.

The uplink frequency predates the WARC 1979 allocation of 435-438 MHz by the ITU for the Amateur Satellite Service which places the uplink in the 70cm weak signal segment. Additionally, the IARU bandplan has the 432.1 MHz range (which is used for mode B uplink) marked for "weak signal" in all three Regions. Accessing the Mode B uplink is permitted in the United States under a waiver from the FCC.

== Use by Polish anticommunist opposition ==
In the summer of 1982 the Fighting Solidarity in Wrocław learned that AO-7 became periodically functional, when its solar panels got enough sunlight to power up the satellite. It was then used to communicate with Solidarity activists in other Polish cities and to send messages to the West. Satellite communication was invaluable at that time, as the regular telephone network was tapped by the government and shut down when martial law was imposed in December 1981. Ham radios were not of much use as they were easy to track. On the other hand, a satellite link required highly directional antennas which were impossible to track by the regime. In 2002 AMSAT-UK co-founder Pat Gowen (G3IOR), inspired by the history of Fighting Solidarity, attempted to communicate with AO-7 and confirmed it to be operational.

== Current status ==
As of July 2026, contacts with AO-7 are reported daily.
