= SpaceQuest =

American space company

AAC SpaceQuest (also known as SpaceQuest, Ltd.)
- Type: Subsidiary
- Industry: spacecraft, engineering, computer hardware, consulting ground systems
- Founded: 1994
- Headquarters: Fairfax, Virginia, USA
- Products: spacecraft and spacecraft components
- Parent: AAC Clyde Space
- Website: www.spacequest.com

AAC SpaceQuest (also known as SpaceQuest, Ltd.), a wholly owned subsidiary of AAC Clyde Space, is a spacecraft components and engineering company located in Fairfax, Virginia, which focuses on the operations of small satellites.

The company designs, develops, constructs, launches, and operates microsatellites and spacecraft components. SpaceQuest qualifies its components for use in space by flying them on its own satellites. They also operate a fleet of low earth orbiting satellites, which are used for remote monitoring as well as tracking the location and status of large vessels at sea.

SpaceQuest's customers include US and foreign universities, NASA, the US Air Force, the Canadian Space Agency, commercial aerospace companies, and foreign developers of microsatellites. Some of their projects include:

- FalconSAT 3 & 5, satellites developed by cadets at the U.S. Air Force Academy.
- AprizeSat 1, 2, 3, 4, 5, 8, 9, 10 commercial communications satellites for SpaceQuest
- ExactView 6,7
- AO-51, amateur radio satellite.
- Genesis I and Genesis II, inflatable space habitats Bigelow Aerospace.
- Thea and Brio, launched in December 2018 on Spaceflight's SSO-A mission, a pair of 3U cubesats hosting experimental payloads for commercial customers.

On October 15, 2020, AAC Clyde Space announced that an agreement had been reached to acquire all shares in SpaceQuest Ltd. The acquisition was completed in December 2020.
