= David Avino =

Italian aerospace entrepreneur and engineer

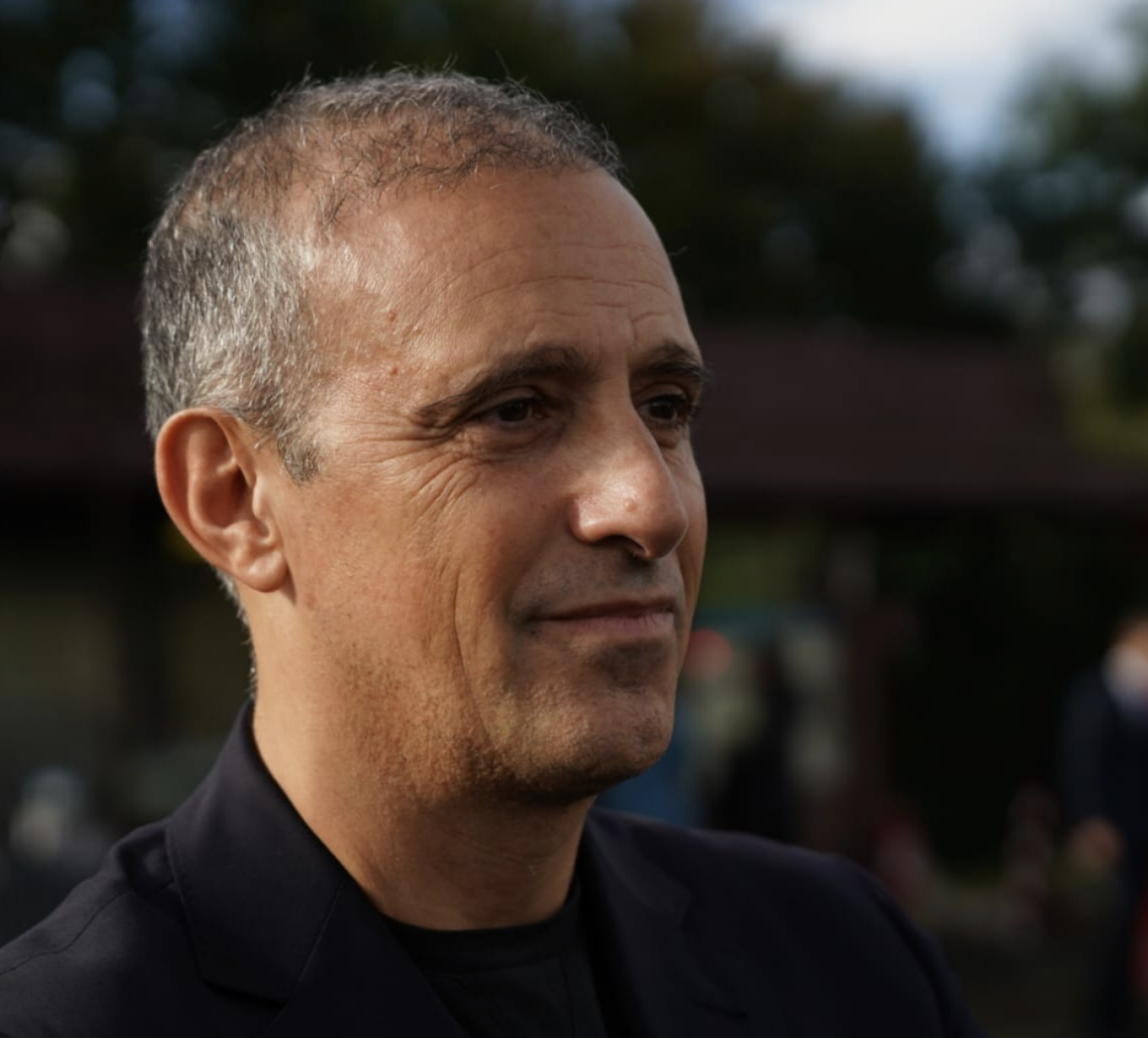
- Avino in 2024
- Born: 21 February 1971 (age 55); Foligno, Italy
- Citizenship: Italian
- Education: Military Academy of Modena; University of Turin
- Occupations: Entrepreneur, aerospace engineer
- Known for: Founder and CEO of Argotec, ISSpresso, LICIACube
- Title: CEO of Argotec

David Avino (born 21 February 1971) is an Italian aerospace entrepreneur and aerospace engineer who founded Argotec and serves as its chief executive officer.

== Early life and education ==
Avino was born in Foligno in 1971. He studied at the University of Turin, earning degrees in computer science and strategic sciences. He later attended the Military Academy of Modena and served as an officer in the Paratroopers Brigade "Folgore" of the Italian Army until 1998.

== Career ==
=== European Space Agency ===
From 2002 to 2008, Avino worked for the European Space Agency (ESA). During that period, he worked at the European Astronaut Centre in Cologne as an instructor involved in astronaut training activities. According to company and interview profiles, his work included collaboration with NASA and Roscosmos on human spaceflight activities.

=== Argotec ===
In 2008, Avino founded Argotec in Turin. The company develops microsatellites and space systems, including technologies for human spaceflight. In an interview published by La Stampa in February 2025, Avino said the company was targeting revenue of €100 million by 2026.

In 2024, Argotec opened SpacePark Argotec in San Mauro Torinese. Press coverage described the project as involving a €25 million investment in the redevelopment of the former Cartiera Burgo site, originally designed by architect Oscar Niemeyer. In May 2024, the site was visited by Italian Prime Minister Giorgia Meloni.

== Projects ==
=== ISSpresso ===
Avino was involved in the development of ISSpresso, a capsule-based espresso machine designed for use in microgravity. The machine was developed with Lavazza and the Italian Space Agency and was installed on the International Space Station in 2015.

=== Satellite missions ===
Avino has been associated with several Argotec satellite projects:

- LICIACube: an Italian CubeSat contributed by the Italian Space Agency that photographed the aftermath of NASA's DART impact on Dimorphos.
- ArgoMoon: a satellite built by Argotec and launched on the Artemis 1 mission to observe the deployment of secondary payloads from the Orion/Space Launch System mission profile.
- IRIDE: Argotec has participated in the development of satellites for IRIDE, the Italian Earth-observation constellation programme.

== Recognition ==
Avino and Argotec have been cited in connection with several recognitions, including a NASA award in 2016 for an International Space Station experiment, and the 2023 American Institute of Aeronautics and Astronautics "Mission of the Year" recognition for the LICIACube team. He was also described by Yahoo Finance Italia as having been named "Person of the Year" in 2023 by the Turin edition of Corriere della Sera.
