= Satis (spacecraft) =

Proposed European CubeSat mission to an asteroid

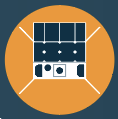
- Mission type: Planetary defense & asteroid exploration
- Operator: ESA

Spacecraft properties
- Spacecraft type: 12U CubeSat

Start of mission
- Launch date: 2030 (planned)

Satis, also known as Asteroid Inspector, is a proposed planetary defense deep-space CubeSat mission under development by the European Space Agency (ESA) the Space Safety Programme (S2P). If approved, Satis will launch in 2030 to study an asteroid. Satis will be a 12-unit CubeSat based on a similar European mission M-ARGO. As of February 2026, Satis was not mentioned in materials about future missions planned by S2P.

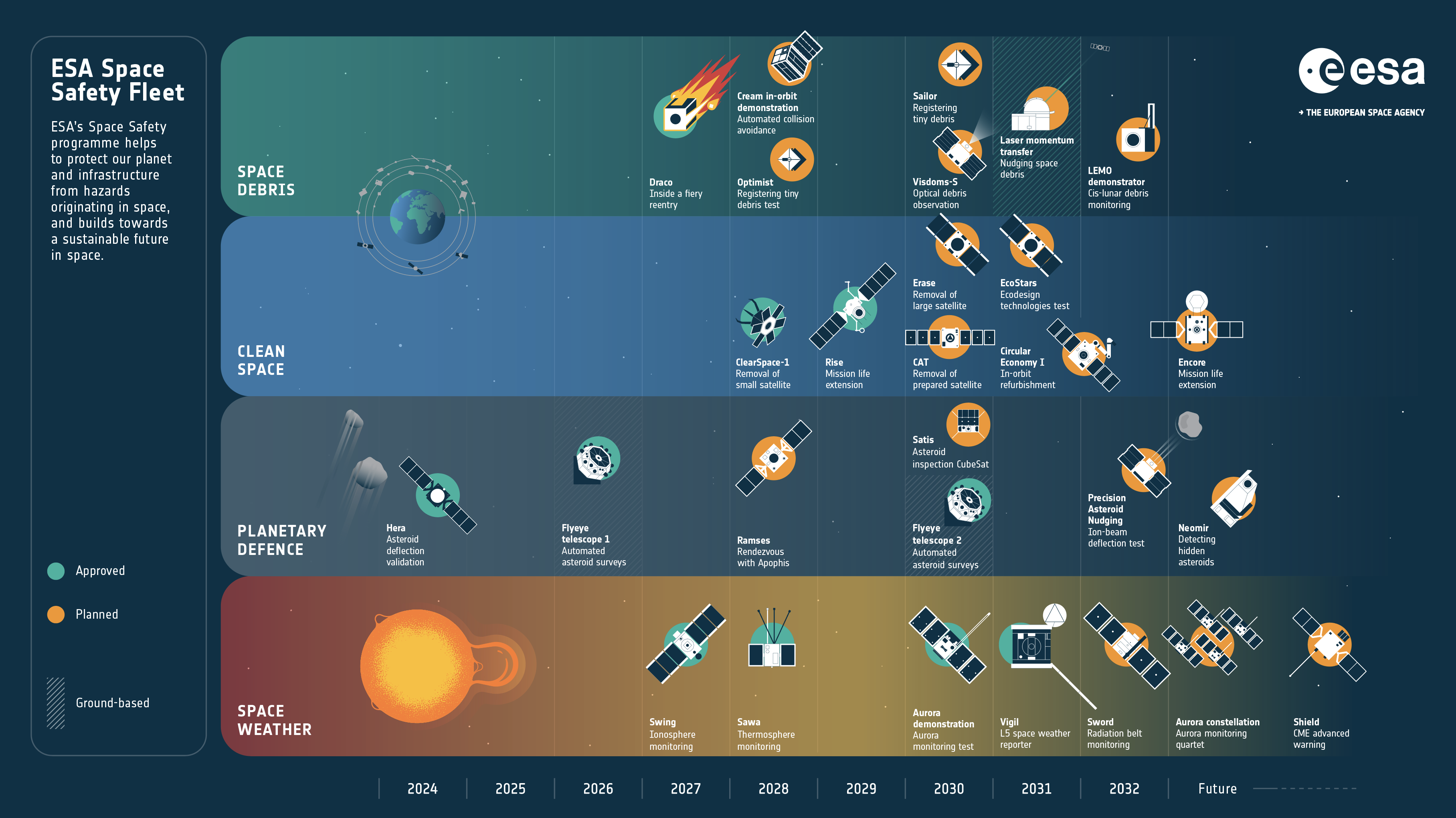
Proposed ESA Space Safety Fleet

Satis was also proposed as a mission to study the properties of the near-Earth asteroid Apophis before, during, and after its closest approach to Earth in April 2029. That would require launch in April 2028.

== See also ==
- List of European Space Agency programmes and missions
- Ramses
- Other European deep-space CubeSat missions:
  - HENON — launch in 2026, a space weather mission, ESA's first ever stand-alone deep space CubeSat
  - M-Argo — launch in 2027, a mission to an asteroid
  - LUMIO — launch in 2027, a mission to characterize the impacts of near-Earth meteoroids on the lunar far side
  - VMMO — launch in 2028, a mission to map the distribution of water ice and ilmenite on the Moon
