= M-Argo =

Space mission to an asteroid

- Mission type: Asteroid exploration & technology demonstration
- Operator: European Space Agency

Spacecraft properties
- Manufacturer: (Luxembourg) LSA, TICRA, GomSpace, KP Labs

Start of mission
- Launch date: NET 2027

M-Argo (Miniaturised Asteroid Remote Geophysical Observer) is a planned asteroid rendezvous mission by the European Space Agency (ESA) in the form of a 12U CubeSat. M-Argo will spend six months around its destination asteroid collecting data on a repeating two-week pattern, searching the asteroid for in-situ resources. The spacecraft will use ground-based navigation similar to that of Rosetta to determine its trajectory.

== Spacecraft ==
A Cubesat, M-Argo was largely made with cheap, standard parts that hundreds of other CubeSats use. The probe was designed by a consortium led by the Luxembourg Space Agency, alongside TICRA, GomSpace, and KP Labs.

M-Argo is 36.5 cm wide and 22 cm tall. It has its own propulsion system with twelve tiny gas jets to orientate and adjust its trajectory. Due to the crafts small size several different designs were iterated before the development team decided upon electric propulsion. M-Argo is also outfitted with a multispectral imager and laser altimeter as its primary payloads to map the asteroid. The multispectral imager was provided by the Polish firm KP Labs which also contributed AI algorithms it used on prior missions to process and compress data to save storage space. The probe will communicate with Earth using a specially designed X-band transponder and high-gain, flat-panel antenna. M-Argo will also use an experimental Deep-Space Optical Navigation system during its transit to its destination. Additional payloads include optical GNC and radio science and the solar array orientation mechanism (μSADA).

== Technology demonstration ==
Should the mission succeed, the ESA plans to approve a fleet of low-cost small spacecraft, perhaps 10 to 20 CubeSats at a time, to scout different asteroids on a surveying mission. Roger Walker, overseeing ESA's technology CubeSats, stated that M-Argo will "enable the cost of asteroid exploration to be reduced by an order of magnitude or more".

== Project history ==
=== Asteroid selection ===
By June 2021, M-Argo team screened over 700,000 possible destinations, finding 150 suitable targets before settling on a shortlist of five to be narrowed down to one shortly before launch due to changing orbital dynamics. The five selected asteroids differ in size, spin rate, and distance from the Earth. All five targets are small near-Earth asteroids less than 100 m in diameter. No asteroids of this type have been visited yet by probes.

=== Launch delays ===
Despite being largely constructed and ready for launch since 2021, M-Argo has continuously run into problems securing a launch vehicle. Initially, M-Argo was supposed to launch on a Vega-C in 2023, however, following the failure of Vega C flight VV22 the entire project, and its scheduled launches including the M-Argo were scrapped and redesigned. Afterwards, M-Argo was slated to be launched on-board an Ariane 6 in 2025, the back end of their launch window governed by the asteroid selection process. However, difficulties with the Ariane 6 flight VA262 delayed the launch. As of 2025, M-Argo was scheduled for launch in 2027, requiring the reevaluation of candidate target asteroids.

== See also ==
- List of European Space Agency programmes and missions
- Other European deep space CubeSat missions:
  - HENON — launch in 2026, a space weather mission, ESA's first ever stand-alone deep space CubeSat
  - LUMIO — launch in 2027, a CubeSat mission to characterize the impacts of near-Earth meteoroids on the lunar far side
  - VMMO — launch in 2028, a CubeSat Lunar orbiter mission to map the distribution of water ice and ilmenite on the Moon
  - Satis — launch in 2030, a mission to an asteroid
