= KP Labs =

Polish space company

- Type: Private Space
- Industry: Data processing
- Founded: 2016; 10 years ago
- Headquarters: Gliwice, Poland
- Website: kplabs.space

KP Labs is a Polish Private Space company based in Gliwice that specializes in data processing that was founded in 2016 by students of the Silesian University of Technology who wished to continue to peruse satellite development after graduation. KP Labs is subsidized by the Polish and European governments as part of the Silesian Aviation Cluster program which seeks to turn Silesia into an Aerospace hub. In 2024 KP Labs received the ESA's Innovation Award.

== Products ==
Current products include:

- Antelope: A computational unit for small satellites that can serve either as an on-board computer, or a data-processing unit.
- Oryx: A modular flight software tool for mission control of small satellites to create support drivers for otherwise unsupported hardware.
- Leopard: A CubeSat standard data processing unit designed for AI solutions.
- Herd: AI powered algorithms for image corrections and data analysis.
- Oasis: A single board CubeSat PC/104 ground support panel to run flight software before subsystems are physically present.
- Lion: A data processing unit for advance computations and larger satellites.

Discontinued products include:

- Zebra: a lightweight, hyperspectral imager.

== Missions ==
=== Intuition-1 ===
On 8 March 2019 it was announced that Scottish based Clyde Space was selected by KP Labs to deliver a 6U CubeSat for the mission Intuition-1 at the cost of $656,000. Part of the cost of the mission was subsidized by the Polish National Research and Development Center and in partnership with the European Space Agency. Intuition-1's payload is an advanced hyperspectral imager that tested new technologies for agriculture, mineral mapping and urban planning which would be processed by a "Leopard Data Processing Unit". Intiuition-1 was launched on board the Transporter-9 Falcon 9 launch on 11 November 2023 and as of April 2024 is operational.

=== ISS mission ===
On 14 May 2024, it was announced that KP Labs would be sending one of their "Leopard Data Processing Units" to the International Space Station as part of the Ingis mission to demonstrate how AI solutions can be implemented in space, namely, the ability to process hyperspectral images quickly to create a detailed map of a planetary body. The launch is scheduled for 2025 to coincide with the first polish astronaut to the ISS, Sławosz Uznański-Wiśniewski, aboard Axiom Mission 4.

=== M-Argo ===
On 8 June 2024, it was announced that KP Labs would be participating in the ESA's M-Argo mission to analyze physical properties of an asteroid. Specifically, KP Labs will be developing an artificial intelligence algorithm for the spacecraft based on Field-Programmable Gate Arrays.

=== Φsat-2 ===
On 2 July 2024, it was announced KP Labs would be participating in the ESA's Φsat-2 mission to demonstrate AI capabilities for earth observation containing a multi-spectral camera and onboard processor. KP Labs contributed cloud detection software while other firms provided street generation software, and maritime vessel detection capabilities. Φsat-2 was launched on 16 August 2024 on board the Falcon 9 Transporter-11 mission.

=== Orbital data center ===
On 8 August 2024, the ESA announced it was working with KP Labs and IBM to develop an orbital data center for data collected by small satellites, to save on-board space on transmission and storage capabilities. The system would see a satellite collect data in space, and then that satellite would transmit the data to earth. This will hopefully reduce lag and increase resolution capabilities allowing satellites to become smaller, and more precise.

=== FAST-EO ===
On 4 October 2024, it was announced KP Labs would be participating in the ESA's FAST-EO earth observation satellite, developing AI algorithms to support applications such as environmental monitoring and sustainable resource management while providing faster and more reliable insights for decision-making. Two areas KP Labs is focusing on is Methane leak detection and soil properties.
