= AMSAT-OSCAR 51 =

Derelict american amateur radio satellite

AMSAT-OSCAR 51 (AO-51)
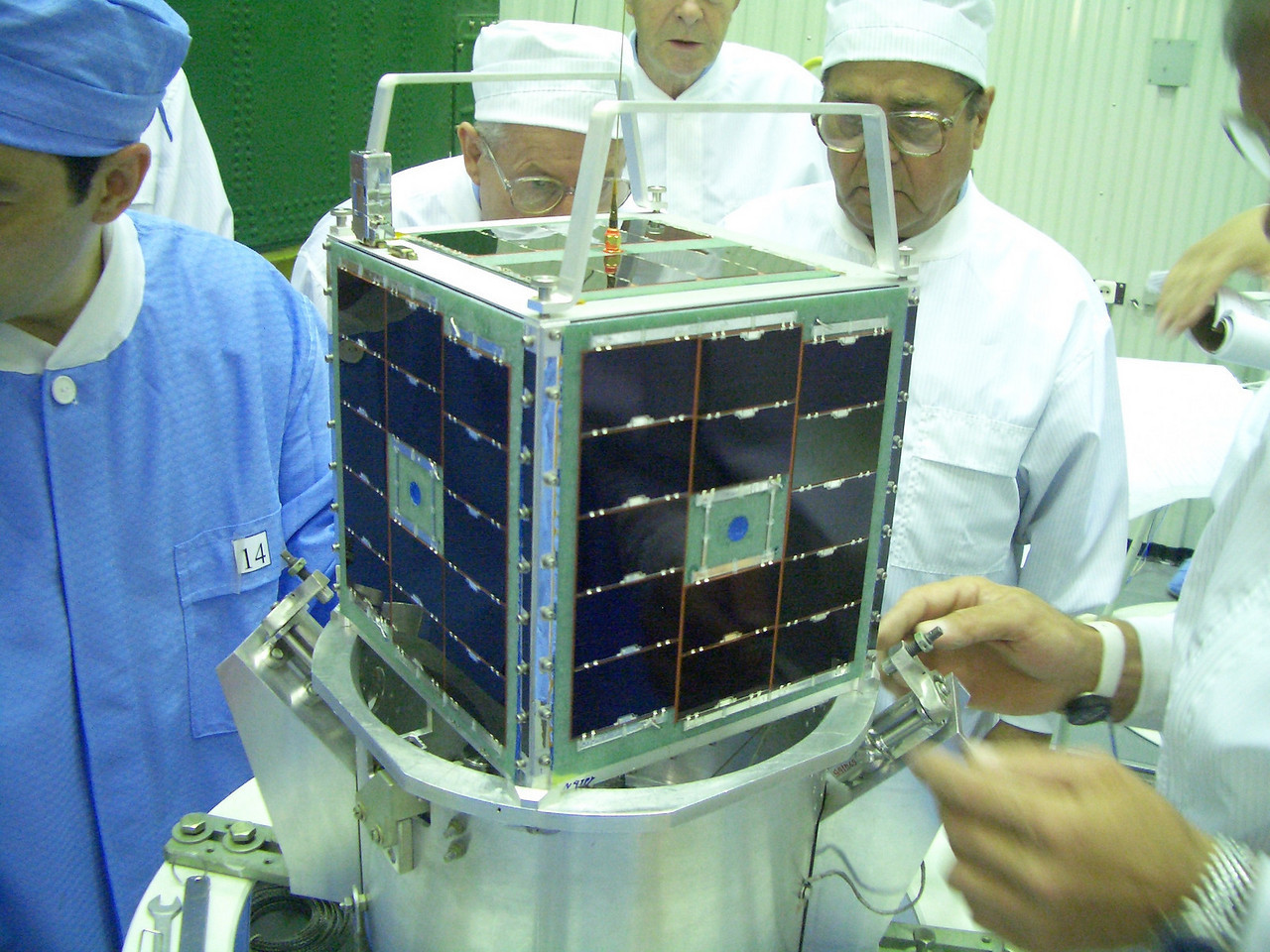
- Mission type: Amateur radio
- Operator: AMSAT-NA
- COSPAR ID: 2004-025K
- SATCAT no.: 28375
- Website: The Echo Project Page

Spacecraft properties
- Launch mass: 11.14 kilograms (24.6 lb)

Start of mission
- Launch date: 29 June 2004, 06:30:06 UTC
- Rocket: Dnepr
- Launch site: Baikonur 109/95
- Contractor: ISC Kosmotras

Orbital parameters
- Reference system: Geocentric
- Regime: Low Earth
- Semi-major axis: 7,132.45 kilometres (4,431.90 mi)
- Eccentricity: 0.0082657
- Perigee altitude: 702 kilometres (436 mi)
- Apogee altitude: 820 kilometres (510 mi)
- Inclination: 98.22 degrees
- Period: 99.91 minutes
- Epoch: 4 December 2013, 10:20:06 UTC

AMSAT-OSCAR 51 or AO-51 is the in-orbit name designation of a now defunct (following battery failure) LEO amateur radio satellite of the OSCAR series; formerly known as ECHO, built by AMSAT. It was launched on June 29, 2004 from Baikonur Cosmodrome, Kazakhstan on a Dnepr launch vehicle. It is in Sun synchronous low Earth orbit.

AO-51 contained an FM repeater with both 144 MHz (VHF) and 1.2 GHz (L band) uplinks and 435 MHz (UHF) and 2.4 GHz (S band) downlinks. It also contained a digital subsystem that transmitted telemetry on 70 cm and provided a complete PACSAT BBS that could be configured on both V band and S band uplinks. As well, there was a 10-meter PSK uplink.

AO-51 had four VHF receivers, two UHF transmitters, six modems, and 56 channels of telemetry. The two UHF transmitters were connected to four phased antennas, yielding right-hand circular polarization for the 435.300 downlink and left-hand circular polarization for the 435.150 downlink.

The AO-51 FM satellite was easily workable with an amateur radio VHF dual band hand-held radio, as long as you knew when the satellite's footprint was within reach. Transatlantic contacts had been made without much effort, as long as the satellite was approximately mid-Atlantic so that the edge of the satellites footprint was within reach on either continent.

As of May 2011 the satellite faced problems with the battery. By September, a work around for the battery issue was found, bringing the repeater back in use. On November 29, 2011, the AO-51 Command Team announced that AO-51 has ceased transmission and is not responding to commands.
