= Advanced Research Thermal Passive Exchange =

Advanced Research Thermal Passive Exchange (ARTE) is a project intended to create "Thermal Exchange", an experiment for the International Space Station (ISS). It is a heat pipe technology demonstrator in which the heat pipes contain low toxicity fluid. Thermal Exchange has been designed by Argotec in collaboration the Italian Space Agency (ASI). Polytechnic University of Turin participated in the project with the development of a prototype of the electronics and software. On April 4, 2016, the experiment was conducted nominally on board the International Space Station by the American astronaut Timothy Kopra.

== History ==
In 2012 Argotec started research in the field of passive heat transfer for the internal development of a device called a heat pipe. This technology is known in the scientific field, but at the moment in Europe there are very few producers and Italy is limited to the purchase of foreign products. Argotec developed a numerical model in order to design a device that can maximize the performance thanks to the optimal combination of external geometry (diameter and length of the tube) and internal geometry (grooves).

On board the International Space Station, heat transfer is mainly performed by active systems. Regarding heat removal, internal loops have been installed that collect heat generated by crew and equipment. They transport the heat to external loops, which then transfer the heat to surface (radiators) from which it is radiated towards deep space. The active systems are able to work across a range of operating powers because the application parameters can be changed during the operations by a controller. On the other hand, they have complexity that in space is often reflected in a greater involvement of resources (mass and time of the astronaut) and in a higher probability of malfunction.

The goal is then to design a competitive system in terms of performance that is also as simple as possible. Therefore, the ARTE project was born in order to realize a new payload: Thermal Exchange. The goal is to test heat pipes on board the ISS. The fluids selected are low toxicity fluids: this is the reason why these fluids can be used inside the Internal Space Station in which astronauts work. At the moment, some heat pipes are currently used on the ISS but they are installed externally because they contain ammonia. If this fluid were used for internal devices, in the event of a leak it would create a catastrophic hazard to the astronauts. Additionally, a leak could cause a permanent loss of one or more ISS modules.

On March 23, 2016, Thermal Exchange arrived on board the International Space Station delivered by the Cygnus (spacecraft) CRS OA–6, an Orbital/ATK vehicle. The experiment was conducted by the American astronaut Timothy Kopra on April 4, 2016. The same as ISSpresso, the Argotec team supported operations from their Mission Control Centre. Thermal Exchange was utilized again by the Italian astronaut Paolo Nespoli during his VITA mission started on July 28, 2017. On September 14, 2016 at 11.30, Italian hour, the Italian astronaut successfully conducted this experiment onboard the International Space Station.

== Objectives ==
During extensive research lasting 4 years, Argotec developed an internal numerical model able to identify the best geometry for heat pipe internal grooves provided the thermal operating range. The model has been validated both with a campaign of analysis and tests on Earth, and with the experiment conducted on board the Station. Thanks to the tests done on board the International Space Station, proprietary heat pipes have been qualified for use in Space.

A long term objective is the design of a system of heat pipes containing fluids of low toxicity more efficient than an active system that is currently used on the ISS.

It is not only space that benefits from research conducted on heat pipes: thanks to ARTE two patents were filed for technologies used on Earth and they have started new heat exchange projects, one of them is called "HEAT" project.

== Design and qualification ==
After the selection of the optimal geometry for the heat pipes, and the most appropriate fluids for the particular conditions on the Station, the engineers worked on the design of a payload able to independently carry out an experiment on board the ISS. The availability of resources in terms of power on the International Space Station was very important to the selection of the fluids. In fact, the payload was installed inside the Microgravite Science Glovebox (MSG), a glove box containing a cooling plate used to collect the heat carried by the heat pipes during the experiment.

As with every project for the ISS, the Thermal Exchange design has found applicable the requirements as defined by the NASA ISS program. The engineers conducted reviews with the ISS Payload Safety Review Panel to demonstrate the payload met the safety requirements with respect to the astronauts and the ISS systems. A sequence of tests has been performed to demonstrate the compatibility with the MSG at the Marshall Space Flight Center (MSFC) in Huntsville, Alabama. The data collected during the tests performed inside the MSG mockup represent part of the Baseline Data Collection (BDC) that the team created to define heat pipe performance.

The analysis of the data obtained on board increases the knowledge of the behaviour of heat pipes, and it has resulted in articles for scientific publication. Some publications have already been presented to the International Astronautical Congress (IAC) (2014 and 2015) and AIDAA (2015) conferences.
