= NOAA-2 =

American weather satellite (1972–1975)

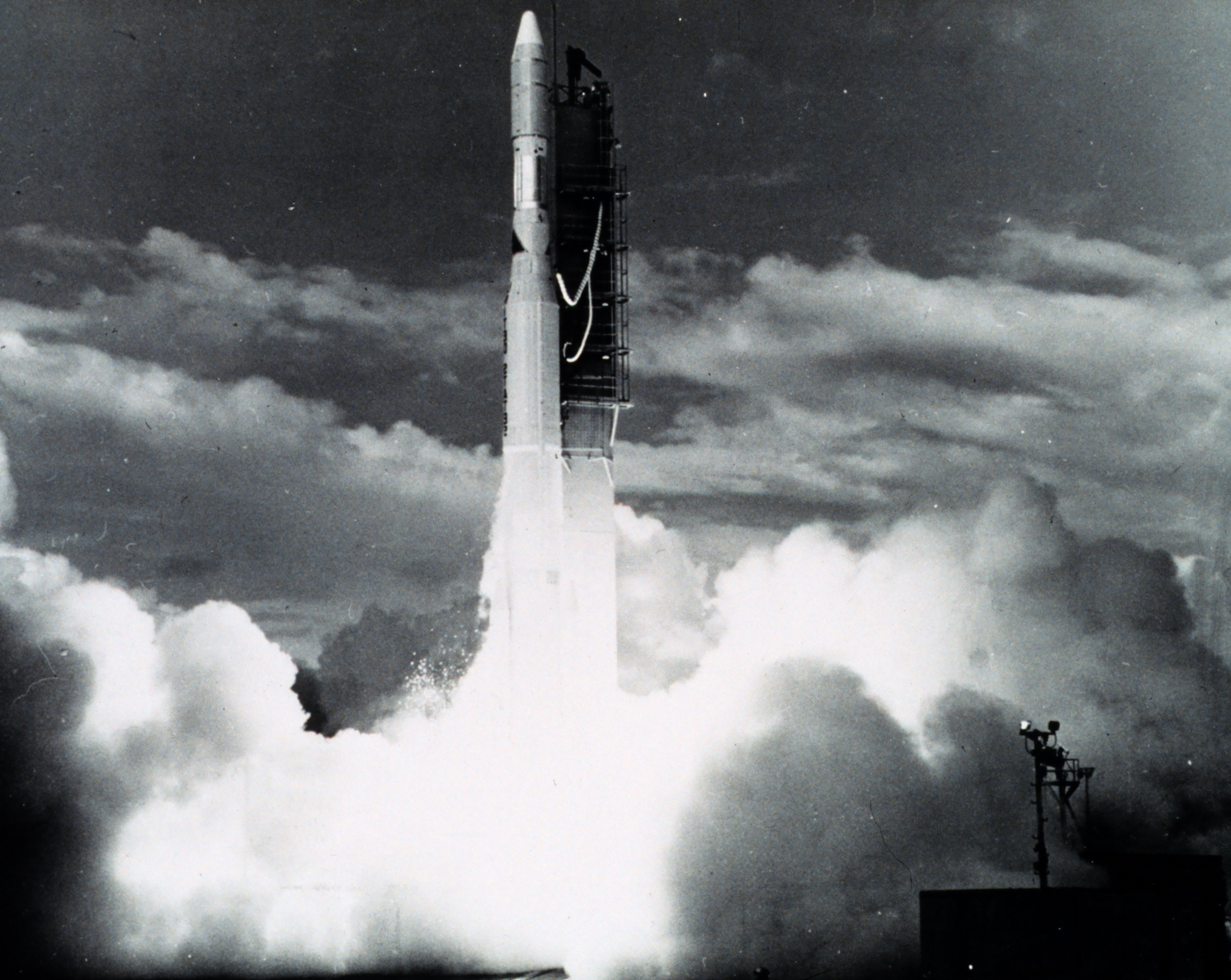
- NOAA 2 lifts off
- Mission type: Weather
- Operator: NOAA
- COSPAR ID: 1972-082A
- SATCAT no.: 6235
- Mission duration: 2 years and 3 months

Spacecraft properties
- Manufacturer: RCA Astrospace
- Launch mass: 306 kilograms (675 lb)

Start of mission
- Launch date: October 15, 1972, 17:17 UTC
- Rocket: Delta-300
- Launch site: Vandenberg SLC-2W

End of mission
- Disposal: Decommissioned
- Deactivated: January 30, 1975

Orbital parameters
- Reference system: Geocentric
- Regime: Low Earth; Sun-synchronous
- Eccentricity: 0.00032
- Perigee altitude: 1,448 kilometers (900 mi)
- Apogee altitude: 1,453 kilometers (903 mi)
- Inclination: 101.8°
- Period: 114.9 minutes
- Epoch: October 15, 1972

Instruments
- SPM, SR, VHRR, VTPR

NOAA-2, also known as ITOS-D, was a weather satellite operated by the National Oceanic and Atmospheric Administration (NOAA). It was part of a series of satellites called ITOS, or improved TIROS. NOAA-2 was launched on a Delta rocket on October 15, 1972. The launch carried one other satellite: AMSAT-OSCAR 6.

== Mission of NOAA-2 ==
NOAA 2 was the first in a series of reconfigured ITOS-M satellites launched with new meteorological sensors on board to expand the operational capability of the ITOS system. NOAA 2 was not equipped with conventional TV cameras. It was the first operational weather satellite to rely solely upon radiometric imaging to obtain cloud cover data. The primary objective of NOAA 2 was to provide global daytime and nighttime direct readout real-time cloud cover data on a daily basis. The Sun-synchronous spacecraft was also capable of supplying global atmospheric temperature soundings and very high resolution infrared cloudcover data for selected areas in either a direct readout or a tape-recorder mode. A secondary objective was to obtain global solar-proton flux data on a real-time daily basis.

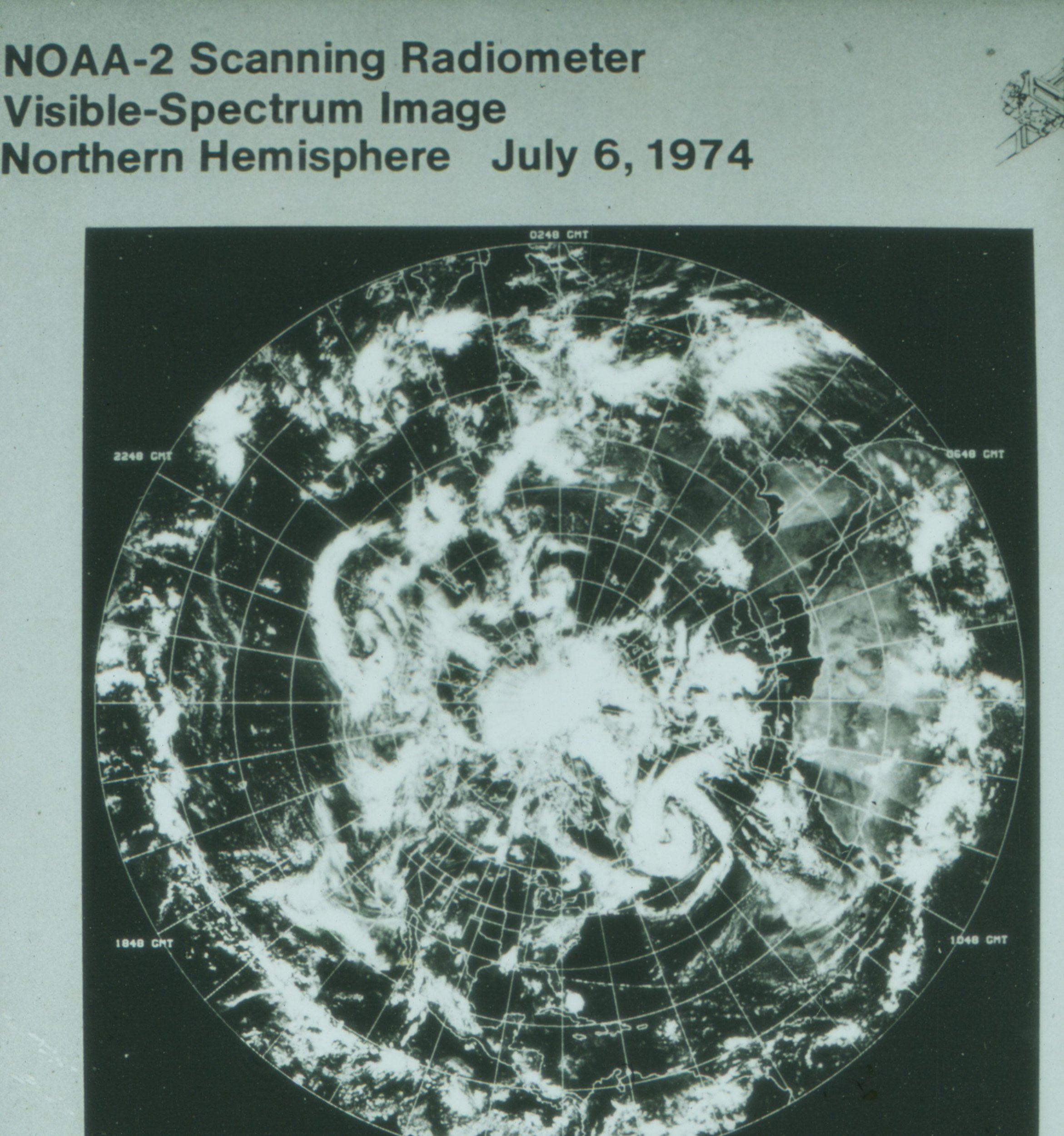
Composite image of Northern hemisphere derived from NOAA-2 scanning radiometer visible-spectrum image.

The primary sensors consisted of Very High Resolution Radiometer (VHRR), a Vertical Temperature Profile Radiometer (VTPR), and a Scanning Radiometer (SR). The VHRR, VTPR, and SR were mounted on the satellite baseplate with their optical axes directed vertically earthward.

The nearly cubical spacecraft measured 1 by 1 by 1.2 meters (3.3 ft × 3.3 ft × 3.9 ft). The satellite was equipped with three curved solar panels that were folded during launch and deployed after orbit was achieved. Each panel measured over 4.2 meters (14 ft) in length when unfolded and was covered with approximately 3,500 solar cells measuring 2 by 2 centimeters (0.79 in × 0.79 in). The NOAA 2 dynamics and attitude control system maintained desired spacecraft orientation through gyroscopic principles incorporated into the satellite design. Earth orientation of the satellite body was maintained by taking advantage of the precession induced from a momentum flywheel so that the satellite body precession rate of one revolution per orbit provided the desired Earth-looking attitude. Minor adjustments in attitude and orientation were made by means of magnetic coils and by varying the speed of the momentum flywheel.

The spacecraft operated satisfactorily until March 18, 1974, when VTPR failed. NOAA 2 was then placed in a marginal standby mode from March 19 to July 1, 1974. It was then used as the operational NOAA satellite until October 16, 1974, when it was again placed in a marginal standby mode. The spacecraft was deactivated on January 30, 1975.

== Current status ==
The satellite's ITOS imaging system has been heard transmitting a sync signal containing no image, on March 13, 2021, by Scott Tilley,

As of January 11, 2023 the satellite continues to broadcast this sync signal, and software made by Alexandre Rouma ON5RYZ/KE8SUI and Jacopo IU1QPT is available for decoding.
