= VIREON =

British Earth observation satellite constellation

- Manufacturer: (United Kingdom) AAC Clyde Space

Production
- Operational: 2
- Maiden launch: 30 March 2026, 11:02 UTC

Related spacecraft
- Launch vehicle: Falcon 9

VIREON is a British constellation of Earth observation satellites developed by the Glasgow-based company AAC Clyde Space with the support of the UK Space Agency (UKSA) and the European Space Agency (ESA). VIREON's goal is to provide near-real time images monitoring crops, forests, and water resources for increasing productivity and reducing environmental impact of agriculture, forestry, and land management. The first satellites of the constellation, two 16U CubeSats, were launched to low Earth orbit in March 2026 on the Transporter-16 mission of SpaceX's Falcon 9 rocket.

== See also ==
- List of European Space Agency programmes and missions
