= Douglas YOA-5 =

American seaplane bomber prototype

YOA-5
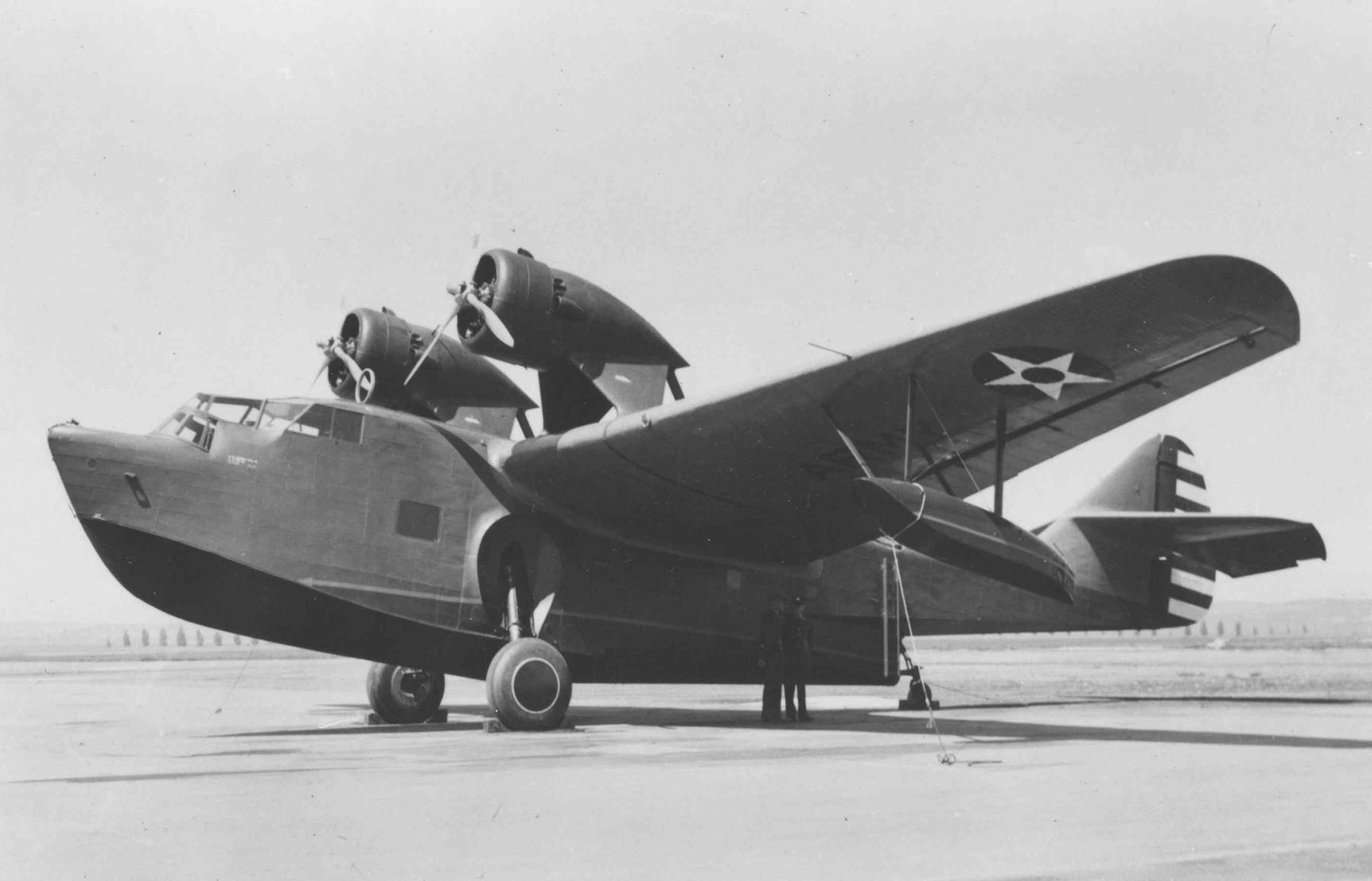

General information
- Type: Seaplane bomber
- Manufacturer: Douglas Aircraft Company
- Status: Prototype
- Primary user: United States Army Air Corps
- Number built: 1

History
- Introduction date: 1935
- First flight: 1935
- Retired: 1943
- Developed from: Douglas XP3D

The Douglas YOA-5 was an amphibious aircraft designed for the United States Army Air Corps, based on the Navy's Douglas XP3D. Although a prototype was built, it did not enter production.

== Design and development ==
In November 1932, the U.S. Army ordered the development of an amphibious reconnaissance aircraft/bomber, intended to act as navigation leaders and rescue aircraft for formations of conventional bombers. The resultant aircraft, which was ordered under the bomber designation YB-11, was designed in parallel with the similar but larger Douglas XP3D patrol flying boat for the United States Navy. It was a high-winged monoplane with two Wright R-1820 Cyclone radial engines mounted in individual nacelles above the wing, resembling an enlarged version of the Douglas Dolphin.

Prior to completion, it was redesignated firstly as an observation aircraft YO-44 and then as the YOA-5 'observation amphibian model 5'. It first flew during January 1935, and was delivered to the army during February that year. The concept for which it was designed proved impracticable, and no further production ensued, but the YOA-5 was used to set two world distance records for amphibians, being finally scrapped in December 1943.

== Operators ==
United States

- United States Army Air Corps

== Variants ==
YB-11
An amphibious reconnaissance bomber ordered in 1932 by the US Army Air Corps, powered by 2x Wright R-1820-13 Cyclone radial engines.
YO-44
The YB-11 redesignated in the Observation category before completion.
YOA-5
Another redesignation to the Observation Amphibian category. One built, given the aforementioned designations at various times in its life. The YOA-5 started life with Wright R-1820-13 Cyclone engines, was re-engined with 930 hp (690 kW) Wright YR-1820-45 Cyclone engines for experimental long-range flying, then re-engined again with 750 hp (560 kW) Wright R-1820-25 Cyclones.

== Specifications (YOA-5) ==
Data from McDonnell Douglas aircraft since 1920 : Volume I

General characteristics

- Crew: 4
- Length: 69 ft 6 in (21.18 m)
- Wingspan: 89 ft 9 in (27.36 m)
- Height: 21 ft 2 in (6.46 m)
- Gross weight: 20,000 lb (9,072 kg)
- Powerplant: 2 × Wright R-1820-25 Cyclone 9-cylinder air-cooled radial piston engines, 750 hp (560 kW) each

Performance

- Maximum speed: 169 mph (272 km/h, 147 kn) at sea level
- Power/mass: 0.075 hp/lb (0.123 kW/kg)

Armament

- Guns: 3× .30 in (7.62 mm) machine guns in open bow and fuselage positions

== See also ==
Related lists

- List of bomber aircraft
- List of military aircraft of the United States
- List of flying boats and floatplanes
