= Intuition-1 =

Imaging satellite

- Rendering of Intuition-1
- Mission type: Earth observation
- Operator: KP Labs

Spacecraft properties
- Spacecraft type: Satellite
- Manufacturer: AAC Clyde Space
- Dry mass: 12 kilograms (26 lb)

Start of mission
- Launch date: 11 November 2023, 18:57:00 UTC
- Rocket: Falcon 9
- Launch site: Vandenberg SCL-4
- Contractor: SpaceX Transporter-9

Orbital parameters
- Reference system: Geocentric
- Regime: LEO
- Apogee altitude: 535 kilometres (332 mi)
- Inclination: 97.5 degrees
- Period: 95 minutes
- Mission patch

Intuition-1 is a satellite developed by the Polish private space firm KP-Labs that was constructed by the Scottish firm AAC Clyde Space and launched into low Earth orbit by the SpaceX Transporter-9.

== Development ==
Development of the satellite was announced on April 23, 2019, when KP Labs announced that Clyde Space would manufacture the probe. The probe was scheduled to launch before December 2023, and KP Labs stated they had started developing software for the satellite as early as January 2018. The Intuition-1 is a standard 6U CubeSat that weighed 12 kg and measured 10 cm x 20 cm x 30 cm.

It was a technological demonstration satellite, to showcase the abilities of various KP Labs computational units and algorithms. Intuition-1 carried a Starbuck-Nano power unit, which has an operating temperature of -40 °C to 85 °C, and a maximum battery voltage of 8.2 V. The mission control consists of three units, including the KP Labs mission operations center and KP Labs ground station, both in Gliwice, as well as a number of other ground stations.

Intuition-1 cost $1,200,000, of which $650,000 was for the physical manufacturing of the satellite, with the rest going towards launch and operations. The camera was developed in accordance with ESA's FutureEO guidelines, and as such was partially funded by the ESA. The satellite is also part of the ESA's Project Genesis in conjunction with Φ-lab to contribute to new developments in soil health analysis.

== Mission ==
Intuition-1 was launched on 11 November 2023 at 18:57:00 UTC on board the SpaceX Transporter-9. Clyde Space also launched its own mission onboard Transporter-9, the EPICHyper-3 CubeSat, which was also a hyperspectral imaging platform.

The Intuition-1 carried just a single instrument, a hyperspectral imager that is able to take pictures of earth in VIS, near-infrared, and spectral band for a range of fields, including agriculture, forestry, environmental monitoring and climate studies. The camera has a swath width of 40 km and can achieve a spatial resolution of 25 m/pixel, with a spectral range of 470 nm - 900 nm. It can image in up to 192 channels. Each image produces 7 GB of data, however, thanks to the KP Labs-developed Leopard unit in the satellite running Oryx software, and Herd algorithms on their earth side mission control, the data gathered is processed on the satellite, and then sent to the surface, which can reduce the file size to just 70 MB. It was estimated that the satellite would send 100 GB of data to the surface per day, which would be reduced to just 300 MB. This marked a significant shift in the capability of Earth observation satellites to create a highly efficient and streamlined method of data transmissions.

On April 21, 2024, the Intuition-1 uploaded its first images of Earth, showcasing its operational efficiency. This achieved its technology demonstration goals, showcasing that the Leopard, in conjunction with Oryx, could process data on its own, which could be sent and further analyzed with the Herd software on the ground. KP Labs stated that the satellite and its abilities would revolutionize climate research and resource management, reducing the amount of time needed for satellite images, and allowing said images to reach remote areas. Data and images from Intuition-1 have been cited in research papers studying the satellite's ability to analyze agricultural and soil capabilities of a region.
