= Fox-1E =

American amateur radio satellite

- Names: RadFxSat-2; AO-109; AMSAT OSCAR 109
- Mission type: Communications
- Operator: AMSAT
- COSPAR ID: 2021-002C
- SATCAT no.: 47311

Spacecraft properties
- Manufacturer: Vanderbilt University; Radio Amateur Satellite Corporation
- Launch mass: 1.3 kg (2.9 lb)
- Dimensions: 10 cm × 10 cm × 10 cm (3.9 in × 3.9 in × 3.9 in)

Start of mission
- Launch date: 17 January 2021, 19:38:51 UTC
- Rocket: Boeing 747-744; LauncherOne R03
- Launch site: Mojave Air and Space Port
- Contractor: Virgin Orbit

End of mission
- Decay date: 24 April 2024, 00:00:00 UTC

Orbital parameters
- Reference system: Geocentric orbit
- Regime: Low Earth orbit
- Semi-major axis: 6,877.0 kilometres (4,273.2 mi)
- Perigee altitude: 478.1 km (297.1 mi)
- Apogee altitude: 535.9 km (333.0 mi)
- Inclination: 60.7°
- Period: 94.6 minutes

Fox-1E, AO-109 or AMSAT OSCAR 109 was an American amateur radio satellite. It was a 1U Cubesat built by the AMSAT-NA and carried a 30KHz linear transponder radio. Fox-1E was the fifth amateur radio satellite of the Fox series of AMSAT North America.

== Mission ==
The satellite was launched on 17 January 2021, with a LauncherOne rocket. This carrier rocket was launched by the "Cosmic Girl", a converted Boeing 747, from the Mojave Air and Space Port, California, United States, and to an altitude of approx. 35,000 ft (11,000 m). The flight was carried out on behalf of NASA's CubeSat Launch Initiative (CSLI) program and put 10 satellites into orbit as part of the Rideshare ELaNa 20 mission.

While in orbit the telemetry beacon was unable to be received, but the transponder remained partially in operation with reduced signal strength for the duration of the satellite's mission. Despite this, work on commissioning the telemetry beacon and checking the transponder continued with the aim of opening the satellite for general use; but the telemetry beacon never successfully recovered.

The satellite was opened for amateur use on 20 July 2021. It re-entered the Earth's atmosphere on 24 April 2024 at midnight.

Frequencies
435.750 MHz downlink	FM
145.860 MHz - 145.890 MHz uplink	LSB
435.760 MHz - 435.790 MHz downlink	USB

== See also ==
- OSCAR
