= AMSAT =

Amateur radio satellite organizations

Radio Amateur Satellite Corporation
- Abbreviation: AMSAT
- Formation: 1969
- Type: Nonprofit organization
- Purpose: Designing, building, and operating experimental satellites; promoting space education
- Headquarters: Washington, D.C.
- Location: United States
- Region served: North America
- President: Robert Bankston KE4AL
- Main organ: Board of Directors
- Website: http://www.amsat.org/

AMSAT is a name for various amateur radio satellite organizations worldwide. In particular, it often refers to the Radio Amateur Satellite Corporation, headquartered in Washington, D.C. AMSAT organizations design, build, arrange launches for, and then operate (command) satellites carrying amateur radio payloads, including the OSCAR series of satellites. Other informally affiliated national organizations exist, such as AMSAT Germany (AMSAT-DL) and AMSAT Japan (JAMSAT).

== History ==
AMSAT was founded in 1969 in Washington, D.C. to continue the efforts begun by Project OSCAR. Its first project was to coordinate the launch of OSCAR 5, constructed by students at the University of Melbourne. Some design modifications were needed and were made by AMSAT members, and the satellite was successfully launched on 30 January 1970, on a NASA Thor Delta launch vehicle.

AMSAT's next launch was AMSAT-OSCAR 6 (AO-6) on 15 October 1972. AO-6 was AMSAT's first long-life satellite, and was built with participants from Australia and West Germany. Command stations in Australia, Canada, United Kingdom, Hungary, Morocco, New Zealand, the United States and West Germany controlled the satellite, contributing greatly to its 4.5 years of service. Further launches continued to emphasize international cooperation, with AMSAT-OSCAR 7 (AO-7) launching with a new transponder developed and built by Karl Meinzer and AMSAT Germany (AMSAT-DL). AMSAT Japan (JAMSAT) contributed a transponder to AMSAT-OSCAR 8 (AO-8).

In order to launch its satellites, AMSAT has worked with space agencies and commercial launch contractors to develop new ways to take advantage of unused areas of launch vehicles. In return, AMSAT sometimes can negotiate a reduction or waiver of launch costs. One of the most significant is the Ariane Structure for Auxiliary Payloads (ASAP), developed and manufactured in partnership with the European Space Agency (ESA) in 1990 for use on its Ariane 4 launch vehicle. AMSAT was again able to take advantage of unused space with the launch of AMSAT-OSCAR 40 (AO-40), occupying unused space on an Ariane 5.

=== IPS ===
The IPS (Interpreter for Process Structures) programming language was specifically written for the RCA 1802 AMSAT Phase III satellite.

The IPS threaded code language, developed for AMSAT Phase III, is the first known use of a high-level language on board a spacecraft.

Another 16-bit IPS implementation was specifically developed to run on the ARM CPU in the IHU-2 on the AMSAT P3D.

A 32-bit IPS implementation has been developed for the AMSAT P3E satellite and the AMSAT P5A mission to Mars, which also have ARM CPUs. Emulators for both the classic 16-bit and the 32-bit IPS language and development environment are available for many other systems.

== AMSAT organizations worldwide ==
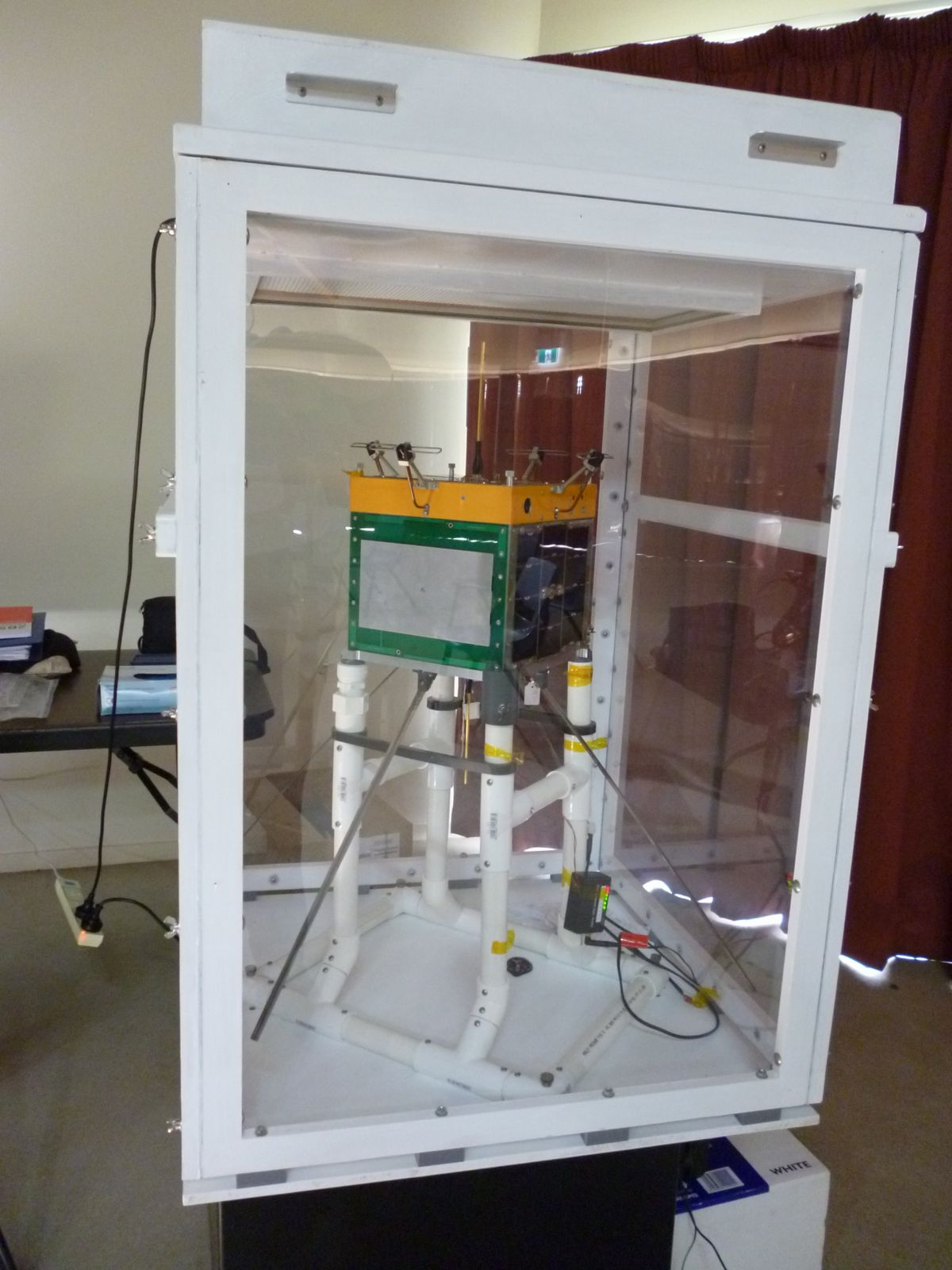
KiwiSAT amateur radio satellite, developed by AMSAT-NZ, in its "clean cabinet" being demonstrated at the 2013 Auckland Technology Convention

From its first launch, AMSAT projects have had international scope. By 2006, 21 countries had launched an amateur satellite. Many of these countries have their own AMSAT affiliate, some of which are noted below:

- AMSAT Germany (AMSAT-DL, AMSAT Deutschland) has built and managed projects of several amateur radio satellites, notably AO-40.
- AMSAT Japan (JAMSAT) has contributed to many satellites, in addition to launching its own satellites in cooperation with JAXA: the Fuji-OSCAR series.
- AMSAT India (AMSAT-IN) launched its first amateur satellite, VUSat-OSCAR 52 in 2005 aboard an Indian Space Research Organisation PSLV launch vehicle from Sriharikota, India.
- AMSAT United Kingdom (AMSAT-UK) built FUNcube AO-73 with AMSAT-NL, an Amateur CubeSat that was launched as part of a Russian Dnepr payload in November 2013.
- AMSAT Italia (AMSAT-I) has built the HAMVIDEO TV transmitter for International Space Station and IO-117 (Italy-Oscar 117) first amateur radio satellite in MEO orbit.
- AMSAT-CT is NGO for Education and Development is Portuguese VIP member of AMSAT-DL, funded by Aerospace Observatory in 1998
- AMSAT-CT develop the prototype of the satellite CAMOESat-1 at Oeiras Aerospace Observatory facilities
- AMSAT-NL Netherlands
- AMSAT Brazil
- AMSAT Philippines (AMSAT-PH), club call sign DX1O, Diwata-2 satellite is designated Philippines-OSCAR 101 (PO-101) and has the amateur call sign DW4TA.
- AMSAT Spain (AMSAT EA), designed and built the radio-amateur satellites GENESIS-L, GENESIS-N, EASAT-2 and HADES, all of them pocketQubes.
- AMSAT New Zealand (AMSAT-ZL) developed kiwiSAT, intended to be New Zealand's first satellite. It designed and built by New Zealand radio amateurs supported by Massey University (Auckland) and various corporate sponsors. The project began in 2003, but encountered many delays and setbacks, and was eventually dissolved in 2023.

== Phase system ==
The AMSAT Phase system describes an amateur satellite based upon its capabilities or mode of operation and roughly parallel the development of amateur satellites.

- Phase 1: No solar cells (battery-powered only), short-lived, technology test-bed. Must be able to orbit to be classified as a satellite.
- Phase 2: Long life using solar cells, communications capabilities, Low Earth Orbit.
- Phase 3: Long life, more powerful communications, telemetry and command systems. Highly elliptical orbit, usually a Molniya orbit; usually the initial orbit is a geostationary transfer orbit (GTO), onboard propulsion systems boosting it to its final orbit. Because of the highly elliptical orbit, the satellite remains over an area for long periods of time, allowing amateurs longer contacts through the satellite.
- Phase 4: Amateur satellite in geostationary orbit (GEO). Currently, the only amateur radio transponders in orbit are a secondary mission aboard Es'hail 2, designated as QO-100 by AMSAT on 26 February 2019.
- Phase 5: Spacecraft capable of lunar or planetary missions.

== Satellite names ==
Most amateur satellites do not receive their sequential OSCAR designation until after they are successfully in orbit, and then only at the request of the launching organization. Regardless, amateur satellites will have been named by the organization that constructed it, and that name is frequently prepended to its OSCAR designation, resulting a name such as CubeSat-OSCAR 57. In conversation, names are usually abbreviated as CO-57 or similar.

A unique amateur satellite was SuitSat, an obsolete Russian space suit with a transmitter in it, which was launched in 2006 from the International Space Station. In a twist of fate, "Oscar" was the name given to an obsolete space suit by its young owner in the 1958 novel Have Space Suit, Will Travel, by Robert A Heinlein. This book was originally published a year after the launch of the first artificial satellite, Sputnik 1.

== Satellites previously launched by AMSAT ==
The names of the satellites below are sorted in chronological order by launch date, ascending. The status column denotes the current operational status of the satellite. Green signifies that the satellite is currently operational, orange indicates that the satellite is partially operational or failing. Red indicates that the satellite is non operational and black indicates that the satellite has re-entered the Earth's atmosphere. The country listing denotes the country that constructed the satellite and not the launching country.

Name (a.k.a.)	Status	Launched	Country
AMSAT-OSCAR 6 (OSCAR 6, AO-6, AO-C, P2A)	Non-Operational	15 October 1972	United States
AMSAT-OSCAR 7 (OSCAR 7, AO-7, AO-B, P2B)	Semi-Operational	15 November 1974	United States
AMSAT-OSCAR 8 (OSCAR 8, AO-8, AO-D, P2D)	Non-Operational	5 March 1978	United States / Canada / Germany / Japan
AMSAT-OSCAR 10 (Phase 3B, AO-10, P3B)	Non-Operational	16 June 1983	United States / Germany
AMSAT-OSCAR 13 (Phase 3C, AO-13, P3C)	Decayed	15 June 1988	Germany
AMSAT-OSCAR 16 (Pacsat, AO-16, Microsat-1)	Semi-Operational	22 January 1990	United States
AMSAT-OSCAR 40 (AO-40, Phase 3D, P3D)	Non-Operational	16 November 2000	United States / Germany
AMSAT-OSCAR 51 (Echo, AO-51)	Non-Operational	28 June 2004	United States
AMSAT-OSCAR 85 (Fox-1A, AO-85)	Non-Operational	8 October 2015	United States
AMSAT-OSCAR 91 (Fox-1B, RadFxSat, AO-91)	Semi-Operational	18 November 2017	United States
AMSAT-OSCAR 92 (Fox-1D, AO-92)	Decayed	12 January 2018	United States
AMSAT-OSCAR 95 (Fox-1Cliff, AO-95)	Beacon Only	4 December 2018	United States
RadFxSat-2 (Fox-1E)	Decayed	17 January 2021	United States

== Current projects ==
AMSAT built a series of five 1U CubeSats to carry university experiments, including a camera, and mode U/V FM repeaters. The first two of these satellites, Fox-1A, and Fox-1B, were launched on 8 October 2015 and 18 November 2017 respectively and are currently operational and available for use. Fox-1D (AO-92) was launched on 12 January 2018 on the PSLV-C40 mission from Satish Dhawan Space Centre in Sriharikota, India. Fox-1Cliff was launched from Vandenberg Air Force Base aboard the SpaceX Falcon-9 SSO-A rocket on 3 December 2018. These four Fox satellites contain FM transponders with uplink on the 70 cm band and downlink on the 2 metre band.

AMSAT is currently developing the GOLF series of CubeSats with the first satellite in the series, GOLF-TEE, expected to launch in 2022. The GOLF series is designed to test technologies for future high Earth orbit (HEO) missions.

AMSAT also offers a communications platform for university CubeSats. The AMSAT Linear Transponder Module (LTM) includes a VHF/UHF telemetry beacon, command receiver, and linear transponder. The first LTM flew on HuskySat-OSCAR 107 in 2020. In July 2020, AMSAT and the University of Maine announced that an LTM would be provided for the University of Maine's MESAT1 CubeSat, Maine's first small satellite.

Additionally, AMSAT supports amateur radio on human spaceflight missions as a supporting partner of Amateur Radio on the International Space Station (ARISS). This partnership includes support for future missions on the Lunar Gateway.

AMSAT also supports STEM education and has developed a CubeSat Simulator as part of these efforts.

== Currently operating missions ==
AMSAT operates the AO-7 and AO-91 satellites, which are open for general amateur use. The U.S. Air Force FalconSAT-3 was turned over to AMSAT for amateur radio use in late September 2017. AO-95 was launched aboard SpaceX's Falcon-9 SSO-A mission on 4 December 2018 and was later determined to have poor to no RF reception capability, thus preventing commissioning and putting its FM transponder mission into indefinite suspension.
