= Fox-1D =

American amateur radio satellite

- Mission type: Communications
- Operator: AMSAT
- COSPAR ID: 2018-004AC
- SATCAT no.: 43137

Spacecraft properties
- Manufacturer: University of Iowa, Virginia Tech, Pennsylvania State-Erie, Radio Amateur Satellite Corporation
- Launch mass: 1.3 kilograms (2.9 lb)

Start of mission
- Launch date: 12 January 2018, 03:59 UTC
- Rocket: PSLV-XL C-40
- Launch site: Satish FLP

End of mission
- Decay date: 3 February 2024

Orbital parameters
- Reference system: Geocentric
- Regime: Low Earth
- Eccentricity: 0.0011184
- Perigee altitude: 490 kilometres (300 mi)
- Apogee altitude: 505 kilometres (314 mi)
- Inclination: 97.5331°
- RAAN: 238.3110°
- Argument of perigee: 77.5681°
- Mean motion: 282.6806°
- Epoch: 24 June 2018
- Revolution no.: 2484

Fox-1D, AO-92 or AMSAT OSCAR 92 was an American amateur radio satellite. Fox-1D was a 1U CubeSat developed and built by AMSAT-NA. Fox-1D carried a single-channel transponder for mode U/V in FM. Fox-1D had an L-band converter (the AMSAT L-band downshifter experiment), which allowed the FM transponder to be switched on an uplink in the 23 centimetres (9.1 in) band.

To enable it to launch under NASA's ELaNa (Educational Launch of Nanosatellites) program, the satellite continued to carry the following scientific and technical payloads:

- High Energy Radiation CubeSat (HERCI);
- Camera Experiment;
- MEMS GYRO Experiment.

The satellite had a single whip antenna for the 70 cm and 23 cm bands (uplink), as well as an antenna for the 2 m band (downlink).

== Mission ==
The satellite was launched on 12 January 2018 at 03:59 UTC with a PSLV XL rocket, along with the main payloads Cartosat-2F, NovaSAR-S, and 31 other small satellites from the Satish Dhawan Space Centre, India. At 05:17 UTC, the antennas were deployed over the North Pole and the satellite began to work. At 05:28 UTC the first telemetry was received and commissioning occurred over approximately two weeks.

By 2021, Fox-1D had experienced battery degradation and became rarely operational, occasionally being turned on and then defaulting into "Safe Mode" at the next eclipse. The satellite re-entered Earth's atmosphere on 3 February 2024.

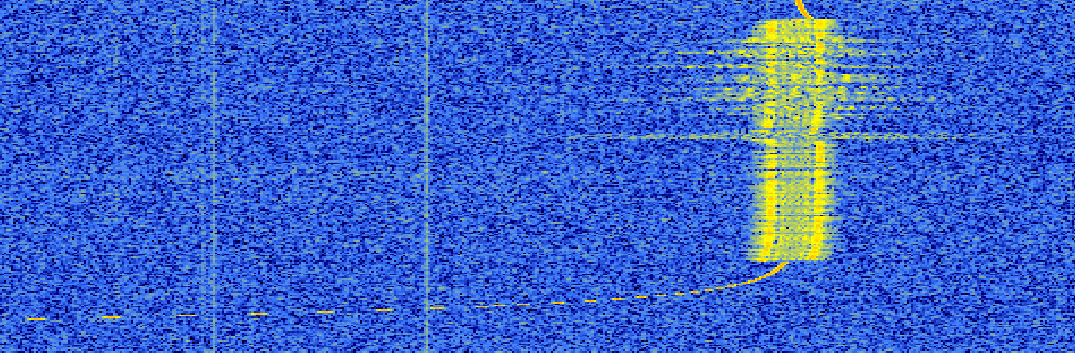
Fox-1D Transponder Mode Beacon.

Fox-1D Transponder Mode Beacon

AO-92 safe mode beacon.

Frequencies
145.880 MHz downlink	FM, data transmission DUV 200 bit/s and FSK 9600 bit/s, 400 - 800 mW
435.350 MHz uplink	FM CTCSS 67.0 Hz
1,267,350 MHz uplink	FM CTCSS 67.0 Hz

== See also ==
- OSCAR
