= AMSAT-OSCAR 16 =

Amateur radio satellite OSCAR 16

- Operator: AMSAT-NA
- COSPAR ID: 1990-005D
- SATCAT no.: 20439

Spacecraft properties
- Launch mass: 13.340 kilograms (29.41 lb)

Start of mission
- Launch date: 22 January 1990
- Rocket: Ariane 4 V-35
- Launch site: Kourou ELA-2
- Contractor: Arianespace

Orbital parameters
- Reference system: Geocentric
- Regime: Low Earth
- Perigee altitude: 783 kilometres (487 mi)
- Apogee altitude: 799 kilometres (496 mi)
- Inclination: 98.19 degrees
- Period: 100.58 minutes

AMSAT-OSCAR 16, also known as AO-16 and PACSAT, is the in-orbit name designation of an amateur radio satellite of the OSCAR series. It was built by AMSAT and was launched on 22 January 1990 from Kourou, French Guiana on an Ariane 4 launch vehicle. It is in Sun synchronous low Earth orbit.

== Discussion ==
Based on the success of UoSAT-OSCAR-11's Digital Communications Experiment, AMSAT-OSCAR-16 was designed to be a dedicated store-and-forward file server in space. Using 1200 bit per second Mode JD radio links, AMSAT-OSCAR-16 interacts with ground station terminal software to appear as a packet radio bulletin board system to the user. Anyone wishing to download files, personal mail from anywhere in the world, or news bulletins could request the information be "broadcast" to all under the footprint of the spacecraft, or directed specifically to that ground station. This broadcast protocol differs from terrestrial packet radio communications, but allows a greater number of ground stations access to the spacecraft's resources during the limited time of a pass.

A total of 10 megabytes of static RAM was used for message storage and a RAM disk. PACSAT communicated with ground stations through a single downlink channel and a total of four uplink channels. The multi-tasking operating system allows mailbox software and an AX.25 protocol driver to operate concurrently.

Only one 70-cm downlink transmitter is active at any one time. Due to performance degradation of the primary transmitter on 437.026 MHz, the secondary transmitter on 437.051 MHz is being used at the current time. All Microsats transmit using several watts of transmitter power making their signals easily received on the Earth below. AMSAT-OSCAR-16 accepts 1200 bit/s 3.5 kHz deviation Manchester encoded FSK on any of its uplink frequencies. It transmits using 1200 bit/s binary phase shift keying (BPSK), a very robust binary modulation scheme.

AO-16 uplinks are made with 2-Meter FM voice transmitters, while downlink reception requires a 70-cm SSB receiver or HF SSB receiver with a 70-cm converter. Several modem designs are available for Pacsat operation. These modems are also mode compatible with Fuji-OSCAR-20.

The uplink receivers are very sensitive. AX.25 connection to the spacecraft can be made with just a few watts of transmitter power and a modest antenna system. While testing a newly designed 1200 bit/s Pacsat modem, it was discovered that seven watts of transmitter power and an indoor antenna were all that was required to connect to oneself using AO-16 as a digipeater.

"Experimenter Days" were scheduled for PACSAT from time to time. During these periods, ground stations were encouraged to limit their uplink transmitter power to the minimum necessary to establish and maintain AX.25 connection with the digital transponder. Usually the transmitter power level was on the order of just a few watts.

Whole Orbit Data (WOD) collections was also performed by AO-16, and WOD files were available through the mailbox for all those who were interested in processing and analyzing spacecraft telemetry.
