= OSCAR 40 =

Amateur radio satellite of the OSCAR series

AMSAT-OSCAR-40, also known as AO-40 or simply OSCAR 40, was the on-orbit designation of an amateur radio satellite of the OSCAR series. Prior to launch, the spacecraft was known as Phase 3D or "P3D". AO-40 was built by AMSAT.

AO-40's project manager was Peter Guelzow of AMSAT-DL, the German AMSAT organization. Mr Guelzow holds amateur call sign DB2OS.

== History ==
=== Design, construction and launch ===
Following the failure of the Phase 3A launcher, design studies were undertaken and construction started for two successor satellites, that became AO-10 (Phase 3B) and AO-13 (Phase 3C) respectively.

After the launch of AO-13, design commenced for a Phase 4 satellite. This idea was later shelved, and design of Phase 3D (on-orbit name: AO-40) was undertaken under direction of the project team based in Germany, involving amateur radio payloads from many countries in Europe.

Assembly was done at AMSAT's Spacecraft Integration Facility in the 'Free Trade Zone Building' at the Orlando International Airport, Orlando, Florida from 1994 to 2000.

It was launched on 16 November 2000, on an Ariane 5 launch vehicle from Kourou, in French Guiana, and reported cost was US$4.5 Million.

=== Operational problems ===
On 13 December 2000 at 11:23 UTC, transmissions from AO-40 ceased during the exercising of its 400 newton motor. The Command Team were able to infer that there had been an explosion caused by pressure in the propellant pipes caused by malfunction of the control valves. A protective cap that was supposed to be removed from the motor before launch, was left in place. This error occurred because of a difference between the venting mechanism of the 400N motor used in AO-13 and the one in AO-40, complicated by a misunderstanding between the propulsion team and the engine manufacturer. When the motor was fired, pressure built up where it shouldn't, and destructive failure occurred. The loss of the motor caused AO-40 to be left in an equatorial orbit that the satellite was not designed for.

As a result of this incident several pieces of radio equipment no longer functioned or were not able to be commissioned. Following strenuous efforts by the Command Team, signals were restored on 25 December 2000 at 2145 UTC when Command Team member Ian Ashley (amateur radio call sign ZL1AOX) of New Zealand successfully sent a 'reset' signal to the satellite. Onboard cameras were used to establish the attitude of the satellite, and the magnetorquer system was used to spin-stabilize the satellite.

During June 2001, gas from the arcjet thruster was vented during apogee to raise perigee and stabilize the orbit of the satellite. Because of issues with the initial 400N burn, the apogee of the spacecraft was considerably higher than initially designed, but this was not a major issue. Subsequently, the communication packages and cameras were gradually re-activated.

=== Failure ===
On 25 January 2004, telemetry from the main battery was observed to go to an extremely low voltage by Stacey Mills (amateur radio call sign W4SM), a member of the Command Team. This caused the onboard Internal Housekeeping Unit (IHU) computer to cut power to the transponder payloads. Earlier in the same orbit the progressive drop in voltage caused the auxiliary battery to come online in parallel with the main battery. However the auxiliary battery was not being maintained in a charged state. Tying the two batteries in parallel did not result in an obvious change in voltage, but meant that the auxiliary battery could not be tested independently. Many attempts were made to disconnect the main battery, but insufficient voltage was available to drive the relays. It is possible that one day an open-circuit failure may occur in the main battery, in which case the spacecraft may come to life again via the auxiliary batteries. However, for reasons discussed below this is highly unlikely. The command team believes that the main battery failure was probably a consequence of damage done during the initial explosive event, and it is likely that similar damage was done to the auxiliary battery, making an eventual recovery of AO-40 unlikely. It is clear that the initial explosion blew open the end of the spacecraft to which the omni antennas were attached. This exposed the underlying batteries to major fluctuations in temperature and the explosion itself may have caused physical damage to the cells.

Following this final failure, the new keplerian elements have persistently shown an increase in orbital period corresponding to an increase in the semi-major axis of AO-40's orbit by approximately 2.7 km. Assuming AO-40 had a mass of 400 kg, this change required approximately 160,000 joules of energy directed along the velocity vector of the orbit. Since an explosion would be unlikely to focus its energy so precisely, it is likely that a considerably larger explosion occurred synchronous with the final battery failure. The source of this energy release is unknown, but it strongly suggests that recovery will not occur. (W4SM)

On 9 March 2004, Colin Hurst (amateur radio call sign VK5HI) of Australia, a member of the command team, heard a change in the level of radio noise at the expected beacon frequency during the period 0310 to 0320 UTC (orbit 1541).

All telemetry captured by the command team, and its network of helpers, is archived on the web at the AMSAT website.
