= ISSpresso =

Espresso coffee machine for use in space

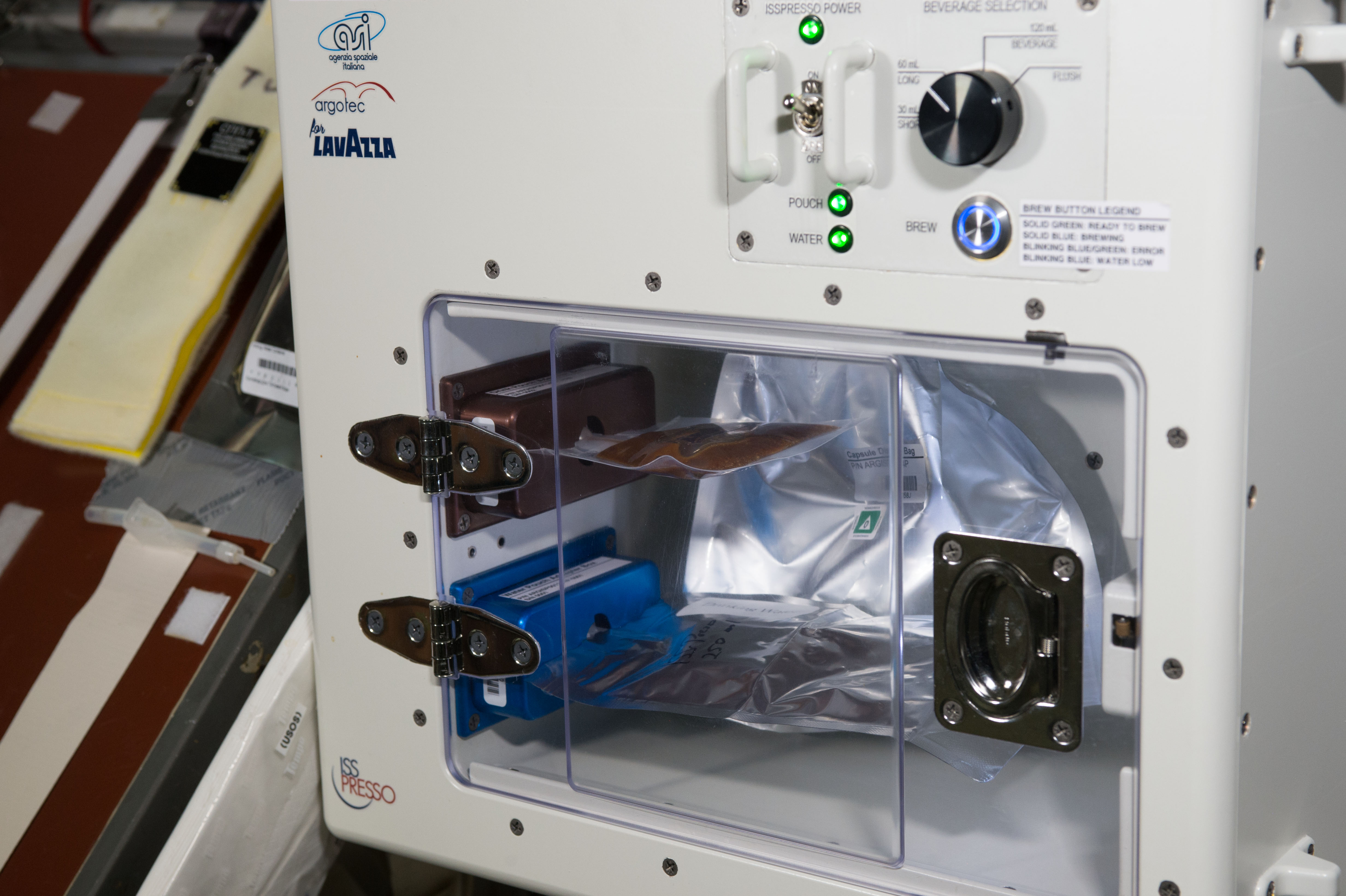
ISSpresso on the International Space Station

ISSpresso was the first espresso coffee machine designed for use in space, produced for the International Space Station by Argotec and Lavazza in a public-private partnership with the Italian Space Agency (ASI). ISSpresso was one of nine experiments selected by the Italian Space Agency for the Futura mission. It was installed on the space station between 2015 and 2017, when it was returned to Earth.

== History ==
In 2014, Argotec and Lavazza partnered to determine the feasibility of the project. Argotec then approached ASI, with Lavazza as a partner, and ASI agreed to sponsor the ISSpresso as an ASI payload on the ISS. NASA approval was then obtained. During the same year a feasibility study with the creation of some subsystems was conducted in order to validate the technological choices.

On 14 April 2015, the flight model of ISSpresso was sent to the International Space Station on SpaceX CRS-6 and on 3 May 2015, Samantha Cristoforetti drank the first espresso in micro-gravity conditions. On 30 September 2017, Paolo Nespoli used the espresso machine on board the ISS to celebrate International Coffee Day.

ISSpresso's mission came to an end on 14 December 2017, and the machine was returned to Earth by the SpaceX CRS-13 mission.

== Objectives ==
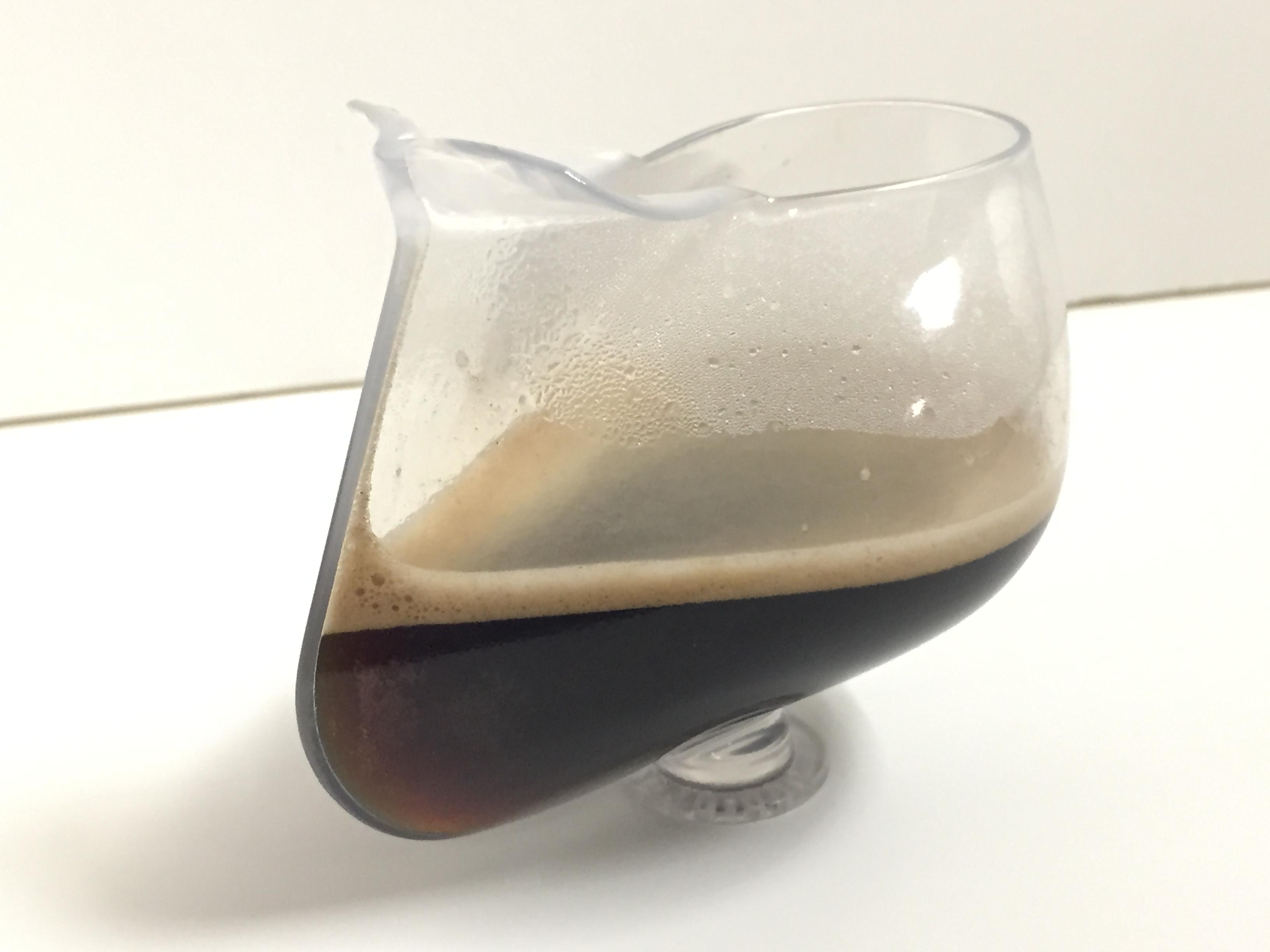
Use of the machine was done in conjunction with a zero-g espresso cup that uses capillary action to wick fluid into the mouth. This is an Earth-bound image taken in 2015 (gravity is acting on the fluid)

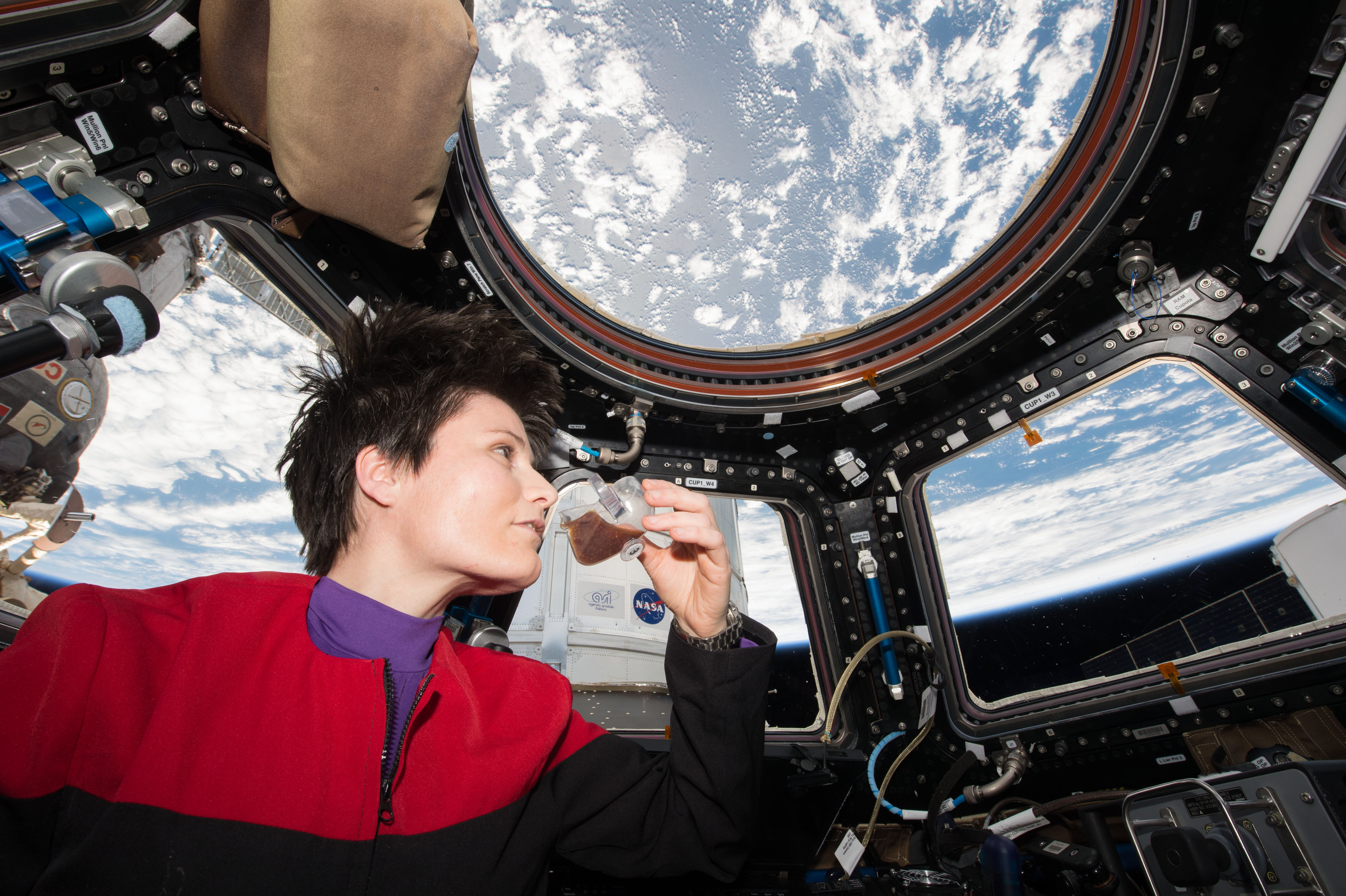
Astronaut Samantha Cristoforetti drinking espresso out of the cup on ISS, 2015

ISSpresso was designed to prepare espresso. Prior to this experiment, only soluble coffee was available in space. The astronauts could select from the following options: short black (30 ml), long black (60 ml), and hot drink (tea or broth, 120 ml). The machine also featured a flush cycle (60 ml) to clean the hydraulic circuit at the end of supply. The possibility of delivering hot water allowed for the rehydration of space food.

ISSpresso also offered the opportunity to study physical phenomena related to the fluid dynamics in microgravity of (pure and mixed) liquids at high pressure and temperature. The analysis of the foam formation with respect to that of the terrestrial coffee was of particular interest, starting from the design of the system in order to obtain it in microgravity.

A number of aspects of espresso brewing and consumption are related to or affected by gravity. One of the challenges was trying to produce the beverage in micro-gravity environment.

== Differences in respect to a commercial espresso maker ==
The first noticeable difference concerns the size and weight: 43 × 42 × 36 cm (17 × 16.5 × 14 in) and nearly 20 kg (44 lb). ISSpresso is heavier and more complex primarily because of the materials choice and the introduced redundancies to meet the safety requirements in all phases of the mission.

The ducts of the hydraulic circuit are made from steel, not plastic, to support operational loads up to 400 bars (5,800 psi). The brewer has been designed to minimize the amount of water remaining after the infusion. Furthermore, it hosts a set of microswitches that prevent the leakage of hot water under high pressure in case of unsuccessful or improper closure of the brewer itself.

The system to remove the used capsule in microgravity works via means of an aluminum piston that is activated by the astronaut, who drives the capsule into a disposal pouch. This is installed in the proximity of the brewer. The liquid taken from the water container is almost entirely used during the preparation. The resulting mixture is collected in a drink pouch. Contrary to the terrestrial machines, it is not necessary to have a collection tank considering that there is very limited waste water.

== Operation ==
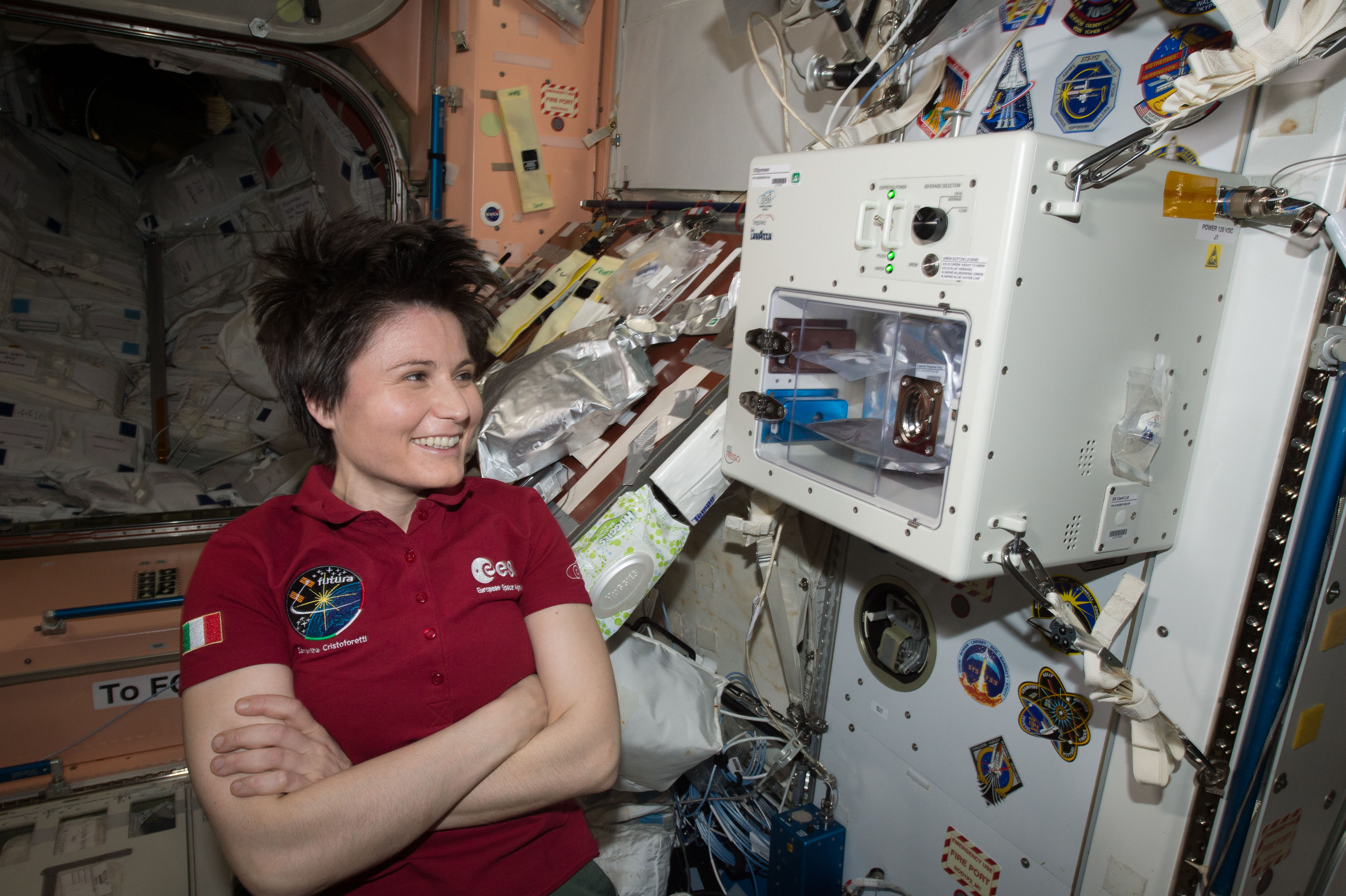
Cristoforetti next to ISSpresso machine, which can also produce other beverages including tea

The machine has conditions of use that are similar to the traditional ones, in order to facilitate the operations of the astronauts without requiring specific training. After verifying that the water container is installed properly, the astronaut inserts the coffee capsule into an opening on the top surface of the machine, then they close the small door and select the drink size. After that, they attach the drink pouch to the adapter and start the process of making coffee. The interfaces of the water container as well as of the drink pouch are the same used with the potable water dispenser installed on the space station, in order to facilitate the use of the system by the astronaut.

== Design and qualification ==
Through the safety process, NASA verified that the hardware would meet the necessary requirements and it has certified the system for the flight on the ISS. The external and internal structure of the machine was designed and tested to support the loads transmitted by the launch of the SpaceX CRS-6 spacecraft.

== Prototypes and models ==
ISSpresso was designed, built and tested by Argotec. Over 18 months, four models were constructed:

- The first model, called 2-D, was a prototype of the hydraulic and pneumatic systems. A pump and a commercial brewer were used.
- The second model, known as the Elegance Model, was developed to test the mechanical functions of the machine: many of the mechanical components correspond with those used for the flight unit.
- The third model, the so-called Ground Model, is the "Earth model". It is almost functionally identical to the flight model. A campaign of extensive testing to obtain the launch qualification was carried out on this model.
- The Protoflight model, i.e. flight model, is the final version that incorporates all the best technical solutions implemented in the previous models. The flight model was subjected to the processes of qualification and certified by NASA for use aboard the International Space Station.
