= AAC Clyde Space =

Private space company

- Logo
- Industry: Private spaceflight
- Predecessor: ÅAC Microtec; Clyde Space
- Founded: 2019; 7 years ago
- Headquarters: Uppsala, Sweden
- Areas served: Scotland, Sweden, the United States, the Netherlands, and South Africa
- Key people: Mats Thideman (CFO, Deputy CEO); Andrew Strain (CTO); Peter Anderson (CCO); Dino Lorenzini (CSO)
- Products: Satellites, Satellite components, Data
- Owner: Luis Gomes (CEO)
- Website: www.aac-clyde.space

AAC Clyde Space is a private space company that manufacturers satellites and satellite components for various contractors. The company operates out of Scotland, Sweden, the United States, the Netherlands, and South Africa, with partners in Japan and South Korea.

== History ==
AAC Clyde Space formed in 2019 as the result of a merger between Scottish firm Clyde Space operating out of Glasgow, and the Swedish firm ÅAC Microtec operating out of Uppsala. Both ÅAC Microtec and Clyde Space where formed in 2005. At the time of the merger, which was funded by investors from Nevis Capital and Coralinn, over 40% of all CubeSats had some components manufactured by Clyde Space. The firm's Uppsala office is the headquarters and main administrative office, while the Glasgow office is the company's main manufacturing hub.

AAC Clyde Space specializes in the construction and operation of small CubeSats, primarily constructing them for clients, and then operating them from their ground stations. In June 2020, AAC Clyde Space was awarded a £2.3 million grant from Scottish Enterprise to continue developing satellite technologies with the grant funding R&D, new equipment acquisitions and the creation of new jobs. In 2021, AAC Clyde Space created a subsidiary, AAC South Africa, based out of Cape Town as the company's center of competence for advanced radio communication. AAC South Africa received its first contract on February 28, 2024, to assemble, integrate, and test two satellites.

On January 27, 2023, AAC Clyde Space was awarded a kr2.6 million from Space Forge to provide space products for a demonstration spacecraft. This was the third order from Space Forge to AAC Clyde Space for this project.

On October 7, 2024, AAC Clyde Space was awarded kr5.8 million for a contract to deliver their Starbuck power systems to an undisclosed client.

On July 9, 2024, it was announced AAC Clyde Space would be partnering with the Scottish government on the Cyclops satellite constellation. The constellation will consist of four 16U CubeSats and will focus on analysis and automating and integrating image data from the Scottish Forestry’s Geospatial Information Systems and operations.

On 22 August, 2024, AAC Clyde Space was awarded kr7.1 million for the delivery of reaction wheels to an undisclosed US Blue Chip firm.

== Products ==
- Space Data as a Service (SDaaS): is application-ready data generated by AAC Clyde Space's satellite constellations for businesses to leverage high-quality Earth Observation and Maritime data without needing their own satellites.
- Components: AAC Clyde Space produces various hardware for satellites, including; Command and Handling processors, batteries, power control and distribution units, communications devices, solar arrays, structures, payloads, and Attitude Determination and Control Subsystems. These can range from standardized CubSat components which can be bought off the shelf, or custom made components for specialized satellites.
- Space Missions: AAC Clyde Space has a space delivery service that can construct a satellite, and operate it in orbit, for a fee. AAC Clyde Space promises a custom tailored experience, and claims that their service sets them apart from their competitors.

== Missions ==
=== Contracted ===
Satellites that AAC Clyde Space developed for clients include:

- UKube-1
- Kepler-1
- Kepler-2
- SeaHawk-1
- DaVinci
- IOD-1 GEMS
- NSLSat 1
- Kepler-3
- PICASSO-BEL
- MIR-SAT1
- NSLSat 2
- Amber-1
- ELO 3
- ELO 4
- Intuition-1
- Ymir-1
- Sedna 1
- Sedna 2

=== Independent ===
Satellites that AAC Clyde Space developed on their own behalf include:

- Kelpie 1
- EPICHyper-1
- EPICHyper-2
- Kelpie 2
- EPICHyper-3
- VIREON

=== In development ===
Satellites that AAC Clyde Space are currently developing include:

- Amber 2
- KSS-BOBCAT
- xSPANCION 1
- xSPANCION 2
- xSPANCION 3
- xSPANCION 4
- Ymir-2
- Io-1
- Amber 3
- OPS-SAT VOLT
- xSPANCION 5
- xSPANCION 6
- xSPANCION 7
- xSPANCION 8
- xSPANCION 9
- xSPANCION 10
- Cyclops

=== Cancelled ===
Satellites that AAC Clyde Space worked on that where ultimately cancelled include:

- CASPA
- GEMS-2
- OCEAN-SCAN 1
- OCEAN-SCAN 2
- OCEAN-SCAN 3
- OCEAN-SCAN 4
- OCEAN-SCAN 5
- OCEAN-SCAN 6
- Outernet 1U Demo 1
- Outernet 1U Demo 2
- Outernet 1U Demo 3
- Outernet 3U Demo 4 High Power
- SeaHawk-2

== Mergers and acquisitions ==
- Spacemetric AB: On July 4, 2024, it was announced the firm purchased the Swedish company Spacemetric AB for kr16 million. Spacemetric was a leading provider of geospatial data management systems for satellite and airborne imaging and video sensors, and the purchase came as AAC Clyde Space sought to expand its SDaaS businesses.
- Omnisys Instruments AB: On March 31, 2021, it was announced AAC Clyde Space had purchased the Swedish firm Omnisys, a manufacturer of measuring instruments for advanced space projects for kr75 million. Among Omnisys' customers are ESA, Airbus Defense & Space, the Swedish Space Agency, as well as a wide range of commercial companies in Europe and the USA. AAC Clyde Space inherited Omnisys' contracts with the ESA, including their components for the Arctic Weather Satellite.
- SpaceQuest: On October 15, 2020, AAC Clyde Space announced they had purchased the Fairfax, Virginia based firm SpaceQuest for $8.4 million. AAC Clyde Space stated that the merger was to expand their presence in the US, and to incorporate SpaceQuest's satellite fleet into their SDaaS business. SpaceQuest had been founded in 1994 and manufactured and operated small satellites for companies like Canadian Space Agency, NASA, and the U.S. Air Force and Navy.
- Hyperion Technologies BV On October 7, 2020 AAC Clyde Space announced they had purchased the Dutch firm Hyperion for $8.4 million. Hyperion, founded in 2013, produced small satellites and where noted for their high proficiency in orbital control systems.
