= AMSAT-OSCAR 6 =

1972 amateur radio satellite

- Mission type: Amateur Radio Satellite
- Operator: AMSAT
- COSPAR ID: 1972-082B
- SATCAT no.: 06236
- Mission duration: 4 years, 8 months and 5 days

Spacecraft properties
- Launch mass: 18.2 kilograms (40 lb)
- Dimensions: 16 cm × 30 cm × 44 cm (6.3 in × 11.8 in × 17.3 in)

Start of mission
- Launch date: 15 October 1972, 17:19:19 UTC
- Rocket: Delta 300 575/D-91
- Launch site: Vandenberg SLC-2W

End of mission
- Last contact: 21 June 1977

Orbital parameters
- Reference system: Geocentric
- Regime: Low Earth

AMSAT-OSCAR 6 (also called AMSAT-OSCAR C, AO-6, Amsat P2A or simply OSCAR 6) was an American amateur radio satellite.

It was launched on October 15, 1972, on a Delta 300 rocket from Vandenberg Space Force Base, together with the NOAA-2. It was the first satellite developed by Radio Amateur Satellite Corporation (AMSAT).

The first two-satellite communication was established in 1975 via OSCAR 4. The satellite was decommissioned on June 21, 1977 due to failure of their batteries.

== Specifications ==
- Power: Solar cells (3.5 watts)
- Launch mass: 40.2 pounds (18.2 kg)
- Apogee: 902.2 miles (1,452.0 km)
- Perigee: 896.6 miles (1,442.9 km)
- Orbital inclination: 101,7 degrees

== Frequencies ==
- Uplink (MHz): 145.900 - 146.000
- Downlink (MHz): 29.450 - 29.550
- Beacon (MHz): 435.100
- Mode: SSB CW
