= Douglas XP3D =

American prototype flying boat series

XP3D
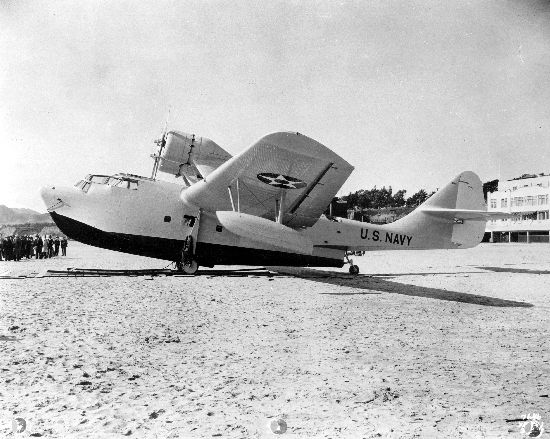
- The XP3D-1

General information
- Type: Flying boat
- National origin: United States of America
- Manufacturer: Douglas Aircraft Company
- Primary user: US Navy
- Number built: 1

History
- First flight: 6 February 1935

The Douglas XP3D was a prototype American patrol flying boat of the 1930s. A twin-engined high-winged monoplane, the P3D was produced by the Douglas Aircraft Company to equip the US Navy's Patrol squadrons, but despite meeting the Navy's requirements, the rival Consolidated PBY was preferred owing to a lower price.

== Development and design ==
In 1933, the United States Navy placed orders with both Douglas and Consolidated Aircraft for single prototypes of patrol flying boats, to replace the Consolidated P2Y and Martin P3M that equipped the Navy's patrol squadrons. Douglas's design, the P3D, was designed in parallel with the smaller YB-11 being developed for the United States Army Air Corps (which was eventually built as the YOA-5), and like the YB-11, was a twin-engined high-winged monoplane with its engines (the new Pratt & Whitney R-1830 Twin Wasp radial engine mounted in nacelles above and ahead of the wing. Unlike the YB-11, it was a pure flying boat rather than an amphibian, and was therefore fitted with retractable beaching gear to allow it to be moved to and from shore, rather than a full undercarriage allowing operation from land or sea.

The Douglas prototype, designated XP3D-1, first flew on 6 February 1935, and was delivered to NAS San Diego for testing in March 1935. Both the XP3D-1 and Consolidated's P3Y successfully passed the Navy's performance tests, demonstrated very similar performance, an order was placed for 60 P3Ys (re-designated PBY in May 1936) because the Consolidated aircraft was cheaper, costing $90,000 per aircraft compared with $110,000 for the Douglas aircraft.

Douglas re-designed the P3D to improve performance in order to win follow-on contracts, and rebuilt the XP3D-1, raising the wing by 27 inches (0.69 m) and mounting the engines on the leading edge of the wing. The fixed wing floats were replaced by retractable floats, and a nose turret was fitted. The rebuilt aircraft, designated XP3D-2 was re-delivered on 15 May 1935, but production orders again went to Consolidated, for the improved PBY-2.

== Operational history ==
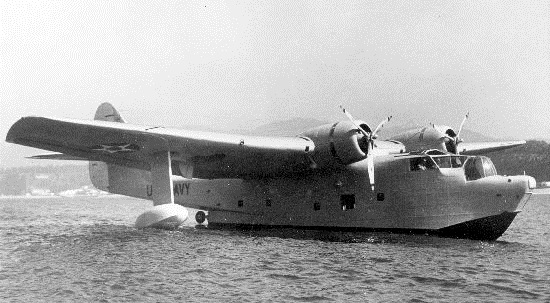
The aircraft after rebuilding as the XP3D-2

The XP3D-1 was briefly operated by Patrol Squadron 3 (VP-3) until it was returned to Douglas for re-building. The re-built XP3D-2 was used by VP-11F as an VIP aircraft until destroyed in a crash at Acapulco Bay, Mexico on 8 February 1937. The crash was survived by the embarked VIP, Rear Admiral Ernest King.

== Variants ==
XP3D-1
Prototype aircraft. Two 825 hp (615 kW) R-1830-58 engines.
XP3D-2
Rebuilt XP3D-1, with raised wing, engines moved to wing leading edge and retractable wing floats. Two 900 hp (671 kW) R-1830-64 engines.

== Operators ==
United States

- United States Navy

== Specifications (XP3D-2) ==
Data from McDonnell Douglas aircraft since 1920 : Volume I

General characteristics

- Crew: 5–7
- Length: 69 ft 7.5 in (21.222 m)
- Wingspan: 95 ft 0 in (28.96 m)
- Height: 22 ft 5.25 in (6.8390 m)
- Wing area: 1,295 sq ft (120.3 m^{2})
- Empty weight: 15,120 lb (6,858 kg)
- Gross weight: 22,909 lb (10,391 kg)
- Max takeoff weight: 27,946 lb (12,676 kg)
- Powerplant: 2 × Pratt & Whitney R-1830-64 Twin Wasp 14-cylinder air-cooled radial piston engines, 900 hp (670 kW) each
- Propellers: 3-bladed variable-pitch propellers

Performance

- Maximum speed: 183 mph (295 km/h, 159 kn) at 8,000 ft (2,400 m)
- Range: 2,050 mi (3,300 km, 1,780 nmi)3380
- Service ceiling: 18,900 ft (5,800 m)
- Time to altitude: 5,000 ft (1,500 m) in 6 minutes 6 seconds
- Wing loading: 17.7 lb/sq ft (86 kg/m^{2})
- Power/mass: 0.0565 hp/lb (0.0929 kW/kg)

Armament

- Guns: 3× 0.30 in (7.6 mm) Browning machine guns in nose turret and hull hatches
- Bombs: 3,000 lb (1,400 kg) of bombs

== See also ==
Related development

- Douglas YOA-5

Aircraft of comparable role, configuration, and era

- Consolidated PBY Catalina
