= HENON =

European spacecraft

- Mission type: Space weather probe
- Operator: ESA

Spacecraft properties
- Spacecraft type: 12U CubeSat
- Manufacturer: Argotec

Start of mission
- Launch date: March 2027 (planned)
- Rocket: Ariane 6

HENON (HEliospheric pioNeer for sOlar and interplanetary threats defeNce), is a planned space weather and technology demonstration mission by the European Space Agency (ESA) in the form of a 12U CubeSat. HENON will be ESA's first stand-alone deep space CubeSat and it intends to demonstrate an innovative long-duration low-thrust electric propulsion trajectory. Another goal of the mission is to demonstrate solar storm forecasting capabilities with 3–6 hours of advance warning before a storm reaches Earth, a considerable improvement compared to previous warning time. The launch of HENON is planned for March 2027.

== Background ==
HENON is funded through the Element 3 of the ESA's General Support Technology Programme (GSTP), which supports In Orbit Demonstration of new technologies. These missions combine technology demonstration with practical applications. The mission's prime contractor is Argotec in Italy and its Program Manager at Argotec is Davide Monferrini.

== Spacecraft ==
HENON's electric propulsion system is being developed by a UK consortium led by Mars Space. A miniature X-band space transponder and a solar array drive assembly are being developed by IMT in Italy. The spacecraft's power conditioning & distribution unit is being developed by Argotec. The xenon gas gridded ion engine is similar to the one used on the BepiColombo mission to Mercury, though miniaturised for CubeSat applications.

== Instruments ==
The mission will demonstrate new miniaturised scientific instruments for space weather observations including a radiation particle telescope, magnetometer, and a Faraday Cup for measuring the solar wind properties:

- MAGIC Magnetometer mounted on a 1-meter long boom
  - was already tested on another ESA CubeSat, RadCube, launched in 2021
  - will measure the magnetic field in deep space to enhance space weather predictions
  - provided by Imperial College London, UK
  - these sensors were also planned to be used on the Lunar Gateway
- REPE Payload
  - will measure directional proton and electron fluxes
  - provided by ASRO and Space Research Laboratory, Turku University, Finland
- Faraday Cup Analyser
  - will take solar wind measurements including ion vector velocity and ion flux
  - provided by Charles University in Czechia

== Trajectory ==
HENON will be launched together with another larger spacecraft (ESA's PLATO) to the Sun-Earth Lagrange point 2. Then, it will use its own electric propulsion system to fly to a Distant Retrograde Orbit (DRO) of the Sun-Earth system, an orbit similar to but more elliptical than that of the Earth. In this orbit, it will be passing upstream of Earth on the sunward side and get 10x nearer the Sun compared to a spacecraft in Lagrange point 1. This orbit was invented by French astronomer Michel Hénon in 1969. HENON, named after him, will be the first ever spacecraft to use this type of orbit. The spacecraft will be 12 million km from Earth at the orbit's closest point and 24 million km away at the farthest. HENON is expected to reach DRO in about 1 year using exclusively its on-board electric propulsion.

== History ==
In March 2025, HENON entered into Phase C2D of its development. Many technical risks identified in its Preliminary Design Review have been resolved and the mission was cleared to move towards the Critical Design Review planned for August 2025. In April 2025, ESTEC was testing the gridded ion engine thruster for HENON. In late 2025, the spacecraft passed its Critical Design Review. In July 2026, ESA awarded a contract to Arianespace to launch HENON as a secondary payload on the Ariane 6 flight carrying the PLATO telescope in March 2027.

== See also ==
- List of heliophysics missions
- List of European Space Agency programmes and missions
