= Argotec =

Italian aerospace engineering company

Argotec S.r.l.
- Type: Private limited liability company
- Industry: Aerospace
- Founded: 2008; 18 years ago
- Headquarters: Turin, Italy
- Website: https://www.argotecgroup.com/

Argotec is an Italian aerospace engineering company founded in 2008 in Turin, Italy by David Avino. The company operates offices in Maryland and Florida (United States), as well as at the European Astronaut Centre (EAC) in Cologne, Germany. Argotec specialises in the development and production of small satellites (up to 200 kg) and engineering solutions designed to improve the comfort of astronauts in orbit.

== History ==
Argotec initially focused on providing services for space missions, particularly through the development of specialised food systems for astronauts aboard the International Space Station (ISS).

The company subsequently shifted its core activities toward the design and production of microsatellites. A notable milestone was the development of ISSpresso, the first espresso coffee machine designed for use in microgravity. Created in collaboration with Lavazza, the machine was delivered to the ISS in 2015.

Following this project, Argotec consolidated its activities around two main areas: small satellite manufacturing and the development of comfort solutions for astronauts, explorers, and prospective space tourists.

In the field of small satellites, Argotec has contributed to two NASA missions involving microsatellites.

The first mission, in terms of completion, was the Double Asteroid Redirection Test (DART), which took place on 27 September 2022. Argotec developed LICIACube, a microsatellite deployed during the mission to capture images of the impact between the DART spacecraft and the asteroid Dimorphos.

LICIACube is based on the HAWK platform and measures approximately 30 × 20 × 10 cm. It is equipped with two optical instruments capable of acquiring images and processing data onboard, enabling fully autonomous navigation. During the impact phase, operations were managed through artificial intelligence, with control later re-established by Argotec engineers from the company’s control room in Turin.

Argotec also developed ArgoMoon, which flew aboard NASA’s Artemis 1 mission. ArgoMoon was the only European satellite among the ten CubeSats selected for the mission. It captured images of both Earth and the Moon and was based on a platform similar to that of LICIACube.

In 2022, Argotec became the only company to have two small satellites simultaneously operating in deep space. The LICIACube mission was subsequently awarded the 2023 Mission of the Year by the American Institute for Aeronautics and Astronautics (AIAA).

In December 2022, Argotec signed a contract to manufacture the first batch of ten satellites for IRIDE, an Earth observation constellation promoted by the Italian government and funded through the National Recovery and Resilience Plan (PNRR).

The company is also involved in the development of ANDROMEDA, a planned lunar satellite constellation consisting of 24 spacecraft intended to provide communication services across the lunar surface and between Earth and the Moon, with potential future applications for Mars missions.

Additional projects include Lumio, focused on monitoring meteoroid impacts on the Moon, and HENON, a satellite designed to forecast solar storms from a Distant retrograde orbit.

== Research and development ==
Argotec has conducted extensive research in the field of heat pipe technology, leading to the development of proprietary numerical and optimisation models. These tools enable the design of highly efficient heat pipes through the optimisation of both macroscopic parameters (such as tube diameter and length) and microscopic characteristics (such as internal groove structure).

Particular emphasis has been placed on the selection of low-toxicity working fluids, allowing potential applications in inhabited space environments. These technologies may also be adapted for terrestrial use, improving the efficiency of domestic heating systems by enhancing heat transfer from sources such as boilers or solar concentrators.

The use of phase-change mechanisms enables more efficient heat transport compared to conventional systems, potentially resulting in energy savings under comparable operating conditions. Notable projects arising from this research include RAH (Renewable Passive Heat System), HEAT (Heat Exchanging Passive Technology), ARTE (Advanced Research for Passive Thermal Exchange), and INWIP (Innovative Wickless Heat Pipe Systems for Ground and Space Applications).

Argotec’s expertise also extends to the design of electronic power systems, onboard computers, and flight software, as well as the selection and integration of commercial off-the-shelf (COTS) components. The company adapts its solutions to meet mission-specific requirements.

In addition, Argotec is familiar with European Space Agency (ESA) and NASA standards (ECSS and SSP), as well as safety and integration procedures required for payloads operating aboard the ISS.

== Projects ==
ISSpresso is a microgravity-compatible espresso machine developed by Argotec in partnership with Lavazza and the Italian Space Agency. Designed to study fluid dynamics under high temperature and pressure in microgravity conditions, it was first used on 3 May 2015 by astronaut Samantha Cristoforetti aboard the ISS. The system has also been used in subsequent missions, including those involving astronaut Paolo Nespoli.

The ARTE experiment was developed in 2014 to investigate the behaviour of heat pipes containing low-toxicity fluids under microgravity conditions. Coordinated by the Italian Space Agency, the experiment was conducted aboard the ISS on 4 April 2016 by astronaut Timothy Kopra and later reused in subsequent missions.

In September 2015, NASA announced an opportunity for 13 CubeSats (6U standard) to fly on the Artemis 1 mission. Among the selected projects was ArgoMoon, developed by Argotec in collaboration with the Italian Space Agency. It was the only European satellite chosen for the mission. ArgoMoon was designed to document launch vehicle operations and test nanotechnologies in translunar space, contributing to future deep-space exploration and cost-effective Earth observation.
