= Ariane Next =

Orbital recoverable launch vehicle of the European company ArianeGroup

- Function: Partially reusable launch vehicle to low Earth orbit
- Manufacturer: ArianeGroup
- Country of origin: European multi-national

Size
- Stages: 2

Associated rockets
- Family: Ariane
- Based on: Themis
- Comparable: Falcon 9

Launch history
- Status: Under development
- Launch sites: Guiana Space Centre

First stage
- Powered by: 7 to 9 × Prometheus
- Propellant: LOX / CH_{4}

Second stage
- Powered by: 1 × Prometheus
- Propellant: LOX / CH_{4}

Ariane Next is a future European partially reusable launch vehicle planned to succeed Ariane 6, with an entry into service in the 2030s. The objective of the new launcher is to halve the launch costs compared with Ariane 6. Principal technologies for Ariane Next are being developed under the EU-funded Project SALTO's VTVL demonstrator Themis programme, the joint CNES-DLR-JAXA VTVL demonstrator CALLISTO project, and the ESA-funded Prometheus methane-fueled rocket engine development project. ArianeGroup plans to use Prometheus first on the smaller, partially reusable Maia rocket, developed by its subsidiary MaiaSpace.

== History ==
The expendable launcher Ariane 6, whose development officially began in 2014, succeeded the Ariane 5 rocket in 2024. CNES and ArianeGroup officials started publicly discussing the future reusable launch vehicle under the name "Ariane Next" in 2017. First results of system studies for the new launch vehicle were published in 2019 and 2020, stating the priority objective as halving the cost of launching, as compared to Ariane 6, with simplified and more flexible launch methods.

In 2021, ArianeGroup was selected by the European Commission to head two projects: one to develop a new reusable launch vehicle and the other to develop a new liquid propellant rocket engine for the vehicle. The two projects were named SALTO (reuSable strAtegic space Launcher Technologies & Operations) and ENLIGHTEN (European iNitiative for Low cost, Innovative & Green High Thrust Engine), respectively. Funding for the projects was provided by the Horizon Europe programme designed to encourage and accelerate innovation in Europe. The ENLIGHTEN project, and its 2024 continuation ENLIGHTEN-ED (Engine Demonstration), follow up on the success of the Prometheus development project.

In May 2022, the French Economy Minister Bruno Le Maire said SALTO and ENLIGHTEN would be operational by 2026, and ArianeGroup stated that the target date was achievable. The Prometheus engine's first hot fire testing occurred in 2023. As of October 2025, the SALTO project intended to carry out an initial flight test of a single rocket stage in 2026, using the Themis T1H prototype first stage to validate the landing phase of the design.

== Test vehicles ==
Reusable Rocket Demonstrators (Europe and Japan in the 2020s)

- FROG-T, developed by CNES, was a small turbojet-powered demonstrator for testing the vertical landing of a rocket stage. It made several flights in 2019.
- FROG-H, under development by CNES, is a larger demonstrator powered by a monopropellant rocket engine provided by the Łukasiewicz Institute of Aviation in Poland. Its first flight is expected in 2026.
- Callisto, developed by CNES, DLR, and JAXA, aims to improve the techniques required to produce a reusable launcher (return to Earth and reconditioning) and to estimate the operational cost of such a launcher. Its first flight is scheduled for 2027.
- Themis, developed by the EU-funded project SALTO, is a reusable first stage demonstrator with one to three Prometheus rocket motors and is expected to fly in 2026.

== Project SALTO ==
Funded by the EU under the Horizon Europe programme, project SALTO aims to raise the maturity level of the first European reusable rocket technology, significantly reduce launch costs, ensure improvements in the environmental footprint and strengthen Europe's competitiveness in strategic space missions. The main highlight of the project will be a series of VTVL hop tests at the Esrange Space Center in Sweden in 2026 with Themis, a reusable rocket demonstrator developed by the European Space Agency (ESA) with ArianeGroup as prime contractor. The next-generation Prometheus rocket engine will use liquid methane at −162 °C as a fuel instead of hydrogen. The engine is expected to play a key role in future missions, including launching commercial satellites.

== Description ==
The architecture proposed for Ariane Next uses a design based on SpaceX's Falcon 9: a reusable first stage which, after having separated from the second stage, returns to land vertically on Earth. The first stage will use several liquid-propellant rocket engines: the predecessor for these is the Prometheus rocket engine under development by the ESA, which burns a mixture of methane and liquid oxygen. Methane is somewhat less efficient than the hydrogen used by the Vulcain engine of Ariane 6 but it can be stored at higher temperatures, −160 °C (113 K; −256 °F) compared to −253 °C (20 K; −423 °F) for hydrogen, which makes it possible to lighten and simplify the tanks and the supply circuits. The density of liquid methane is higher than hydrogen, which allows a mass reduction in the tank structure. The launcher is planned to use seven or nine of such engines for the first stage and a single engine for the second stage. The goal is to halve the launch costs compared to Ariane 6.

=== Configurations ===
Different configurations of the launcher are being evaluated. Three versions are under consideration for different missions:

- A two-stage version
- A version with two small liquid propellant boosters
- A version with three first stages linked together, similar to Falcon Heavy

=== Return to Earth ===
Different systems are being studied for controlling the first stage's atmospheric re-entry:

- Grid fins, as on the first stage of Falcon 9
- Stabilization fins
- Air braking

=== Landing system ===
Different systems are being considered, ranging from everything on ground (all ground systems) to everything on the launcher (all on-board systems). Currently, development is focused on an on-board legs system similar to that of Falcon 9.

== See also ==
- Reusable Vehicle Testing
- List of European Space Agency programmes and missions
