= CALLISTO =

European-Japanese reusable rocket demonstrator

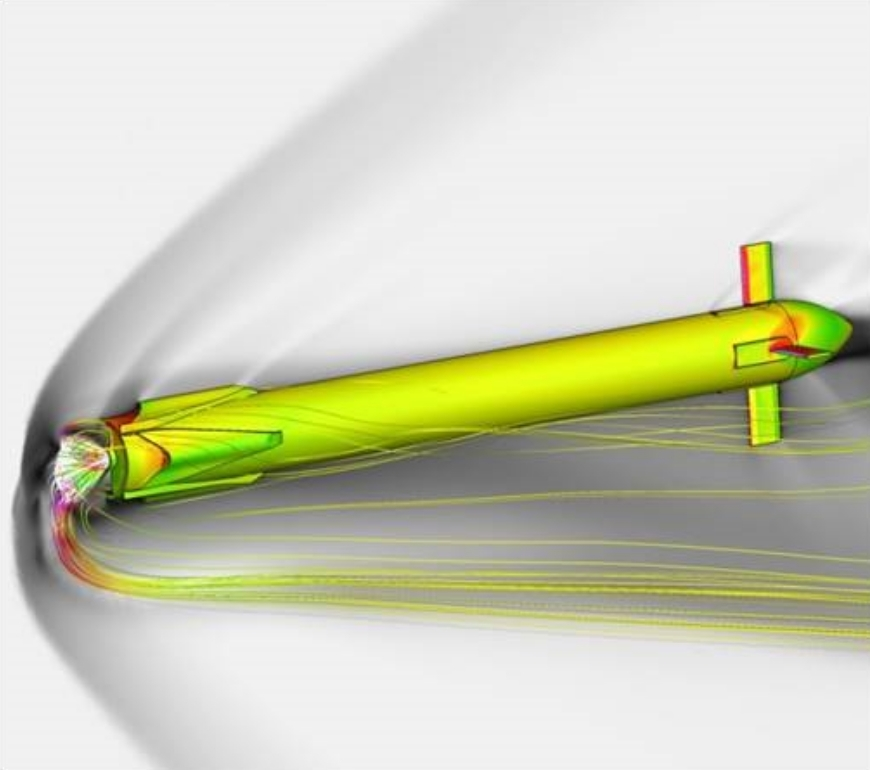
- Function: Technology demonstration
- Country of origin: Germany, France, Japan

Size
- Height: 13 m
- Diameter: 1.1 m
- Stages: 1

Launch history
- Status: Under construction
- First flight: 2027 (planned)

CALLISTO (Cooperative Action Leading to Launcher Innovation in Stage Toss-back Operations) is a reusable VTVL demonstrator propelled by a small 40 kN Japanese LOX-LH2 rocket engine. It is being developed jointly by the French (CNES), German (DLR), and Japanese (JAXA) national space agencies. JAXA's RV-X vehicle, first flown in 2026, serves as a Japanese technology pathfinder for CALLISTO.

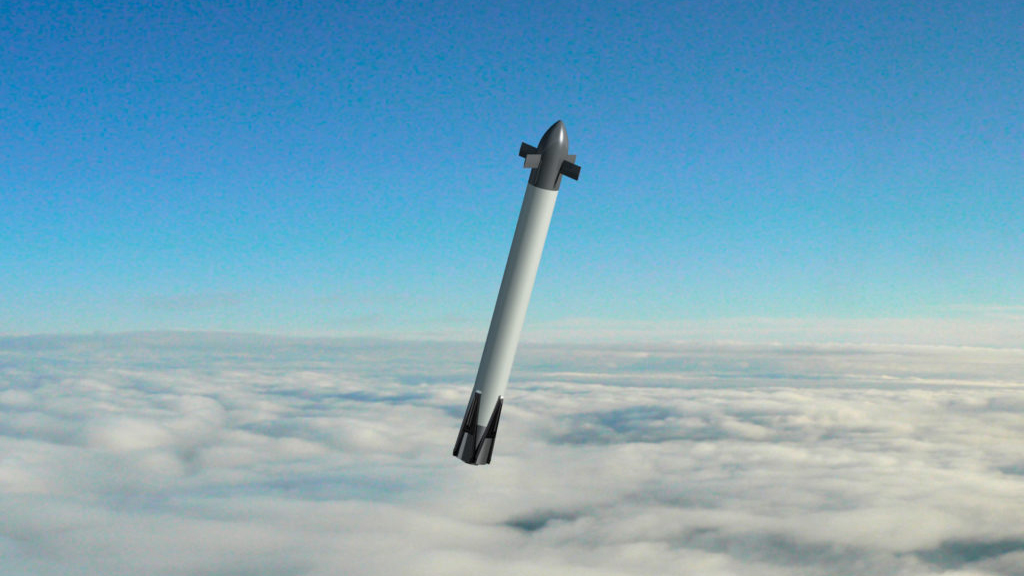
Early illustration of CALLISTO

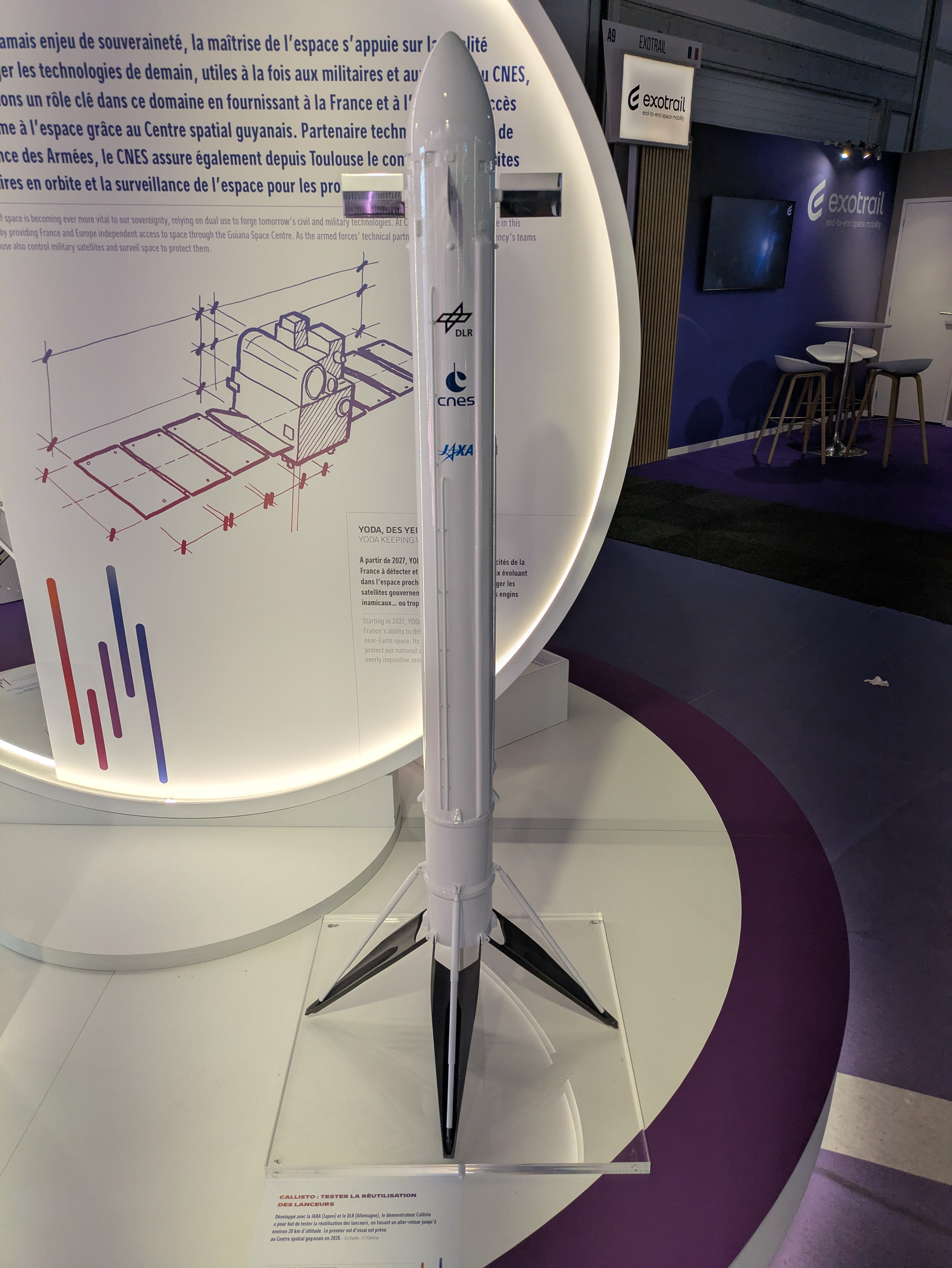
Model of CALLISTO at Paris Air Show 2025

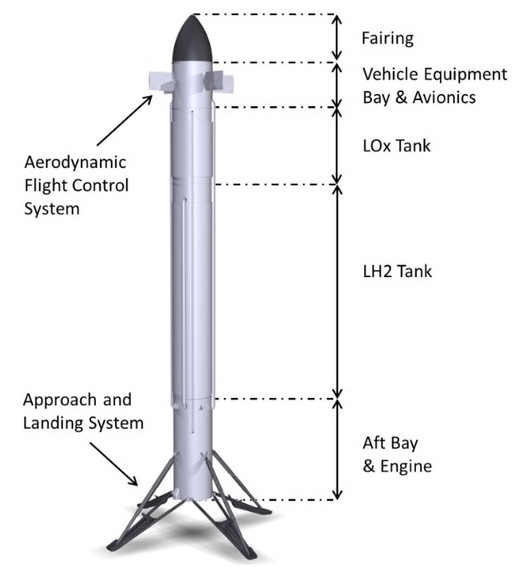
Overview of the architecture of CALLISTO

CALLISTO compared to other European and Japanese reusable rocket demonstrators including FD1 and Themis

The goals for CALLISTO are to mature and demonstrate the technologies which are necessary to build and operate a reusable launch vehicle, but also to better assess the operational cost of such a vehicle. The first flight was originally planned to occur in late 2020; it has since been postponed multiple times to 2027. Following the programme's conclusion, the experiences and technologies gained through CALLISTO will be harnessed to benefit other ongoing and future space programmes, such as the development of the European reusable launcher Ariane Next.

CALLISTO is distinct from a similar project Themis under development by ESA and from the DLR-developed Reusable Flight Experiment (ReFEx), which is a demonstrator of a winged reusable rocket first stage.

== Background ==
A major focus area for CALLISTO is to evaluate the maintenance, repair, and overhaul of the vehicle between flights; it is hoped that it could perform at least eight launches within six months. It is also sought to perform at least one landing with a minimum non-gravitational acceleration of 1.3g, as well as to demonstrate a large and rapid manoeuvre at low dynamic pressure and a vertical landing which includes both a boostback manoeuver and an unpowered aerodynamic manoeuver. The economics involved in all such operations are also to be stringently evaluated. In comparison to the established Ariane programme, CALLISTO has been described as being a relatively austere effort, operating on a budget between 1 and 2 percent of that allocated to Ariane.

Various aspects of the project have been divided between the partner agencies: the CNES is responsible for the hydrogen peroxide thrusters, telemetry, neutralisation system, ground segment, and will also perform final assembly of the equipment bay; the DLR is responsible for the fairing, navigation, fins, equipment bay structure, hydrogen tank, and the landing system; and at last, the JAXA is responsible for the oxygen tank, aft bay structure, power supply, and propulsion. All three organisations will work on the onboard computer and flight software. Experience and technologies are being drawn from multiple existing programmes, including the Vega expendable launch system and the Space Rider lifting body spaceplane.

== Launch facility ==
The flight test programme is set to be entirely performed at the newly-built commercial launch facility at the Guiana Space Centre, although considerations were made towards the use of alternative landing sites on both land and sea (the latter using barges). As of January 2025, the work to build the infrastructure needed to accommodate CALLISTO at its launch facility was expected to begin in the second half of 2025.

== Schedule ==
In 2018, the project's timetable had scheduled the first flight of the rocket to take place sometime in late 2020, as well as for flight testing to be completed by the end of 2021. By mid 2019, flight tests were expected to start in 2022. This was later updated to a 2025–2026 timeframe As of 2025, the initial test flights were expected to begin from the Guiana Space Centre in 2026. As of September 2026, the test flights were expected to take place in 2027 with increasingly complex missions spread over approximately eight months.

== History ==
During the 2010s, various aerospace entities, both in the public and private sector, became increasingly interested in the aspect of reusability, in particular Vertical takeoff, vertical landing (VTVL) rocket elements, as a means of reducing the cost of space-based activities. Companies such as SpaceX had demonstrated their own progress in the field, leading to agencies in Russia, China, and Europe announcing their own reusable rocket projects. By the mid-2010s, development of the pan-European Ariane 6 launcher was well-underway, and incorporated a reusable engine. However, some officials in both France and Germany felt that greater emphasis on reusability was necessary, and that future rockets needed to go beyond what was then underway. According, these nations begun to collaborate on a tentative research effort that would crystalise as CALLISTO; a test rocket aimed at investigating, demonstrating, and maturing relevant technologies in the field of reusability.

Upon the project's launch in 2015, CALLISTO was not driven by the European Space Agency (ESA); instead, it was originally a joint project between the CNES and DLR alone. In June 2017, the JAXA opted to join the CALLISTO partnership; around this time, it was agreed that Japan will provide the engine for the rocket, that being the 40 kN re-ignitable LOx/LH2 engine developed by JAXA for its Reusable Sounding Rocket programme. It will be modified to generate 15 percent greater thrust and to provide a throttling range from 16 to 46 kN, permitting adequate control of the vehicle during the landing phase.

Following the project's preliminary design review in late 2019, the vehicle's configuration was frozen. Possessing a height of 13.5 m and a diameter of 1.1 m, CALLISTO is a relatively compact rocket, a feat aided by its role as a demonstrator rather that an end product in and of itself. It will have a dry mass of 1,520 kg and a take-off mass of 3,600 kg. The flight control system incorporates a total of four deployable fins, along with two electromechanical actuators to gimble the engine, and eight hydrogen peroxide thrusters amongst other elements. It is furnished with four deployable landing legs for use during the landing phase. In 2021, CALLISTO passed its System Design Key Point, confirming the definition of the preliminary system design review.

In September 2024, DLR has begun testing the qualification model of CALLISTO's fairing in Bremen. In March 2025, the Vehicle Equipment Bay (VEB) and fairing module were transported from Bremen and Stuttgart to Toulouse. After that, DLR and CNES have begun acoustic testing on VEB, which houses much of the demonstrator's electronics. In April 2025, DLR has completed the qualification campaign for the rocket's "Top Block" (VEB+fairing), including the vehicle's avionics, telemetry, communications, and flight control systems. In July 2025, DLR has completed the manufacturing of the first component of the reusable thermal protection system for the rocket's landing legs and in October 2025, the qualification model of CALLISTO's landing leg has been delivered to the DLR Institute of Space Systems in Bremen for testing. In December 2025, factory acceptance tests of the ground support robot for CALLISTO, developed by Technip Energies (T.EN), were underway at Le Castellet airport in France. In February 2026, DLR has completed vibration tests of CALLISTO's landing leg at the ATLAS EMS facilities in Bremen.

In July 2026, JAXA performed the first low altitude test flight of the RV-X rocket, a pathfinder for CALLISTO, at the Noshiro Testing Center. During the flight, the vehicle reached an altitude of 11 metres, travelled 16 metres horizontally while maintaining an upright position and landed safely. JAXA planned for subsequent tests to reach an altitude of approximately 100 metres.

On 21 August 2026, Nammo announced the delivery of its hydrogen peroxide propulsion system for the vehicle's reaction control system to CNES. On 11 September 2026, DLR completed final testing of the vehicle's nose cone before its transfer to France for final integration.

== See also ==
- Themis programme – European reusable rocket demonstrator programme
- FD1 – European suborbital rocket demonstrator
- Prometheus (rocket engine) – Methalox spacecraft propulsion system
- Ariane Next – Orbital recoverable launch vehicle of the European company ArianeGroup
- Maia (rocket) – French orbital reusable rocket of the company MaiaSpace
