= Guiana Space Centre =

French and European spaceport in French Guiana

- Centre spatial guyanais

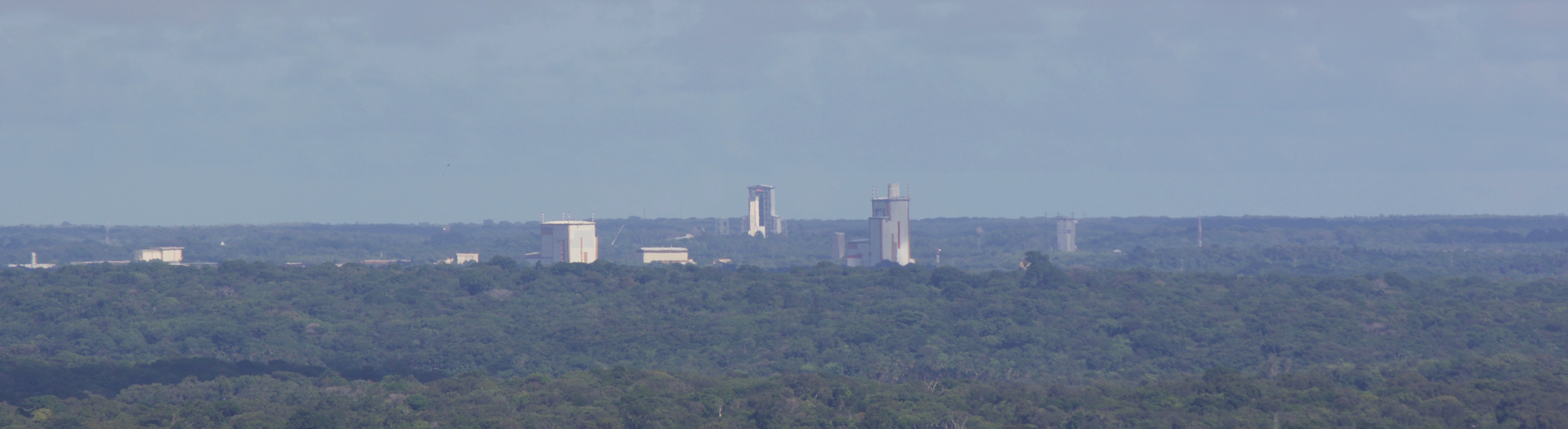
- Panoramic view of Guiana Space Centre

Agency overview
- Formed: 14 April 1964; 62 years ago
- Jurisdiction: Government of France
- Headquarters: Kourou, French Guiana
- Employees: 1,700 direct (2020); 7,500 indirect (2011)
- Agency executive: Philippe Lier, Director
- Parent agency: ESA / CNES
- Website: centrespatialguyanais.cnes.fr

Map
- Map of Guiana Space Centre

- Detailed map Detailed map of Carbet Toukan pads

Guiana Space Centre
- Interactive map of Guiana Space Centre
- Coordinates: 5°10′08″N 52°41′25″W
- Operator: Arianespace, ESA
- Total launches: 336
- Launch pad: 7

Launch history
- Status: Active
- First launch: 10 March 1970
ELFS launch history
- Status: Inactive
- Launches: 412
- First launch: 1968
- Last launch: 1981
- Associated rockets: Sounding rockets
ALD/ELM launch history
- Status: Inactive
- Launches: 8
- First launch: 10 March 1970; Diamant B (Mika / Wika)
- Last launch: 27 September 1975; Diamant BP4 (Aura)
- Associated rockets: Retired: Diamant; Future: Miura 5, RFA One, Spectrum, CALLISTO, Themis, Zephyr, SL1
ELA-1 / ELV launch history
- Status: Active
- Launches: 56
- First launch: 5 November 1971; Europa II (STV 4)
- Last launch: 15 September 2026; Vega C (Sentinel-3C, FLEX)
- Associated rockets: Current: Vega C; Retired: Ariane 1, Ariane 2, Ariane 3, Europa II, Vega
ELA-2 launch history
- Status: Inactive
- Launches: 119
- First launch: 28 March 1986; Ariane 3 (GStar-2)
- Last launch: 15 February 2003; Ariane 4 (Intelsat 907)
- Associated rockets: Retired: Ariane 2, Ariane 3, Ariane 4
ELA-3 launch history
- Status: Inactive
- Launches: 117
- First launch: 4 June 1996; Ariane 5 (Cluster)
- Last launch: 5 July 2023; Ariane 5 (Syracuse 4B / Heinrich Hertz)
- Associated rockets: Retired: Ariane 5; Future: Vega-E
ELS launch history
- Status: Inactive
- Launches: 27
- First launch: 21 October 2011; Soyuz ST-B (Galileo)
- Last launch: 10 February 2022; Soyuz ST-B (OneWeb L13)
- Associated rockets: Suspended: Soyuz ST-A, Soyuz ST-B; Future: Maia
ELA-4 launch history
- Status: Active
- Launches: 9
- First launch: 9 July 2024; Ariane 6 (multiple payloads)
- Last launch: 27 August 2026; Ariane 6 (MTG-I2)
- Associated rockets: Current: Ariane 6

The Guiana Space Centre (French: Centre spatial guyanais; CSG), also called Europe's Spaceport, is a spaceport to the northwest of Kourou in French Guiana, an overseas region of France in South America. Kourou is located approximately 500 kilometres (310 mi; 270 nmi) north of the equator at a latitude of 5°. In operation since 1968, it is a suitable location for a spaceport because of its near equatorial location and open sea to the east and north.

At CSG, space launches are conducted by several European private companies and government agencies working together. The CSG land itself is managed by CNES, the French national space agency. The launch infrastructure built on the CSG land is owned by the European Space Agency (ESA). Private companies design and produce the rockets, and operate the launches including planning missions, handling customer relationships and overseeing the team at CSG that integrates and prepares vehicles for launch.

As of 2026, two rockets are launched from CSG: Vega C, a medium-lift launch vehicle and Ariane 6, a medium to heavy-lift launch vehicle.

== History ==
In 1964, Guiana was selected to become the spaceport of France, replacing France's first launch site Centre interarmées d'essais d'engins spéciaux in Hammaguir (Algeria) after Algeria's independence. In 1975, France offered to share Kourou with the ESA, with ESA covering today two thirds of Guiana Space Centre's budget. Commercial launches are also bought by non-European companies. ESA pays two-thirds of the spaceport's annual budget and has also financed the upgrades made during the development of the Ariane launchers.

On 4 April 2017, the center was occupied by 30 labour unions and indigenous peoples leaders in the midst of the 2017 social unrest in French Guiana. The center resumed operation on 24 April 2017, after an emergency relief plan of up to 2.1 billion euros was authorized by the French government.

== Facilities ==
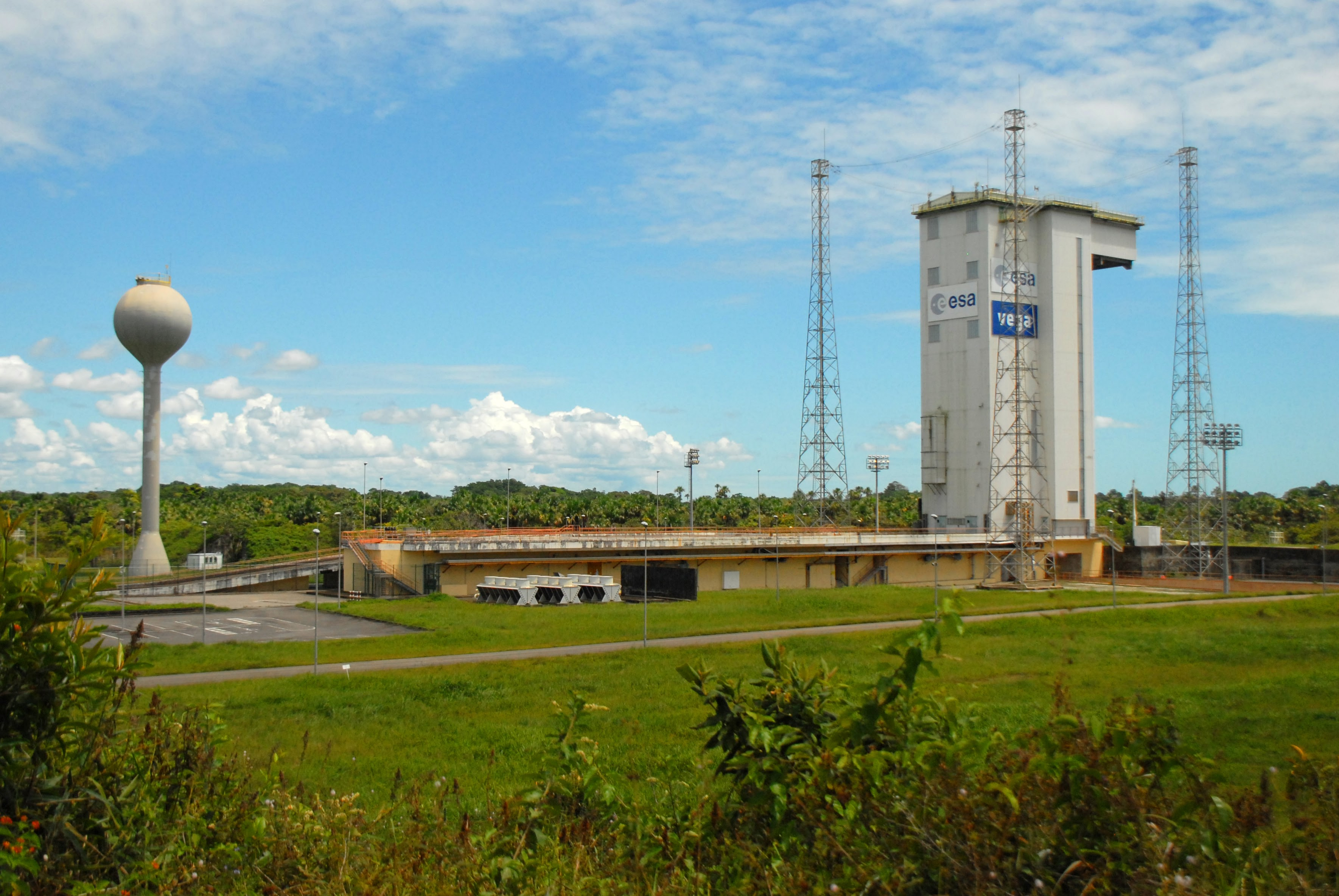
Vega launch pad in 2017

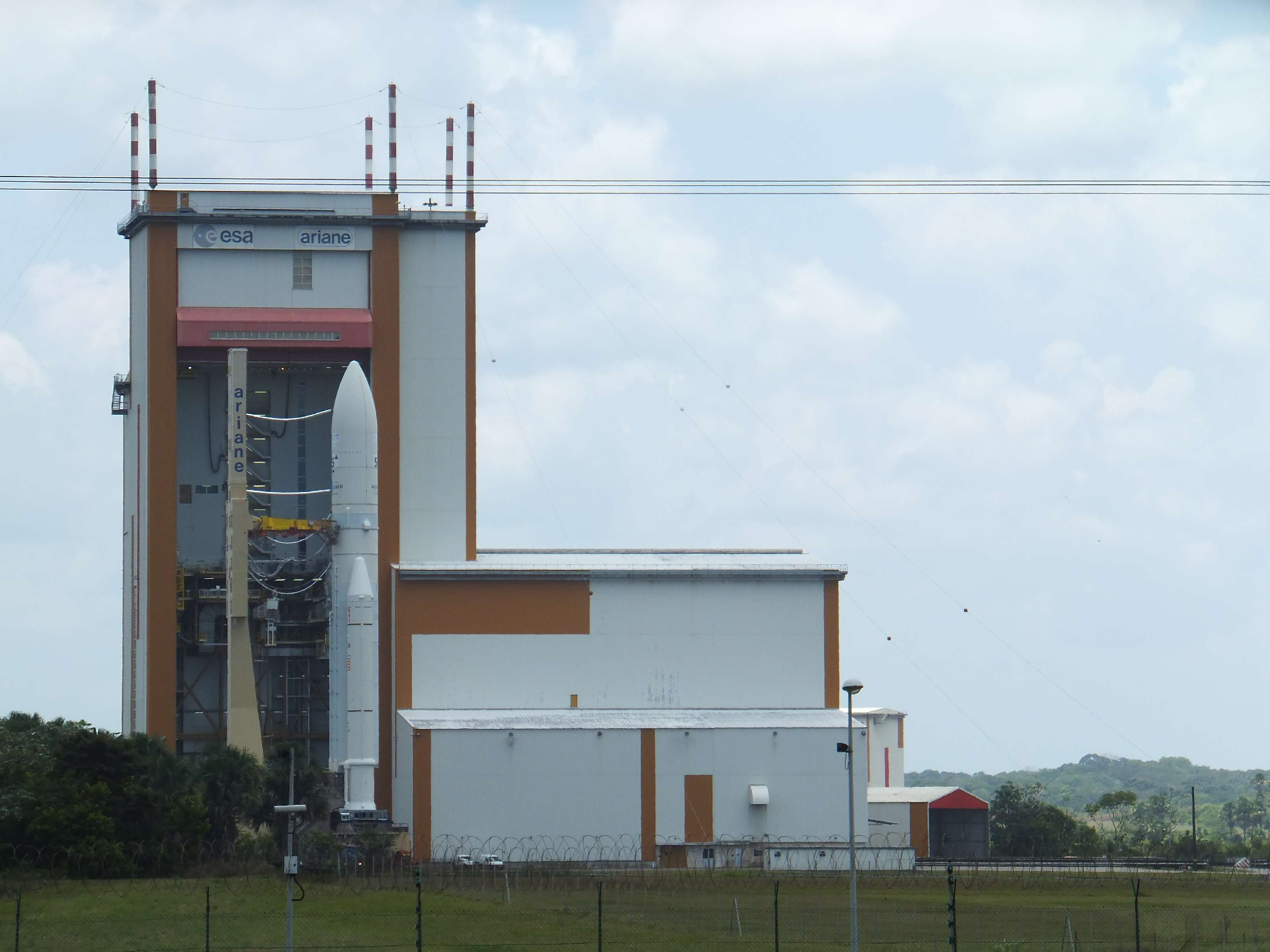
Ariane 5 final assembly building

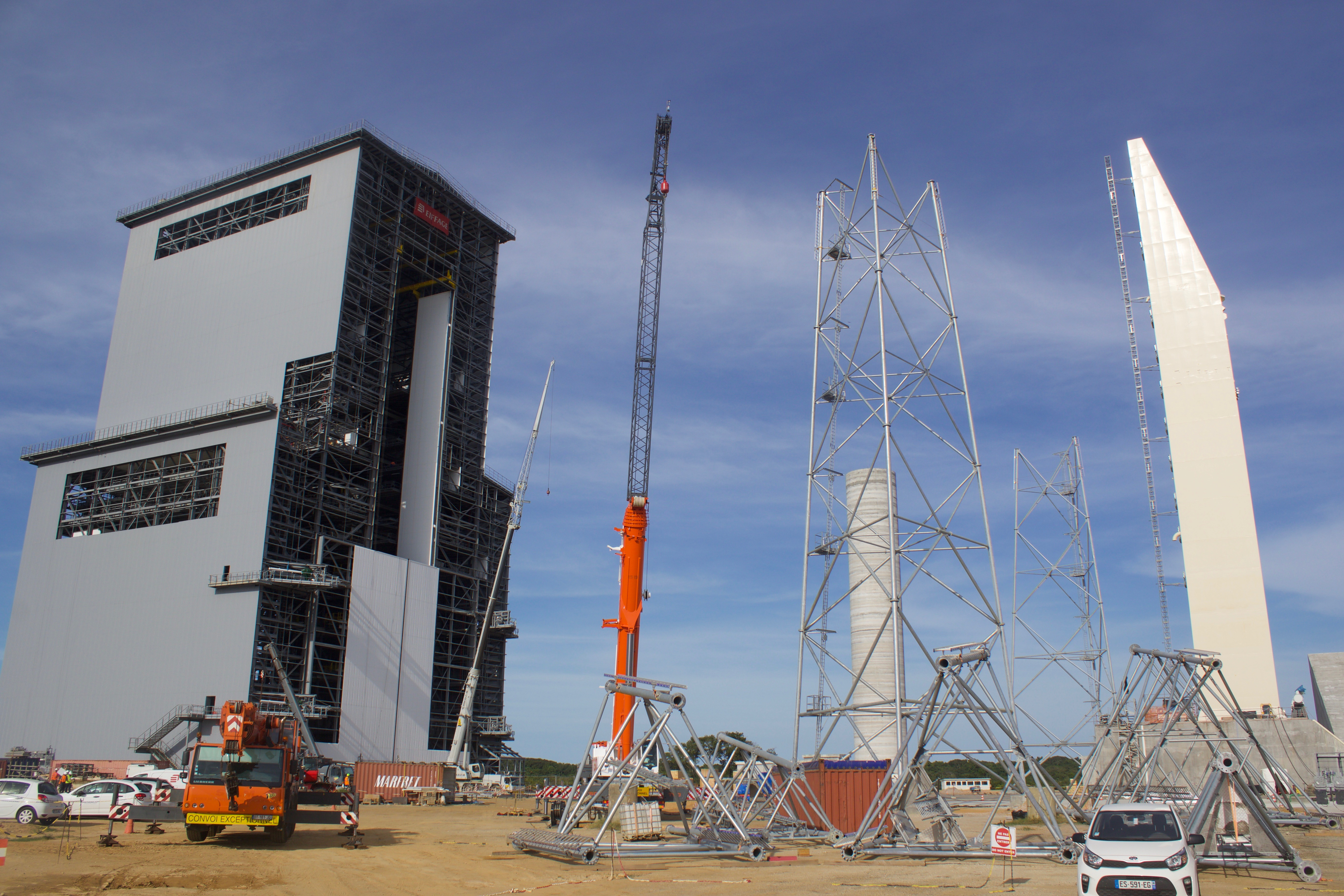
Ariane 6 pad in 2019

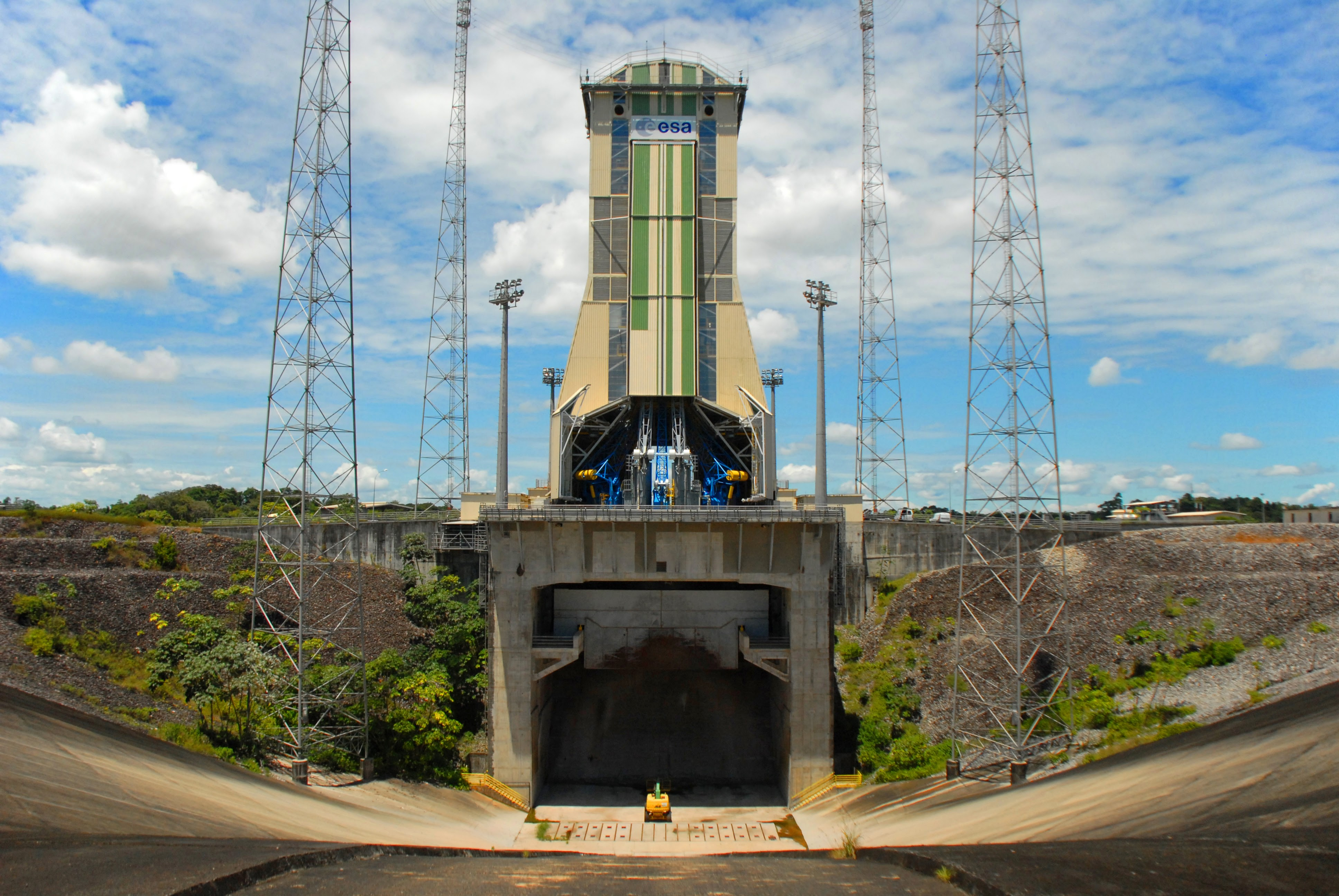
Soyuz-2 mobile service tower and flame trench

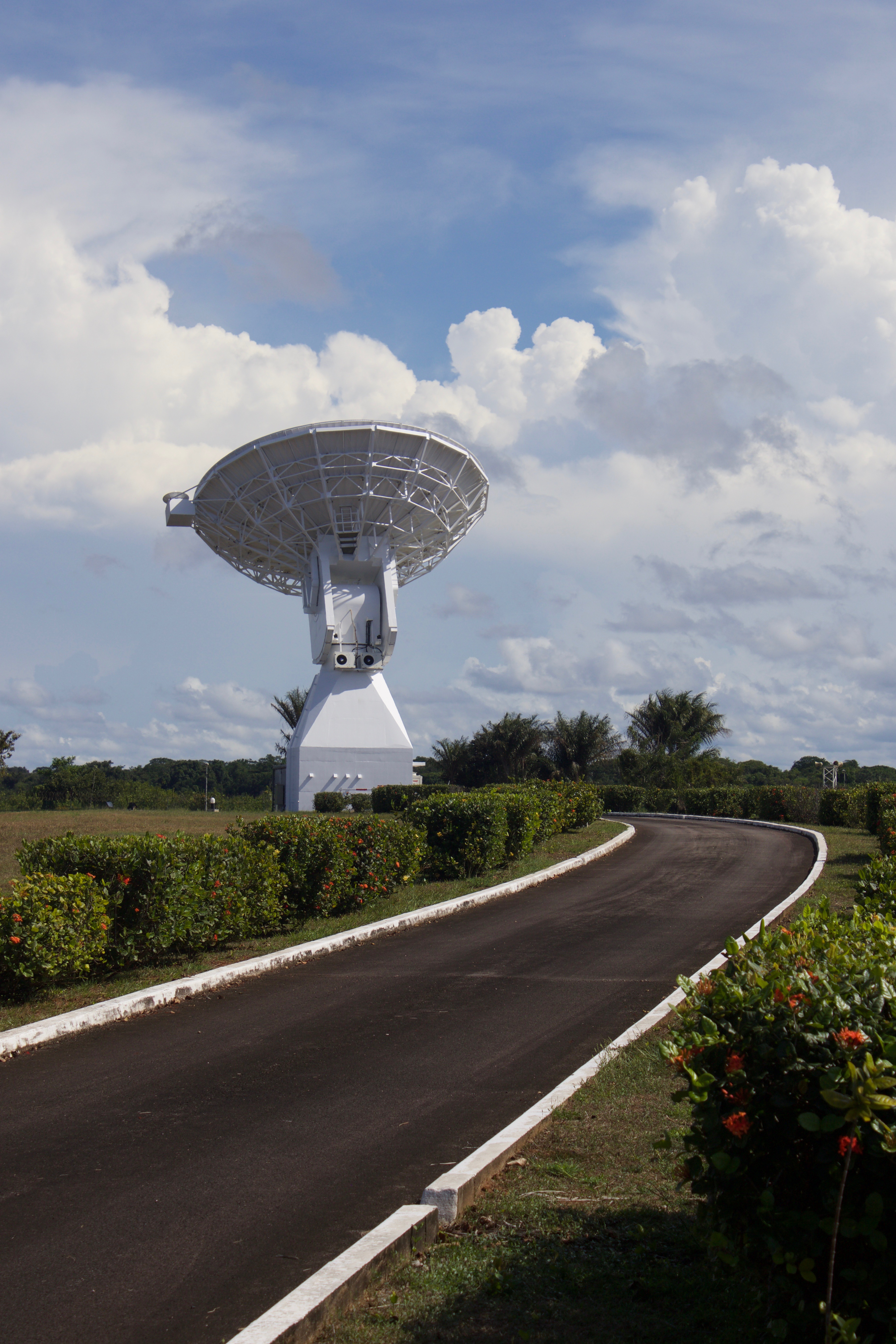
Kourou ESTRACK station antenna

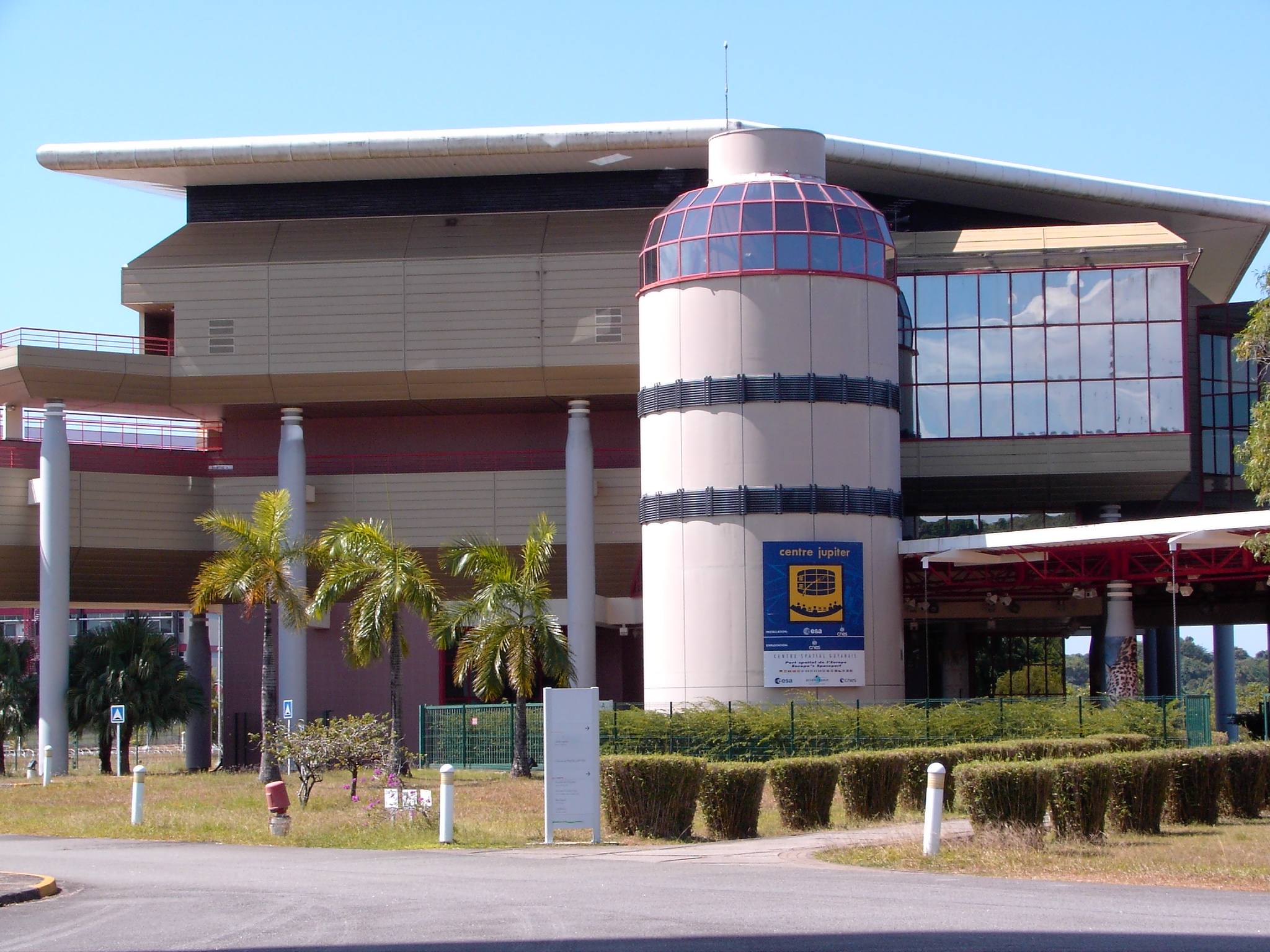
Jupiter Mission Control Centre exterior

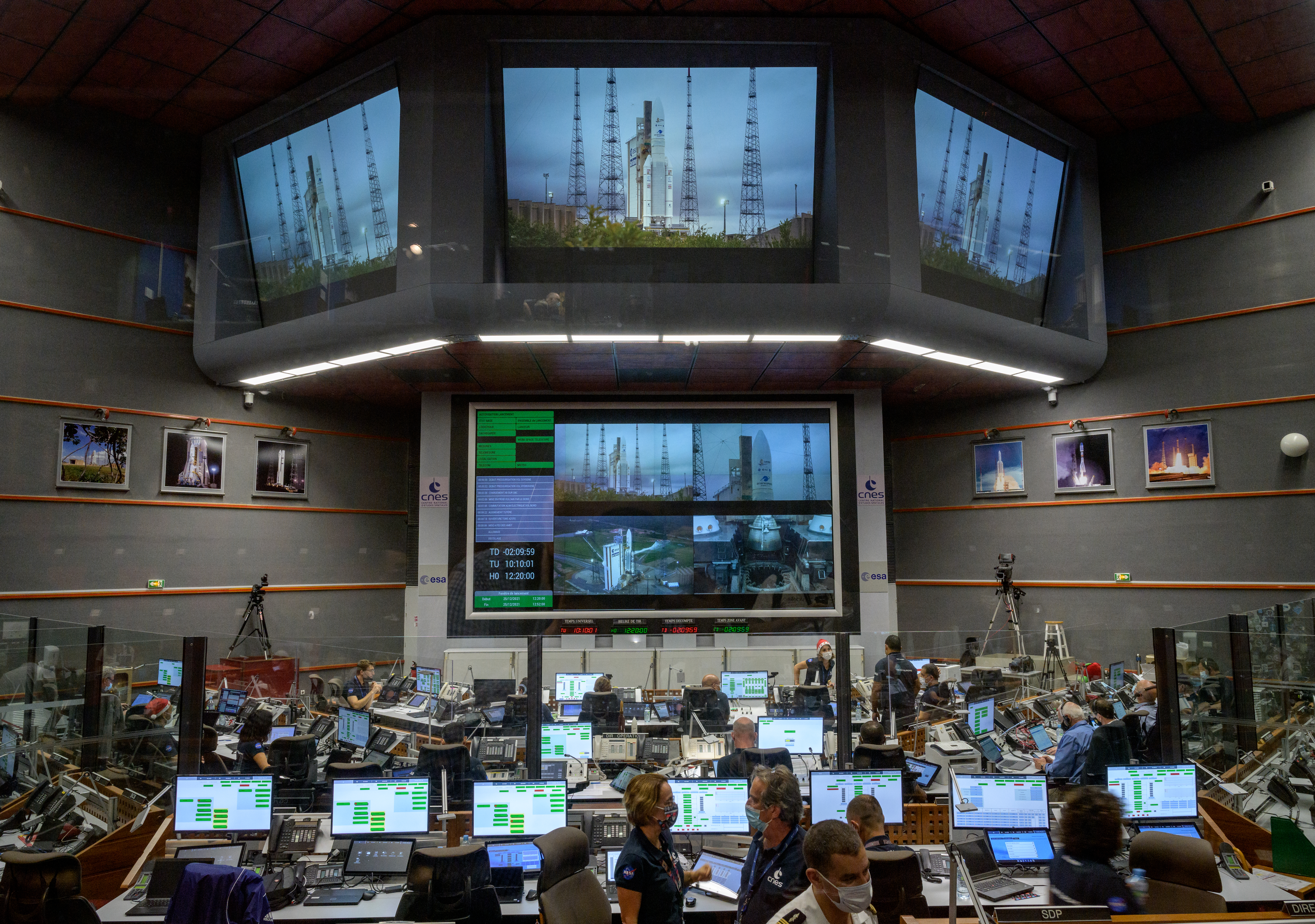
Jupiter Mission Control Centre during the launch of the James Webb Space Telescope, 2021

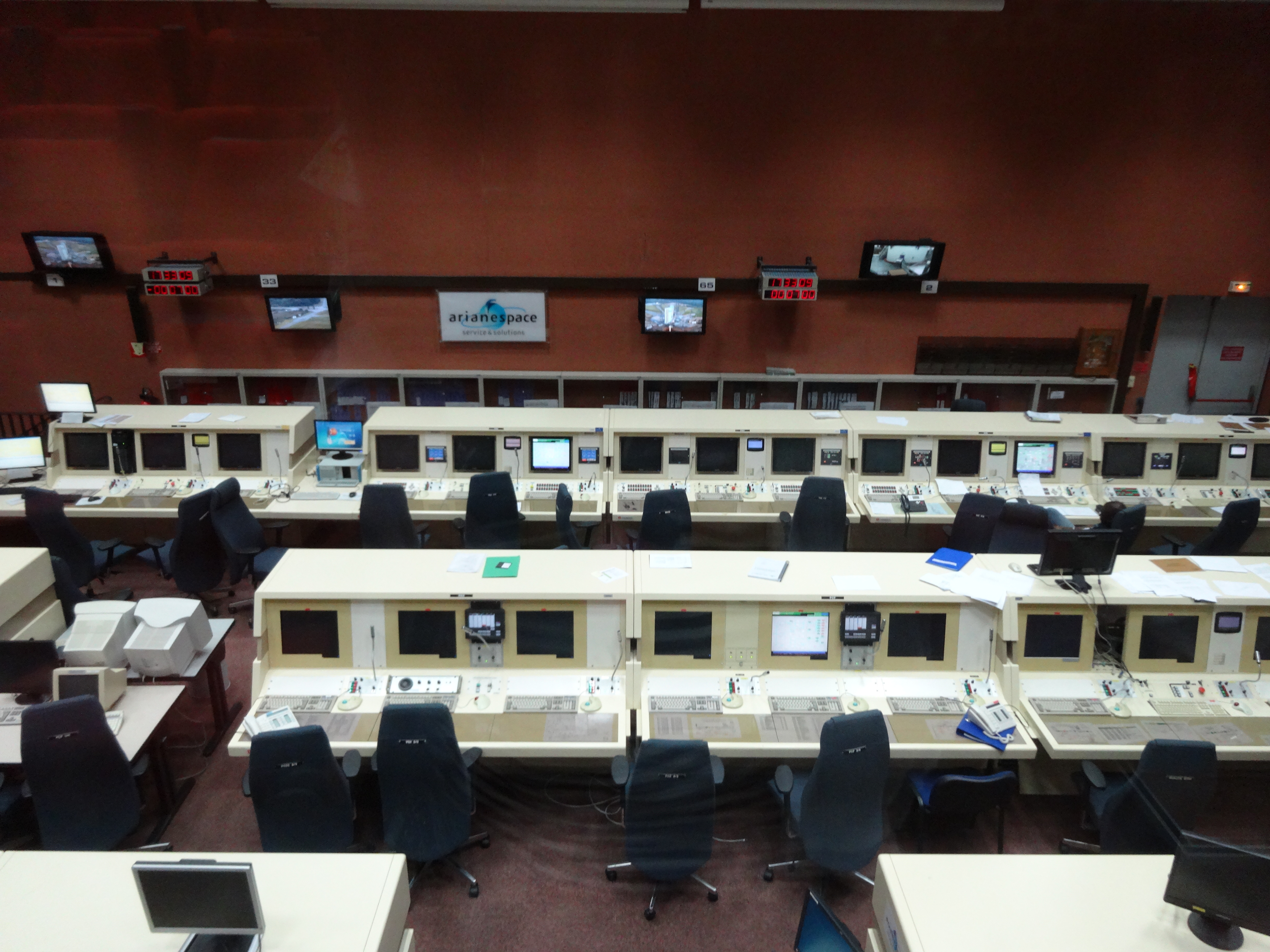
Launch control centre (CDL)

The location of the space centre was selected based on various factors. One of the primary benefits of this spaceport is its proximity to the equator, which makes it more efficient, requiring substantially less energy, to launch spacecraft into a near-equatorial, geostationary orbit compared to launching from spaceports at higher latitudes.

Additionally, the centre's location adjacent to the open sea to the east reduces the potential risk of rocket stages and debris from launch failures falling on or near human settlements, which enhances safety during spaceflight activities.

Furthermore, rockets typically launch towards the east to take advantage of Earth's rotation and the angular momentum it provides. The near-equatorial location of the Guiana Space Centre offers an advantage for launches to low-inclination or geostationary Earth orbits, as rockets can be launched into orbits with an inclination of as low as 6°. In contrast, a rocket launched from Cape Canaveral Space Force Station, with a latitude of 28.5°, can only be launched to an inclination of 28.5°, requiring a significant amount of propellant to change the inclination.

The location of the Guiana Space Centre provides benefits for launching spacecraft into low-inclination or geostationary Earth orbits. Rockets of similar size to those used at other spaceports to place satellites into geostationary transfer orbit (GTO), such as the Proton and Ariane 5 rockets, can send similar payloads to a low Earth orbit (LEO). For example, the Proton rocket, launched from high latitudes in Russia, can only send 6,270 kg to GTO, while the Kourou-launched Ariane 5 can send more than 10,000 kg to GTO.

=== ALD/ELM ===
In 1969 a launch pad for the Diamant rocket was built. The first launch took place in 1970, which was also the first satellite launch from Kourou. More launches followed, but the pad was decommissioned in 1975.

Beginning 2019 the pad is being reactivated. Multiple companies have announced that they would be using the pad for microlaunchers. Among them are Isar Aerospace, Rocket Factory Augsburg, ArianeGroup, PLD Space, Latitude, HyImpulse and Avio with their Spectrum, RFA One, Callisto, Themis, Miura 5, Zephyr and SL1 rockets. The pad will then be renamed ELM (French: Ensemble de Lancement Multilanceurs, lit. 'Multi-launcher Launch Complex'). It is likely that PLD space will first use the pad in 2025.

=== BEC/ELA-1/ELV ===
Originally built in the 1960s under the name of Base Équatoriale du CECLES (English: ELDO Equatorial Base), the pad was designed for the Europa-II launch vehicle. One Europa-II was launched from the site in 1971, which ended in failure due to a guidance problem, before the program was cancelled.

The pad at Guiana was demolished and subsequently rebuilt as the first launch complex for Ariane as ELA (Ensemble de Lancement Ariane). Redesignated later as ELA-1, it was used for Ariane 1 and Ariane 2 and 3 launches until being retired in 1989.

In November 2001, it was refurbished again for the Vega rocket and renamed ELV (Ensemble de Lancement Vega). The first launch was on 13 February 2012.

=== ELA-2 ===
The ELA-2 pad (Ensemble de Lancement Ariane-2), built in 1986, had been used for Ariane 4 launches from 1988 until 2003. Before 1988, although purpose-built for Ariane 4, the pad hosted an Ariane-2 and two Ariane-3 launches. The complex consisted of two areas: the launcher preparation zone and the launch pad, separated by one kilometre, allowing a launcher to be assembled in the preparation zone while another launch from the pad. A mobile service tower at the launch pad provided a protected environment for payload installation and final preparation of the rocket. Following the retirement of the Ariane 4 in favour of the Ariane 5, In September 2011, the pad's service tower was demolished using explosives.

=== ELA-3 ===
ELA-3 (Ensemble de Lancement Ariane-3) was active between 4 June 1996 and 5 July 2023, launching the Ariane 5. This facility covers an area of 21 km^{2} (8.1 sq mi).

In the future the site will be adapted by Avio for Vega-E launches.

=== ELA-4 ===
ELA4 is located along the Route de l'Espace in the Roche Christine site between the ELA-3 and ELS launch facilities. CNES was responsible for the construction of the Ariane 6 ground segments including the new launch pad. Earthworks on the 150 hectare launch site began at the end of June 2015 and was completed at the start of 2016. Four platforms were levelled to accommodate the launch pad, the liquid oxygen and hydrogen tanks and the assembly building. Civil engineering works on the flame trench and other buildings began in the summer of 2016 and ended in 2019. The new launch facility was inaugurated on 28 September 2021 with first flight of the Ariane 6 conducted on 9 July 2024.

=== ELS / Soyuz at CSG ===
ESA has built ELS (Ensemble de Lancement Soyouz) for launching Russian-built Soyuz-2 rockets. The first Soyuz launch from ELS was postponed several times, but launched on 21 October 2011.

ELS is located on the territory of Sinnamary commune, 27 km (17 mi) from Kourou harbour. It is 10 km (6.2 mi) northwest of the site used for the Ariane 5 launches. Under the terms of the Russo-European joint venture, ESA will augment its own launch vehicle fleet with Soyuz rockets – using them to launch ESA or commercial payloads – and the Russians will get access to the Kourou spaceport for launching their own payloads with Soyuz rockets. Russia will use the Guiana Space Centre in addition to Baikonur Cosmodrome. The Guiana location has the significant benefit of greatly increased payload capability, owing to the near equatorial position. A Soyuz rocket with a 1.7 tones to geostationary transfer orbit performance from Baikonur will increase its payload potential to 2.8 tones from the Guiana launch site.

The ELS project is being co-funded by Arianespace, ESA, and the European Union, with CNES being the prime contractor. The project has a projected cost of approximately €320 million, where €120 million are allocated for modernizing the Soyuz vehicle. The official opening of the launch site construction occurred on 27 February 2007.

On 13 September 2010, Spaceflight Now reported that after several delays in the construction of a mobile gantry the launch pad had been finished, and the first flight of the Soyuz was expected to occur in early 2011. By October 2010, 18 launch contracts were signed. Arianespace has ordered 24 launchers from Russian industry.

On 21 October 2011, two Galileo IOV-1 and IOV-2 satellites were launched using a Soyuz-ST rocket, in the "first Russian Soyuz vehicle ever launched from Europe's Spaceport in French Guiana."

On 26 February 2022, Roscosmos announced that it was suspending operations at ELS as a reaction to international sanctions during the Russo-Ukrainian war. According to Stephane Israël, CEO of Arianespace, "there will no longer be Soyuz launches" from the Guiana Space Center.

In April 2024 CNES put out a call to take over the launch pad. In September the same year MaiaSpace was chosen to use the pad for their two-stage Maia rocket. The company want to invest tens of millions of euros and aims for an inaugural launch in late 2025. ESA retains a right to select another company of their European Launch Challenge to also use the pad.

=== Final assembly building ===
Astrium assembles each Ariane 5 launcher in the Launcher Integration Building. The vehicle is then delivered to the Final Assembly Building for payload integration by Arianespace. The Final Assembly Building is located 2.8 km (1.7 mi) from the ELA-3 launch zone. The mobile launch table completes the trip with an Ariane 5 in about one hour. It is then secured in place over the launch pad's flame ducts.

== Launches ==
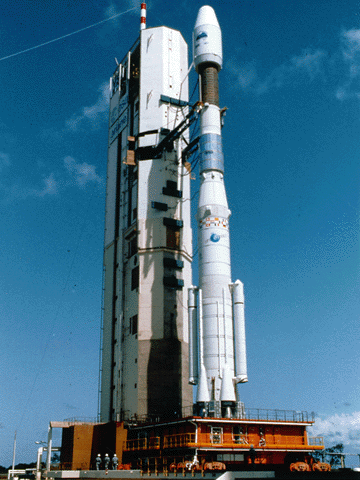
Ariane 4 launched from the Guiana Space Centre on 10 August 1992.

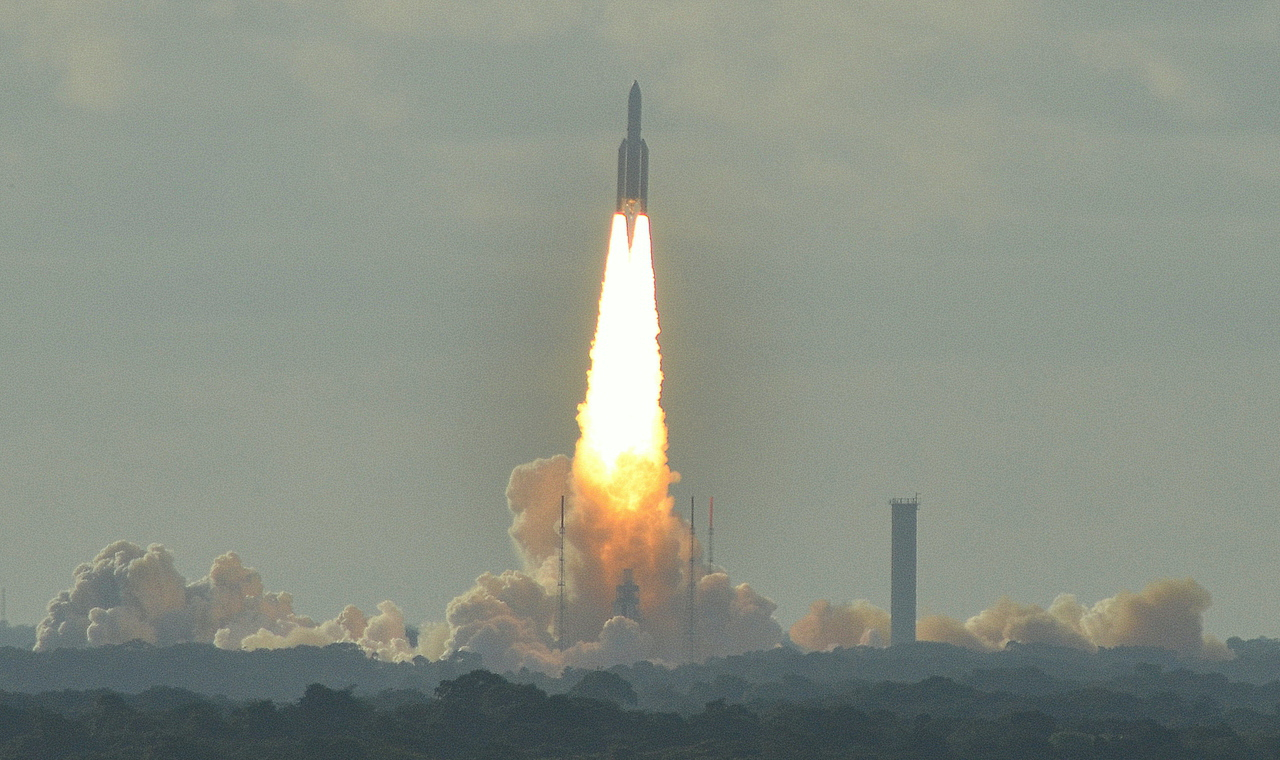
An Ariane 5 lifts off from Kourou on 29 August 2013.

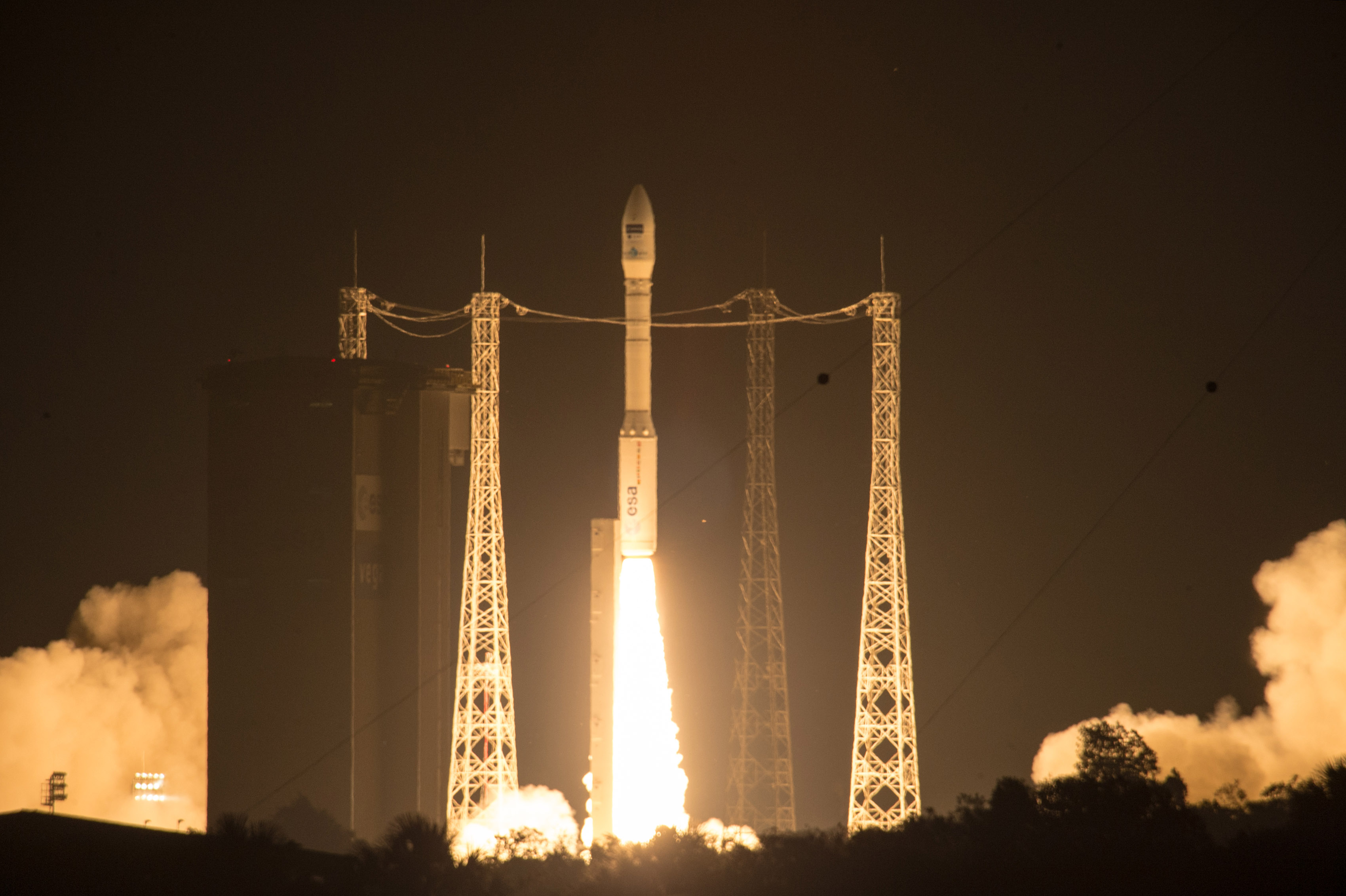
Sentinel-2A launch on Vega on 23 June 2015.

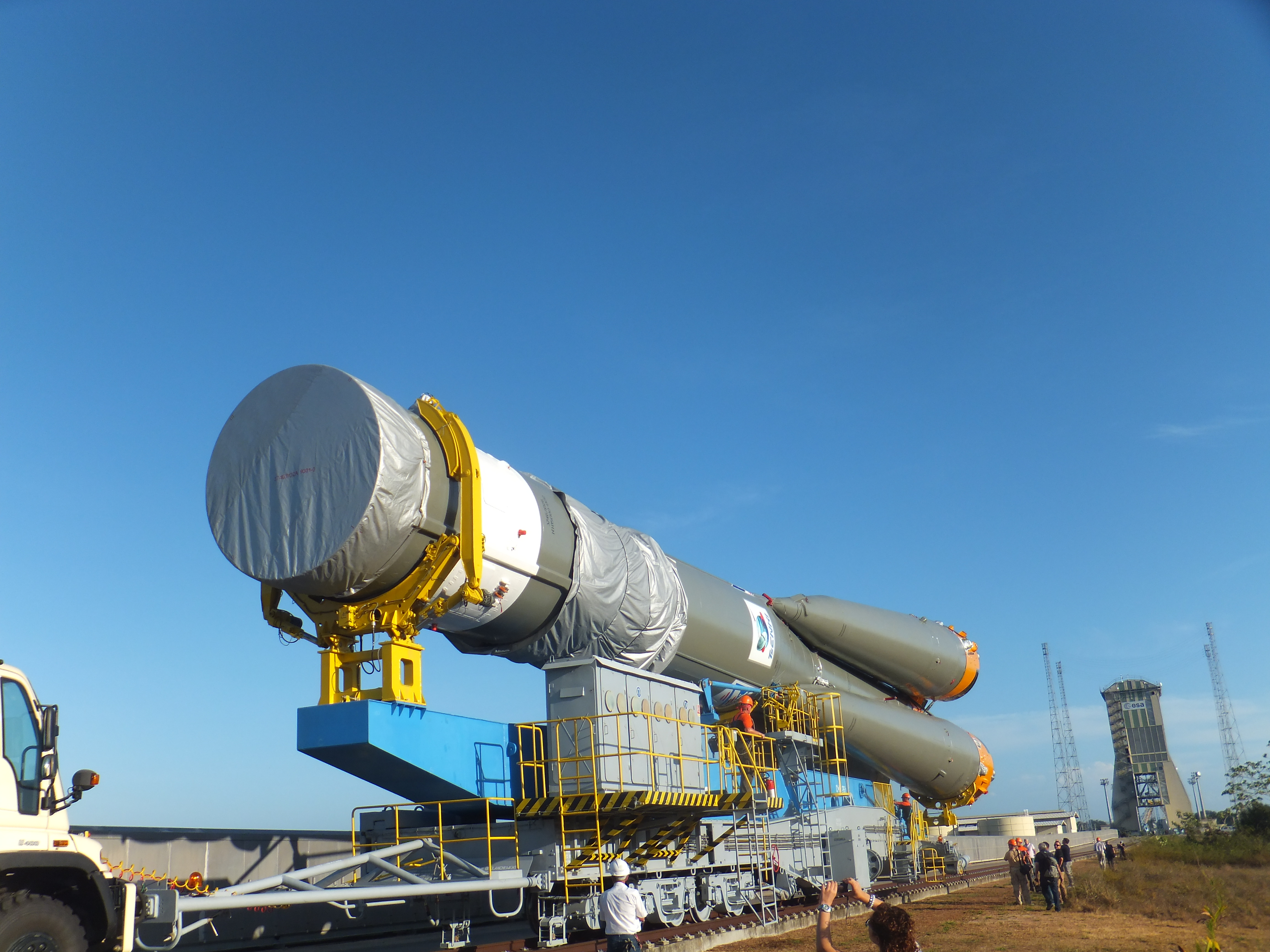
Soyuz rollout to ELS pad on 9 October 2012.

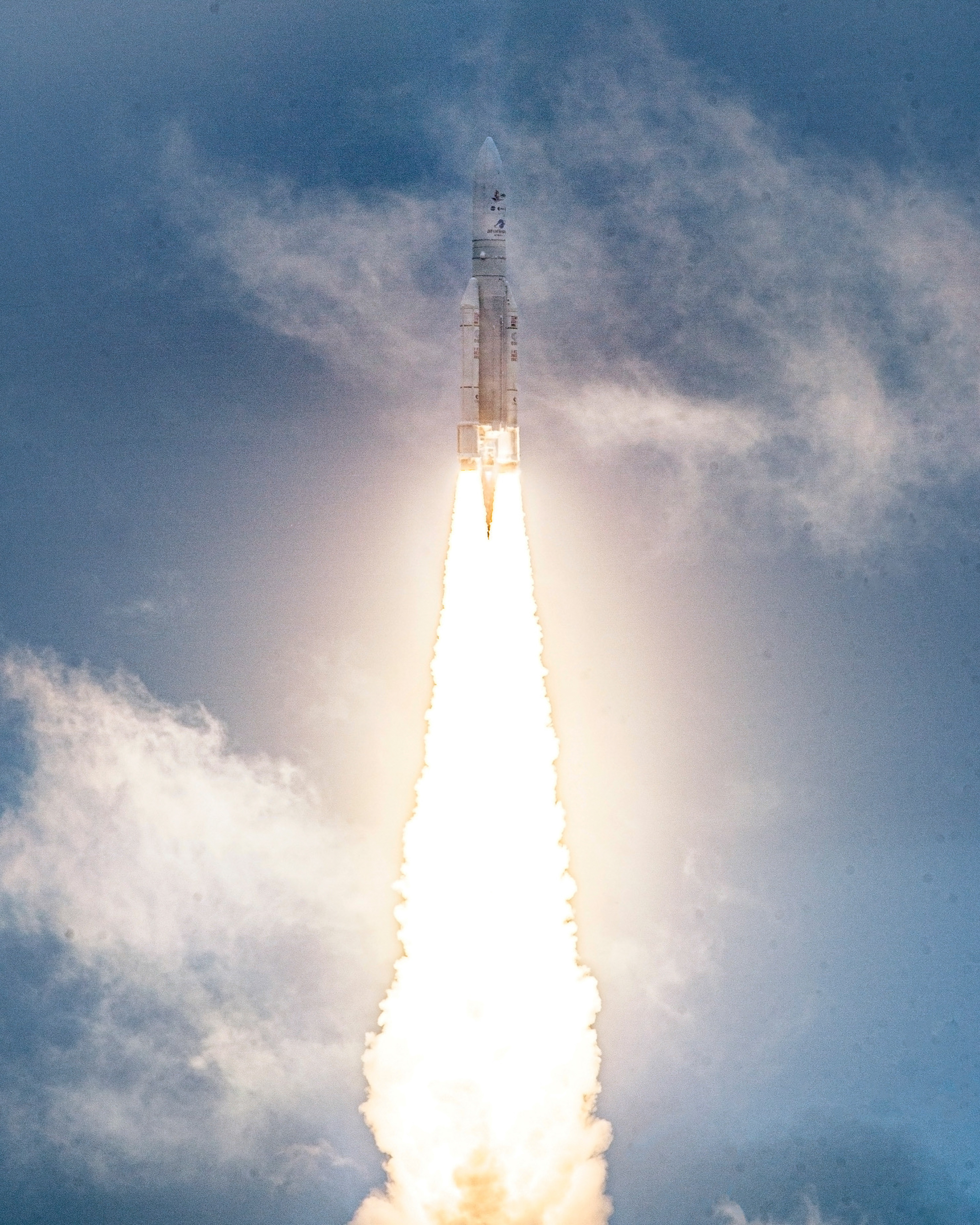
Ariane 5 flight VA256 lifts off from Kourou with the James Webb Space Telescope on 25 December 2021.

=== Launch safety ===
Fire safety is ensured by a detachment of the Paris Fire Brigade, a branch of the French Army. Security around the base is ensured by French Gendarmerie forces, assisted by the 3rd Foreign Infantry Regiment of the French Foreign Legion. Before and during launch windows, CSG facility security is significantly enhanced by anti-personnel and anti-aircraft measures, the exact configurations of which are classified by the French military. All entrants to the launch complex are also subject to checks for proof of permission to enter the facility.

The Guiana Space Centre (as per CNES) also contains the Îles du Salut, a former penal colony including the infamous Devil's Island. Now a tourist site, the islands are under the launching trajectory for geosynchronous orbit and have to be evacuated during launches.

=== Early launches ===
- 10 March 1970 – The first Diamant-B launched the DIAL/MIKA and DIAL/WIKA satellites. DIAL/MIKA failed during launch, but it entered orbit with a total mass of 111 kg. DIAL/WIKA provided data for about two months after launch.

=== Recent launches ===
- 21 May 2011 – 04:38 (GMT+08:00) An Ariane 5 ECA launch vehicle launched carrying ST-2 Satellite twice as powerful Singtel's first satellite ST-1, which was launched back in 1998. It will provide 20% more transponder capacity and a wider coverage footprint than ST-1, with C-band and Ku-band coverage of the Middle East, Central Asia, Indian subcontinent and Southeast Asia.
- 21 October 2011 – A Soyuz-2 carrying two Galileo satellites was launched. This was the first launch of a Soyuz rocket at the Centre Spatial Guyanais.
- 17 December 2011 – A Soyuz carrying the French space agency's Pleiades 1 Earth imaging satellite, four ELISA electronic intelligence satellites, and the SSOT remote sensing satellite for the Chilean military. This was the second launch of a Soyuz at the Guiana Space Centre.
- 13 February 2012 – The Vega, which was designed in Italy, lifted off at 10:00 UTC on its maiden voyage. The launcher released nine satellites into orbit: two Italian satellites and seven pico-satellites.
- 5 July 2012 – The uncrewed Ariane 5 rocket took off to send an American communication satellite and European weather-monitoring spacecraft into orbit. Liftoff occurred at 21:36 UTC.
- 30 August 2013 – Indian Space Research Organisation (ISRO) launched the advanced multi-band communication satellite GSAT-7. It was 17th Indian satellite launched from ESA with Ariane 5.
- 16 October 2014 – An Ariane 5 launch vehicle carrying the communication satellite ARSAT-1 to orbit. It is the first geostationary satellite built by a Latin American country, Argentina, and the second one of the Americas, after the U.S.
- 30 September 2015 – An Ariane 5 launch vehicle carrying the communication satellite ARSAT-2 to orbit, being the second Argentine geostationary satellite built in two years.
- 1 October 2015 – Sky Muster (NBN-Co 1A) is a communication satellite launched on an Ariane 5 ECA launch vehicle. Sky Muster is the first satellite of an operation to improve Australia's internet with the NBN program.
- 6 October 2016 – Sky Muster II (NBN-Co 1B) is a communication satellite launched on an Ariane 5 ECA launch vehicle. Sky Muster II is the second satellite of an operation to improve Australia's internet with the NBN program.
- 28 January 2017 – A Soyuz-2 STB carrying the geostationary communication satellite Hispasat 36W-1 to orbit. It is the first of the ESA's "Small-GEO" class of satellites.
- 14 February 2017 – An Ariane 5 launch vehicle carrying the commercial communication satellites Sky Brasil 1 (Intelsat 32e) and Telekom 3S launched the satellites to a geostationary orbit.
- 25 January 2018 – Partial failure of Ariane 5 launch vehicle on Ariane flight VA241.
- 19 October 2018 – An Ariane 5 launched the European-Japanese BepiColombo mission to Mercury.
- 5 February 2019 – An Ariane 5 launched the Saudi Geostationary Satellite SGS-1 (also known as SaudiGeosat-1/HellasSat-4).
- 11 July 2019 – Vega failed to launch Falcon Eye 1 satellite for United Arab Emirates Armed Forces.
- 15 August 2020 – An Ariane 5 launched MEV-2, BSAT-4b, and Galaxy-30.
- 17 November 2020 – Vega failed to launch TARANIS and SEOSat-Ingenio.
- 25 December 2021 – An Ariane 5 launched the James Webb Space Telescope.
- 13 December 2022 — An Ariane 5 launched the first third generation Meteosat: Meteosat MTG-I1.
- 21 December 2022 – Vega-C failed to launch two Pléiades Neo satellites from Airbus Defence and Space.
- 14 April 2023 – An Ariane 5 launched the JUICE space probe on an 8-year journey to Jupiter, including four gravity assist maneuvers at the Moon, Earth, and Venus, where it will study three of Jupiter's Galilean moons: Ganymede, Callisto, and Europa.
- 5 July 2023 – Ariane 5 launched two military communication satellites from France and Germany (Syracuse 4B and Heinrich Hertz) as its final mission.
- 9 July 2024 – Ariane 6 launched on its maiden flight.

== Launch pad chart ==
Launch pads at the Guiana Space Centre
Active pad
Inactive tenanted pad
Inactive untenanted pad
1 ELFS
2 ELM
3 ELV
4 ELA-2
5 ELA-3
6 ELA-4
7 ELS

Complex	Status	Tenant	Uses	Coordinates
ELFS (Ensemble de Lancement Fusées-Sondes)	Inactive	Various companies	Sounding rockets	5.208255°N 52.732312°W
ELM (Ensemble de Lancement Multilanceurs)	Inactive	Various companies	Reconfigurable site to be used by: Miura 5, RFA One, Spectrum, Zephyr, SL1, CALLISTO, Themis Retired: Diamant	5.233542°N 52.752582°W
ELV (Ensemble de Lancement Vega)	Active	Avio	Current: Vega C Retired: Europa II, Ariane 1, Ariane 2, Ariane 3, Vega	5.236°N 52.775°W
ELA-2 (Ensemble de Lancement Ariane 2)	Inactive		Retired: Ariane 2, Ariane 3, Ariane 4	5.232°N 52.776°W
ELA-3 (Ensemble de Lancement Ariane 3)	Inactive	Avio	Future: Vega-E Retired: Ariane 5	5.239°N 52.768°W
ELA-4 (Ensemble de Lancement Ariane 4)	Active	Arianespace	Ariane 6	5.26258°N 52.79074°W
ELS (Ensemble de Lancement Soyouz)	Undergoing renovation	MaiaSpace	Future: Maia Retired: Soyuz ST-A, Soyuz ST-B	5.305°N 52.834°W

== Launch statistics ==
As of 18 January 2026

As of 2017, Kourou counts amongst the spaceports with the highest percentage of successful launches, both successive and overall. Here is a chronology of all orbital launches from the Kourou spaceport since 1970, under the French and European space programmes.

=== Flights by launcher ===
Active:
- Ariane 6
- Vega
Retired:
- Diamant
- Europa 2
- Ariane 1
- Ariane 2
- Ariane 3
- Ariane 4
- Ariane 5
- Soyuz ST

=== Flights by mission outcome ===
Success Failure Partial Failure Scheduled

- Charts include all orbital launches from Kourou; sounding rockets are excluded.
- Historical data: launch tables from List of Ariane launches, Soyuz ST, Vega and Encyclopedia Aeronautica.

== Local impact ==
The space sector was responsible for about 15% of French Guiana's GDP in 2014, around half of the 28% it was in 1990. This reduction is mostly due to expansion in other sectors, rather than decreasing space activity. As of 2020, the space sector employed 4,620 people in Guiana, meaning the industry was responsible for just under 10% of salaried jobs in the overseas department, though there are estimates that as many as 9,000 people are employed directly and indirectly as a result of activities at the spaceport. The Guiana Space Centre (or CSG) is one of the spaceports in the world that receives the most traffic, and it receives large amounts of funding from the European Space Agency (ESA), with the organisation covering around 66% of the spaceport's annual budget, as well as financing new facilities. Indigenous and local activist groups argue that mainland France is only interested in French Guiana as far as the space centre is concerned, and the funding that the space centre receives is symbolic given the inequity in living standards seen between the department and mainland France. For example, despite there being high poverty levels and unemployment rates of over 20% in the department, the cost of living remains high due to a dependence on mainland France for imported food and resources, yet large amounts of funding are invested in the space programme, rather than in public services for the department.

The department became the site of strikes and protests throughout March and April 2017, which were held to highlight the insecurity and infrastructural issues facing French Guiana. Alongside 30 labour unions who launched strikes, the Collective of 500 Brothers led protests in Kourou, which spread across the entire country, and resonated in mainland France. On 21 March 2017, the launch of an Ariane 5 rocket carrying a Brazilian satellite and a South Korean satellite was prevented due to protesters and workers on strike from the CSG blockading the centre. Further strikes and occupation of the space centre meant that the satellites were not launched until May 2017. Negotiations between the French government and Guianese protesters resulted in a rejection of a €1.1 billion offer made by the French, with the Guianese demanding at least €3 billion in aid. Since the protests, CNES (National Centre for Space Studies), the French government space agency that operates the spaceport, added an additional €10 million to the €40 million it had already pledged to fund economic and social programmes in French Guiana.

=== Environment ===
Space launches have increased aluminium concentrations around the site.

=== Colonialism ===
Particularly regarding the colonial history the site has been identified as carrying a heritage of colonialism and imperialism into space.

== In popular culture ==
A fictionalized version of the Guiana Space Centre serves as the location of the multiplayer map "Orbital" in the video game Battlefield 2042.

== See also ==
- 3rd Foreign Infantry Regiment
- ESA Centre for Earth Observation (ESRIN)
- European Astronaut Centre (EAC)
- European Centre for Space Applications and Telecommunications (ECSAT)
- European Space Agency (ESA)
- European Space Astronomy Centre (ESAC)
- European Space Operations Centre (ESOC)
- European Space Research and Technology Centre (ESTEC)
- European Space Tracking Network (ESTRACK)
- French space program
- DGA Essais de missiles
