= FD1 (rocket) =

European suborbital rocket demonstrator

- Function: Technology demonstration
- Manufacturer: Avio
- Country of origin: Italy, European Space Agency

Size
- Mass: 6300 kg
- Stages: 1

Associated rockets
- Derivative work: Vega E

Launch history
- Status: Awaiting launch
- Launch sites: Salto di Quirra

First stage
- Engines: 1x MR10

FD1 (Flight Demonstrator #1) is a suborbital rocket demonstrator developed by the Italian company Avio and the European Space Agency (ESA) to test the MR10 methalox engine as well as various reusable rocket-related technologies like grid fins and in-flight engine reignition. The vehicle's integration was completed in September 2026 and it is expected to fly no earlier than 2027. It will be launched from a temporary launchpad at the Salto di Quirra test range on Sardinia. It is expected to reach a maximum altitude of around 70 km and then splash down around 20 km from the launch site and be recovered. The MR10 engine is expected to be used on the future Vega E rocket's upper stage.

== See also ==
- CALLISTO – European-Japanese reusable rocket demonstrator
- Themis – European reusable rocket demonstrator programme
