= Future Launchers Preparatory Programme =

European Space Agency rocket development projects

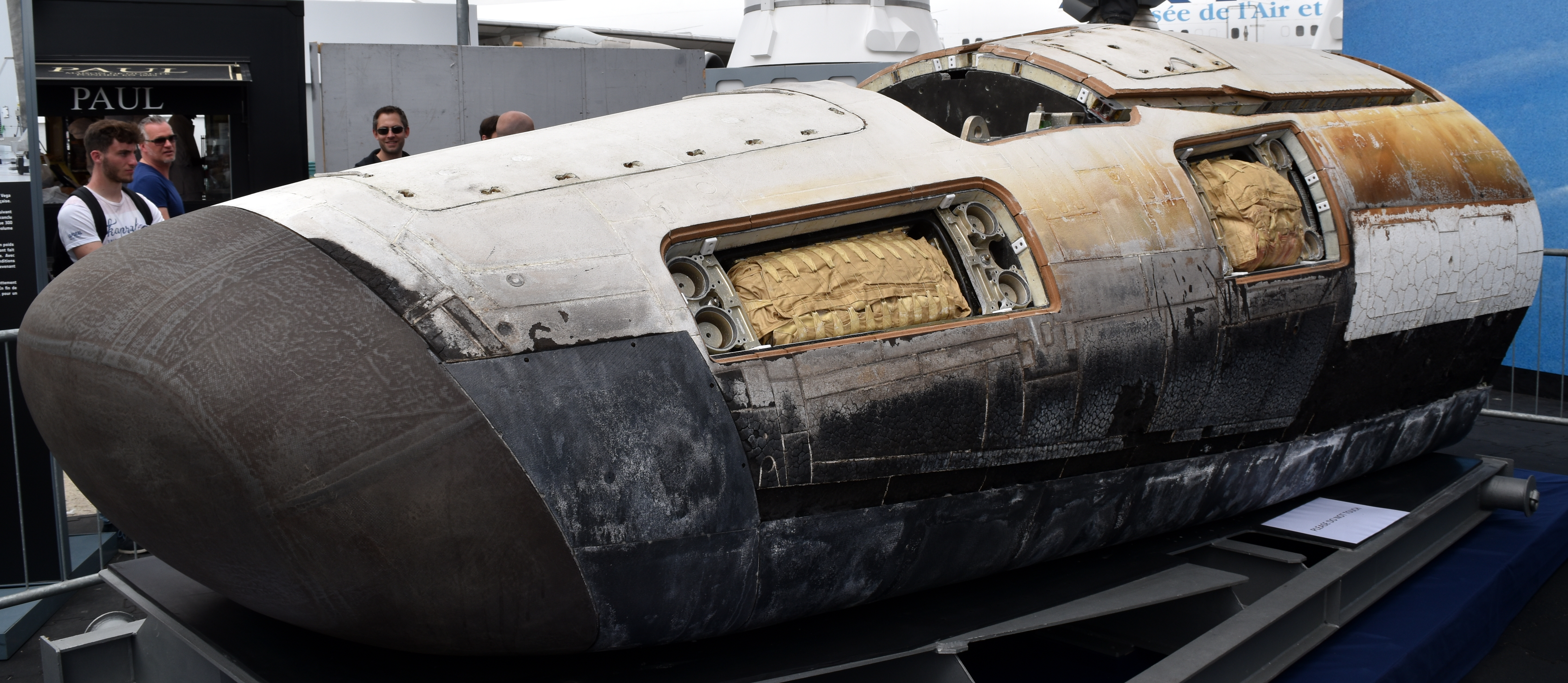
Intermediate eXperimental Vehicle

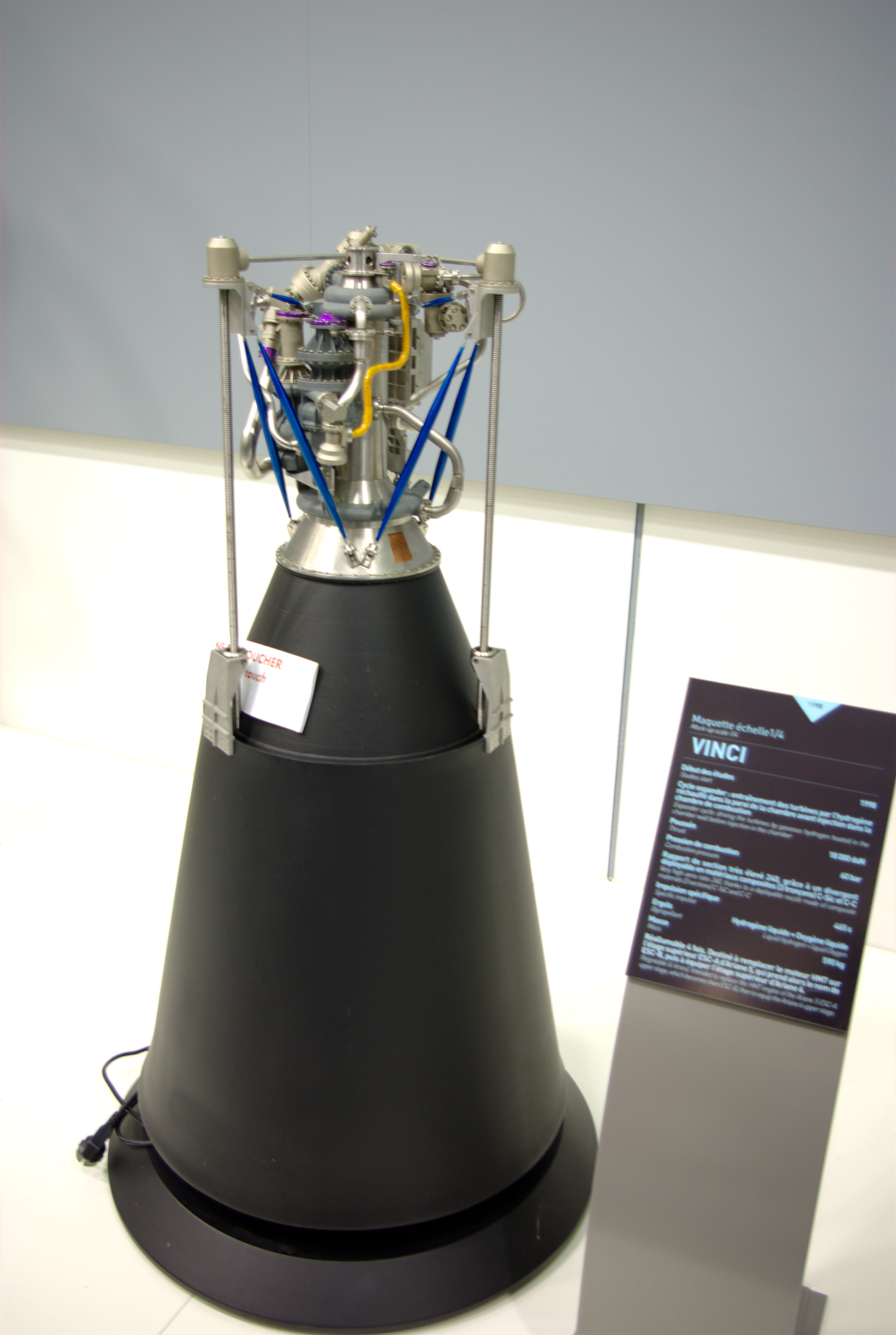
Model of the Vinci rocket engine that powers the upper stage of the Ariane 6 rocket

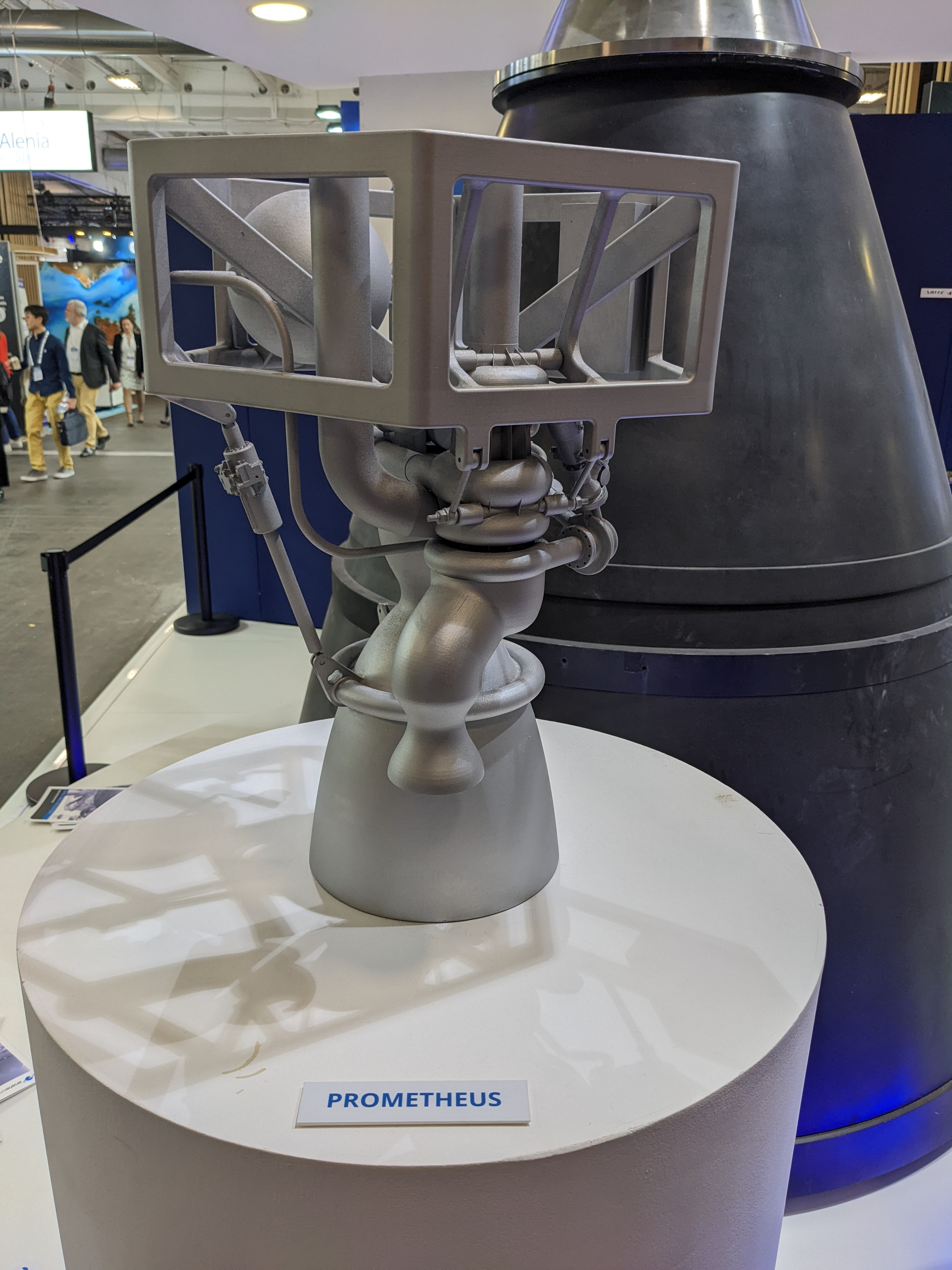
Model of the Prometheus rocket engine, featured at IAC 2022

ESA Future Launchers Preparatory Programme Chart from 2014

The Future Launchers Preparatory Programme (FLPP) is a technology development and maturation programme of the European Space Agency (ESA). It develops technologies for the application in future European launch vehicles and in upgrades to existing launch vehicles. By this it helps to reduce time, risk and cost of launcher development programmes.

Notable projects of FLPP include the IXV re-entry demonstrator that flew to space in 2015, the Vinci rocket engine used on Ariane 6 since 2024, the future uncrewed reusable space plane Space Rider, the Prometheus reusable rocket engine, and the Themis reusable rocket prototype.

== Background ==
Started in 2004, the programmes initial objective was to develop technologies for the Next Generation Launcher (NGL) to follow Ariane 5. With the inception of the Ariane 6 project, the focus of FLPP was shifted to a general development of new technologies for European launchers.

FLPP develops and matures technologies that are deemed promising for future application but currently do not have a sufficiently high technology readiness level (TRL) to allow a clear assessment of their performance and associated risk. Those technologies typically have an initial TRL of 3 or lower. The objective is to raise the TRL up to about 6, thus creating solutions which are proven under relevant conditions and can be integrated into development programmes with reduced cost and limited risk.

FLPP is a development programme within the directorate of launchers at ESA. FLPP is funded by ESA member states on an optional basis. Participating states sign their contribution to FLPP during the ESA ministerial council. Chronologically, FLPP is structured in successive periods, which usually correspond to the time between ministerial councils. To maintain a continuity of work, these periods are overlapping.

== Purpose ==
=== Main objectives ===
The main objectives of FLPP are:

- To identify and prepare the system competence and technology for development with the aim of confining launcher time-to-market within 5 years, reducing recurring cost and development risk, while keeping long-term industry competitiveness.
- To promote reusability of existing and new technologies to reduce development costs globally.
- To perform system studies to assess evolutions of operational launchers, future launcher architectures, advanced concepts, select technology and elaborate technology requirements.
- To safeguard critical European industrial capabilities for the safe exploitation of the current launchers and guaranteed access to space.
- To develop environmentally friendly technologies.

=== Approach ===
FLPP addresses the problem that in many cases, promising new technologies for future launcher applications possess a low TRL. At this stage, an implementation of such a technology into a development programme poses a significant risk. If it turns out, that the technology does not perform as expected in the later stages of the development or the concept using that technology is not feasible, a redesign of the complete system often has severe impacts on time, quality and cost.

FLPP addresses this issue via a system driven approach. Based on system studies for future launch systems or upgrades of current systems, promising technologies, which will provide benefits in line with the objectives of FLPP and have a low TRL (typically 2–3), are selected. These technologies are then developed to reach a TRL high enough (at least 5, typically 6) to allow their implementation into current or future development programmes with largely reduced risks. As technology maturation has already been performed in FLPP, the necessary time span to develop a new launcher is also reduced significantly.

The approach to mature a technology in a demonstrator based on system studies largely reduces the impact of worse than anticipated performance (e.g. in weight, efficiency, complexity) compared to a launcher development, were often a large part of the launcher design is affected by a change in the characteristics of a subsystem. After this "high risk" maturation phase the technology can then be transferred to a launcher development. A major change in the anticipated characteristics of a technology during the course of a development is much less likely when already starting with a high TRL (i.e. TRL 6) as compared to a technology of low readiness.

==== Demonstrators ====
To increase the technology readiness level to 6, a technology has to be tested in a model or prototype in a relevant environment. Performing this in a cost-effective way, one or several technologies are integrated into a demonstrator and tested in a relevant environment, considering such parameters as media, pressures and temperatures.

These demonstrators are based on requirements which are derived from current or future launch systems as well as general experience. The requirements are tailored to be representative of a launch system and provide the possibility to test the maximum attainable performance of the integrated technologies as well as safety margins.

The demonstrators usually represent a sub-system of the complete launcher, e.g. a tank, a stage structure or an engine.

==== Collaboration ====
The projects performed by FLPP rely heavily on the collaboration with external partners. As the increase of TRL which is pursued is linked to the later application of the technology, these partners are usually industrial. If deemed beneficial, institutional partners or subcontractors will be chosen as well.

==== Coordination with other programmes ====
As a technology development programme for future launchers and upgrades to existing launchers, there is a close coordination between FLPP and the launcher development programmes for Ariane and Vega. Many of the technologies matured in FLPP are baselined for the configurations of Ariane 6 and Vega C.

== History ==
=== Inception ===
FLPP was started in February 2004 with the subscription to its declaration by 10 ESA member states.

=== Period 1 (2004-2006) ===
Period 1 was focused on studies for future reusable launch vehicles (RLV). Several different RLV concepts were investigated to select feasible, cost-effective options. In addition, upgrades to reduce the cost of existing launchers were investigated.

=== Period 2 Step 1 (2006-2009) ===
During this period, the work on reusable as well as expendable launch concepts was continued with system studies on several promising launcher configurations. In addition, key technologies for future launchers were integrated into demonstrators to increase their TRL sufficiently for an efficient integration into a launcher development. A major demonstrator project started in this period was the Intermediate eXperimental Vehicle (IXV). In addition, the development of the launcher upper stage engine Vinci was financed and managed by the FLPP programme during this time.

=== Period 2 Step 2 (2009-2013) ===
The second step of period 2 completed the system studies on expendable launchers. The technology development activities, especially on upper stage and re-entry technologies as well as propulsion were continued. While the Vinci engine was transferred to Ariane 5 ME development, a demonstrator project for a high thrust first stage engine called Score-D was started. In addition a demonstrator project for an upper stage engine using storable propellants was created. The later part of this phase saw the inception of a cryogenic expander cycle demonstrator project. Multiple technology development and demonstrator projects were started concerning a wide range of promising technologies. These were in the fields of stage and interstage structures, tanks, avionics as well as hybrid and solid propulsion.

=== Period 3/FLPP NEO (2013-2019) ===
Period 3 was started in 2013 and is overlapping with the FLPP NEO (New Economic Opportunities) period, initiated in 2016. With the inception of a dedicated Ariane 6 project, FLPP broadened its scope from the preparation of technologies for a specific next generation launcher to the general identification and maturation of promising technologies for future launchers as well as upgrades of current launch vehicles. The identification and maturation process of key technologies is still system driven and relies mainly on system studies and integrated demonstrators. An important objective is to foster synergies between different applications and launchers (e.g. Ariane and Vega). FLPP NEO continues the technology approach of the previous periods with emphasis on flagship demonstrators and very low cost launcher concepts.

=== FLPP in 2020s ===
As of 2025, FLPP is structure around seven programmes:

- THRUST! (Technologies for High-thrust Re-Usable Space Transportation) – Propulsion
- FIRST! (Future Innovation Research in Space Transportation) – Technology Disruptors
- InSPoC – In-space transportation proof-of-concepts
- BEST! (Boosters for European Space Transportation) – Reusable boosters and first stages
- Themis – Development of a reusable first stage/rocket
- Phoebus – Optimised upper stage
- Prometheus – Reusable engines

FLPP has introduced a new 2-stage open-competition process that usually spans 12 weeks. In the first stage, ESA publishes a topic-specific call for ideas and selected participants are invited to present their ideas at a public pitch day. The second stage involves submitting a full proposal, evaluation and selection process, and signing a contract with ESA.

== Projects ==
=== FLPP projects in 2010s ===
- The NGL-ELV system studies were performed to identify promising configurations for a Next Generation Launcher to follow Ariane 5 as well as technologies which should be integrated into this launcher, to achieve high reliability, high performance and cost efficiency. If identified technologies did not have a sufficient TRL for efficient integration into a launcher development programme, those could then be matured within FLPP.
- The Staged Combustion Rocket Engine Demonstrator (SCORE-D) was a project to develop key technologies and tools for the High Thrust Engine (HTE) which was planned to power the next generation launcher. As propellant combinations liquid oxygen/hydrogen and liquid oxygen/methane were considered. Several sub-scale tests were performed in the preparation of the demonstrator project. As solid propulsion was initially selected as a baseline for the first stage of Ariane 6, the project was stopped at the stage of an SRR.
- Vinci engine: The development of the re-ignitable cryogenic upper stage engine Vinci was financed and managed by FLPP from 2006 until 2008. Vinci was conceived as the engine for the new upper stage of the Ariane 5, the ESC-B (Etage Supérieur Cryotechnique B/Cryogenic Upper Stage B). It is a re-ignitable expander cycle engine, powered by liquid oxygen and liquid hydrogen. After the failed first flight of its predecessor ESC-A (V-157) in 2002, the development of ESC-B was stopped, but the Vinci development was continued and later transferred to FLPP. In FLPP the technology was matured and extensively tested. In the end of 2008, Vinci was transferred to Ariane 5 ME and after the stop of that programme on to Ariane 6.
- The Intermediate eXperimental Vehicle (IXV) is a re-entry demonstrator to test technologies for reusable launchers and spacecraft. The main focus in this project lies on the thermal protection, as well as flight mechanics and control. It was launched by a Vega rocket in February 2015. The re-entry was controlled via two movable flaps, prior to the deployment of parachutes and a splashdown into the ocean.
- The Expander-cycle Technology Integrated Demonstrator (ETID) is based on an advanced upper stage engine concept partially derived from Vinci technology. It shall incorporate several new technologies to improve the performance of the engine (esp. thrust/weight) and reduce the cost per unit. Some of those technologies could also be beneficial for activities outside of the propulsion sector. As of 2016, the project is in the design and manufacturing phase.
- The Storable Propulsion Technology Demonstrator shall help develop technologies for a rocket engine in the thrust range between 3 and 8 kN. The technology developed in this project could be used in upper stages of small launchers or applications with similar thrust requirements. The demonstrator uses novel cooling, injector and damping technologies. As of 2016, the demonstrator has successfully performed two test campaigns, performing both ground level as well as vacuum ignitions. Steady state behaviour was tested in a large range of operating points and for durations of up to 110s. In addition, combustion stability and thrust chamber length variations were tested.
- Solid propulsion: Current efforts concerning solid propulsion focus on the development of technologies for future motor casings and the investigation of the physics of solid rocket motors, especially pressure oscillations. Both of these goals are pursued via demonstrators. The “Pressure Oscillation Demonstrator eXperimental” (POD-X) is dedicated to the investigation of combustion physics and has already made a test firing, yielding valuable information into solid propulsion combustion processes. The “Fibre Reinforced Optimized Rocket Motor Case” (FORC) is dedicated to the development of the dry fibre winding combined with automated dry fibre placement and subsequent resin infusion technology for the manufacturing of large carbon fibre reinforced polymer solid rocket motor cases, including the production of a full-scale and representative test article featuring an outer diameter of 3.5 meters. As of September 2016, multiple sub-scale specimens have already been produced during the process development for FORC. Furthermore, the test article is in the manufacturing phase, with extensive mechanical load and pressure testing scheduled before the end of the year.
- Hybrid propulsion activities in FLPP are centred around a demonstrator project in collaboration with Nammo. This demonstrator, which has dimensions suitable for later flight applications, has as of September 2016 performed one hot fire test campaign. A second test campaign is on-going, leading to a design which is planned to be flown on a sounding rocket demonstrator.
- The cryogenic tank demonstrator is a series of demonstrators, which shall be used to develop and test technologies for future lightweight cryogenic tank systems. As of September 2016 a sub-scale demonstrator has been manufactured and tested, with a full-scale version currently in the design phase. The demonstrators can also be used as a test platform for other tank equipment and adjacent structure.
- Additive Manufacturing (AM): FLPP is developing additive layer manufacturing technologies - also known as 3D printing - for the application in launch vehicles. These technologies aim to provide faster and cheaper means of small scale production as well as additional design possibilities, leading to lighter more efficient structures. Apart from the application of AM in several other projects, a dedicated project was started to mature the technology and develop applications for future launchers.
- CFRP technologies: There are several projects within FLPP for advanced technologies to produce a wide range of structures out of carbon-fiber-reinforced polymer (CFRP). These structures cover the range from cryogenic feed lines and cryogenic tanks over upper stage structures to interstage structures.
- Fairing technologies: Several future technologies concerning fairings are developed within FLPP. These include a membrane to seal the inside of the fairing from the outside to keep environmental conditions and cleanliness at a desired level and technologies to minimize shock during the separation of the fairing.
- The deorbitation observation capsule will provide detailed data about the disintegration of launcher upper stages during re-entry into the atmosphere. This will help to design future stages for a safe and efficient deorbit manoeuvres. To collect this data, the capsule will be launched on a launcher and after separation of the concerned stage, will observe the behaviour and disintegration of that stage during re-entry.
- Auto-propulsive multi payload adapter system: The scope of this activity is to analyse the needs, verify the feasibility, and provide a preliminary definition of a propulsive orbital module (APMAS), based on an existing multi-payload dispenser system, to enhance the mission and performance envelope of existing launch vehicle upper stages for both, Vega and Ariane 6.
- Secondary payload adapter: The objective of this project is to develop a structural and thermal model for a secondary payload adapter ring for payloads of up to 30 kg. This could help maximise the payload mass for the Vega, Ariane 6 and Soyuz launchers.
- The design for demise (D4D) project investigates the processes that launch vehicle components undergo during re-entry. Special focus lies on the fragmentation behaviour of components like depleted stages, boosters, fairings or payload adapters. The goal is to better understand the behaviour via numeric simulations, the creation of material databases and plasma wind tunnel tests. The findings contribute to a reduced risk of debris impacting on the ground in compliance with ESA debris mitigation requirements.
- Power over Ethernet technology allows mixing of power and signal transmission on the same cable and has the potential to save mass and cost, as well as to decrease operational complexity for launcher telemetry. A project to define a modular launcher telemetry architecture based on this technology is currently on-going. It aims to utilise off-the-shelf components to reduce cost and development time. In the future, the system could be integrated into a larger avionics demonstrator and power other subsystems on the avionic bus.
- The advanced avionics test bed features several innovative technologies such as: harness fault detection, power over Ethernet, optoelectronic telemetry systems and fibre Bragg grating sensor modules that allow the connection of multiple sensors via a single fibre. On ground and in-flight demonstrations are foreseen.

=== FLPP projects in 2020s ===
- The Space Rider is a planned uncrewed orbital spaceplane under development aimed to provide the European Space Agency (ESA) with affordable and routine access to space. Development of Space Rider is being led by the Italian PRIDE programme for ESA, and it inherits technology from the Intermediate eXperimental Vehicle (IXV). It is to launch atop a Vega-C rocket from the French Guiana and land on a runway on Santa Maria Island, in the Azores.
- Prometheus, a reusable methalox rocket engine.
- Themis, a programme to develop a prototype reusable rocket first stage using the Prometheus rocket engine.
- Arcos aerospike engine: Pangea Aerospace, in coordination with ESA, is developing a European aerospike rocket engine. This is the first aerospike in the world that is using liquid methane and liquid oxygen.
- RocketRoll and ALUMNI, initiatives to develop nuclear electric (RocketRoll) and nuclear thermal (ALUMNI) nuclear propulsion systems for space exploration.
- Throttleable Liquid Propulsion Demonstrator (TLPD): Lukasiewicz-ILOT, in coordination with ESA, is developing a rocket engine for use on upper stages of small rockets, on spacecraft, on kick-stages, or on exploration missions.
- TTEthernet switch for the space transportation market and low-earth orbital infrastructure.
- IOSHEX-Space Rider interoperability demonstration mission: SAB Launch Services' IOSHEX orbital vehicle would dock with Space Rider and access the vehicle’s cargo bay using robotic arms.
- Expander-cycle Technology Integrated Demonstrator (ETID), a full-scale integrated demonstrator for an upper-stage rocket engine.
- Bi-Ergoler RaumtransporTAntrieb (BERTA), a 5kN-thrust class, 3D-printed full-scale engine demonstrator for upper stages using classical storable propellant. BERTA will be used on the Ariane Smart Transfer and Release In-orbit Ship (ASTRIS) orbital transfer vehicle
- Greta (previously known as BERTA Green), a 5kN-thrust class, 3D-printed rocket engine using hydrogen peroxide and ethanol as propellants, based on BERTA. Gretas's first hot-fire test campaign was completed in February 2026 at ArianeGroup's Trauen site in Germany.
- Nucleus sounding rocket demonstrating new hybrid propulsion technology
- Demonstrator technology vehicle (DTV) for testing vertical takeoff, short hovering and landing manoeuvres
- Reusable Upper Stage Demonstrator for maturing technologies needed for future reusable upper stages of European rockets
- Throttleable hypergolic engine by the Romanian company ATD Aerospace RS SRL

== See also ==
- European Space Agency (ESA)
- PLD Space
- Ariane 6
- Ariane Next
- IXV
- Vinci (rocket engine)
- Prometheus (rocket engine)
- Themis programme
- List of European Space Agency programmes and missions
