= ArianeGroup =

European aerospace company

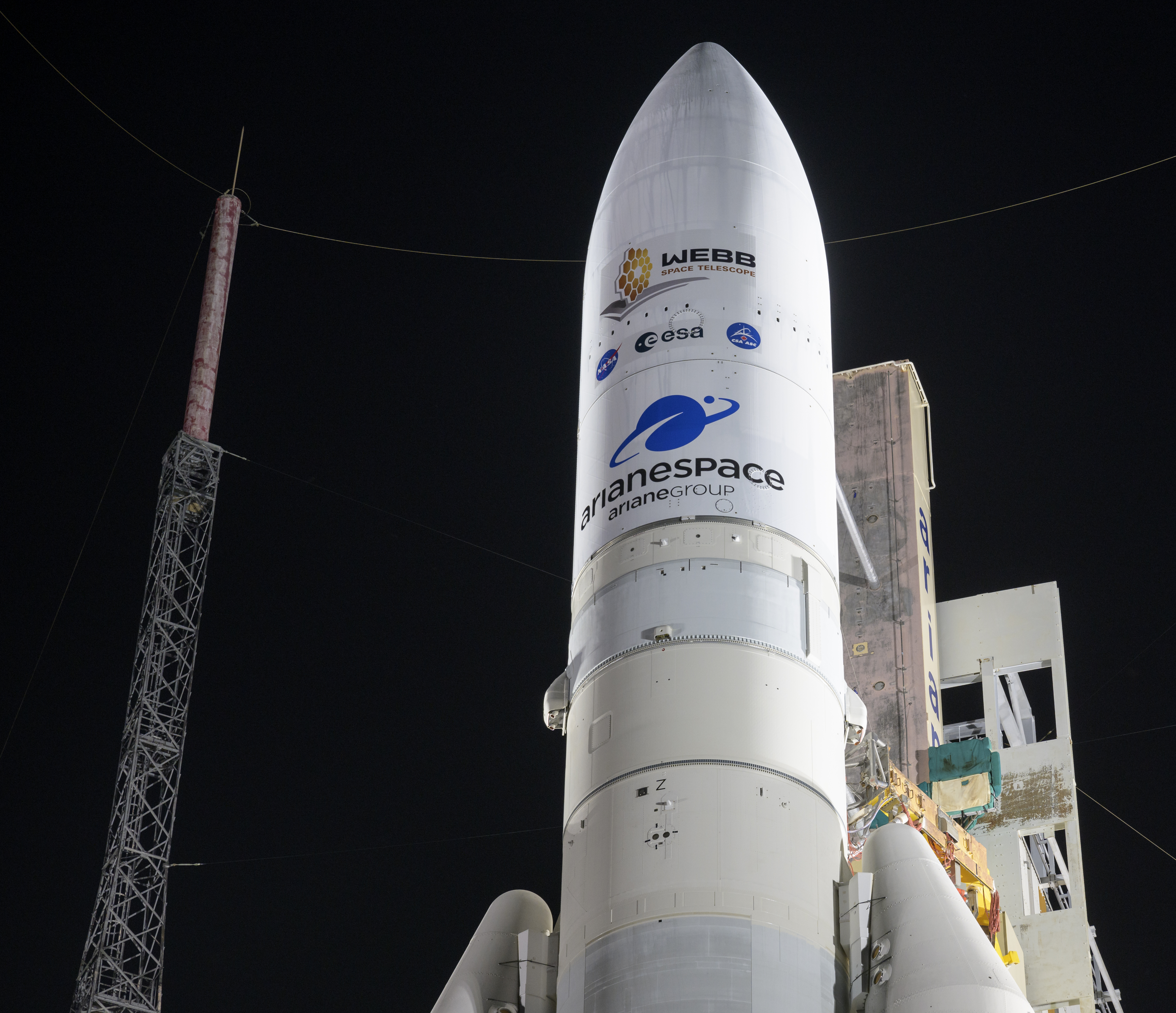
- Ariane 5 carrying NASA's James Webb Space Telescope in December 2021 in Kourou, French Guiana, France.
- Formerly: Airbus Safran Launchers
- Type: Joint venture
- Industry: Space
- Founded: 1 January 2015; 11 years ago
- Headquarters: Paris, France
- Key people: Martin Sion (CEO, until March 2026)
- Revenue: €3.1 billion (2021)
- Owners: Airbus (50%); Safran (50%)
- Number of employees: 8,000 (2023)
- Subsidiaries: Arianespace; CILAS; Eurockot Launch Services; MaiaSpace; Sodern
- Website: www.ariane.group

ArianeGroup (formerly Airbus Safran Launchers) is an aerospace company based in France. A joint venture between Airbus and Safran, the company was founded in 2015 and is headquartered in Issy-les-Moulineaux near Paris. It consists of three core groups: aerospace, defence, and security. ArianeGroup has developed its next-generation two-stage Ariane 6 launch vehicle, which succeeded the Ariane 5 rocket, that had more than 110 launches. The new vehicle offers two variants that are capable of carrying between 10,350 and 21,650 kilograms. The first launch of Ariane 6 occurred on 9 July 2024.

If the company's task is to develop and manufacture the launch vehicles, Arianespace acts as the launch service provider for them. Meanwhile, another subsidiary, ArianeWorks, is tasked with developing next-generation technologies such as the reusable Themis rocket booster. ArianeGroup also notably manufactures France's M51 nuclear submarine-launched ballistic missile.

As of 2016, ArianeGroup's principal sites are located in Issy-les-Moulineaux, Saint-Médard-en-Jalles, Kourou (space center), Vernon, Le Haillan and Les Mureaux in France as well as Lampoldshausen, Bremen and Ottobrunn in Germany.

== History ==
The formation of ArianeGroup is closely connected to both the development of the Ariane 6 heavy-lift launcher during the 2010s, as well as the space manufacturing aligned interests of two European aerospace companies, Airbus and Safran. During June 2014, Airbus and Safran approached the European Space Agency (ESA) with its own proposal for the Ariane 6 programme, the establishment of a 50/50 joint venture to develop the rocket, which would also involve buying out the French government's CNES interest in Arianespace.

The company was established on 1 January 2015, with headquarters in Issy-les-Moulineaux near Paris. At the time of formation, ArianeGroup's principal sites were Issy-les-Moulineaux, Saint-Médard-en-Jalles, Kourou (space center), Vernon, Le Haillan and Les Mureaux in France as well as Lampoldshausen, Bremen and Ottobrunn in Germany. In mid 2014, the joint venture partners named Alain Charmeau as its CEO and Marc Ventre as the Chairman of the Board.

The reorganization of a major portion of Europe's space industry, which led to the creation of ArianeGroup, generated both close scrutiny and a level of controversy. French newspaper La Tribune published a scathing article, questioning whether Airbus could deliver on the promised costs for their Ariane 6 proposal, and whether Airbus and Safran Group could be trusted when they were found to be responsible for a failure of Ariane 5 flight 517 in 2002 and the failure of the M51 ballistic missile in 2013. The companies were also criticized for being unwilling to incur development risks, and asking for higher initial funding than originally planned - €2.6 billion instead of €2.3 billion. Estimated launch prices of €85 million for Ariane 6.1 and €69 million for Ariane 6.2 did not compare favorably to SpaceX offerings. A review was performed by the French government, focusing upon the company's tax affairs, while the European Commission conducted its own probe into a possible conflict of interest if Airbus, which is also active as a satellite manufacturer, was put into the position of purchasing launches upon launchers manufactured by itself.

As of 2018, Alain Charmeau remained as chair of ArianeGroup, and the group was producing three existing rockets: the Ariane 5, Vega, and a European version of the Russian Soyuz, while pursuing development of the Ariane 6, and building a massive new launch pad facility at the Guiana Space Centre.

By February 2019, Ariane Group and the French government space agency CNES began work on a new "acceleration platform" called ArianeWorks to develop new launchers, including reusable ones, which included teams from both companies working "under one roof." The joint operation was to have a more flexible working environment than traditional Ariane projects, and was intended to explicitly be open to "new players and internationally." By September 2019, the results from two low-cost demonstrators were expected soon, and a more robust flight demonstrator called Themis was projected to one day make use of some parts of the earlier demonstration projects and would use the larger reusable Prometheus rocket engine. The Themis prototype was to be built by Paris prototyping company MyCTO. In the event, the ESA contracted with ArianeGroup in December 2020 to build the Themis resusable rocket stage demonstrator, and provided an initial €33 million for the first development phase. The program objective is to be able to demonstrate to European governments by 2022 a range of technologies needed to meet European reusable rocket technology needs such that competitive launcher options could be developed in Europe to compete in the 2030s global launch market.

== Products ==
=== Orbital launch vehicles ===
Ariane 62 (left) and Ariane 64 (right) in development by ArianeGroup

ArianeGroup's subsidiary, Arianespace, operates and markets commercial launch services for the Ariane rocket family, an expendable launch system which is used to deliver payloads into geostationary transfer orbit (GTO) or low Earth orbit (LEO). According to Arianespace, at the time of its establishment in 1980, it was the world's first launch services company. By early 1986, the Ariane 1, along with its Ariane 2 and Ariane 3 derivates, had become the dominant launcher on the global market. Since then, the improved Ariane 4, Ariane 5 and Ariane 6 launchers have been successfully introduced by Arianespace.

In addition to the Ariane heavy-lift launcher, Arianespace also has a portfolio of smaller launch vehicles, including the Soyuz-2 as a medium-lift alternative, and the solid-fueled Vega for lighter payloads. Arianespace uses the Guiana Space Center in French Guiana as its main launch site.

While Arianespace handled the operation of the Ariane 5, its parent ArianeGroup is the primary contractor for the manufacture of this launcher. It has also been responsible for enhancements and further development of the platform; one project, known as the Ariane 5 ME (Mid-life Evolution) was underway until late 2014, at which point the ESA halted funding for development to instead prioritize work on the new generation Ariane 6 launcher.

On 12 August 2015, the European Space Agency (ESA) appointed Airbus Safran Launchers as the principal contractor with the new development of the Ariane 6. Amongst other factors, the ESA is reportedly keen to maximise the potential commonalities between the Ariane 6 and Vega launchers. During January 2016, the basic design was finalized, advancing the work into the detailed design and production phases. On 6 May 2019, Arianespace ordered the first production batch of 14 Ariane 6 launchers; these are intended for missions to be conducted between 2022 and 2025. Ariane 6 first launched on 9 July 2024.

ArianeGroup is also developing Ariane Next, a partially reusable launcher that should succeed Ariane 6 from the 2030s. The objective of this reusable launcher is to halve the launch costs.

==== MaiaSpace ====
In 2021, French company, MaiaSpace, was founded. A subsidiary of ArianeGroup, its purpose is to develop a small reusable launch vehicle as soon as 2026. The launch vehicle, named Maia, is planned to be capable of carrying 500-kilogram payloads to Sun-synchronous orbit. It will use the Prometheus engine—three for the first stage and one for the upper stage. The rocket design is similar to SpaceX's reusable rocket, Falcon 9, and similarly to SpaceX, Maia will use landing legs to land on either a floating landing platform or a landing pad on land. The Maia rocket will be launched from Europe's Guiana Spaceport in Kourou, French Guiana.

=== Missiles ===
ArianeGroup is the prime contractor for the M51, a submarine-launched ballistic missile (SLBM) operated by the French Navy, being responsible for development, manufacture, system support, and end-of-life disposal of the missiles, in addition to delivering both the land-based operating infrastructure and the submarine-based command and control systems. During May 2016, Airbus and Safran announced an agreement for ArianeGroup to undertake modification work to upgrade the M51 to the M51.3 standard.

During January 2019, it was announced that ArianeGroup was developing a hypersonic glide vehicle under the project V-Max. Forecast for delivery during 2021, its delivery shall make France the first European nation to develop its own hypersonic weapons.

Single-stage rocket SyLEx (from 2021; first successful launch — november 2024).

=== Orbital Propulsion Systems ===
The Orbital Propulsion Centre, a division of the ArianeGroup, is located in Lampoldshausen, Germany. The Lampoldshausen facility is the European centre of excellence for spacecraft propulsion. The centre supplies complete propulsion systems, subsystems and component parts for satellites, orbital spacecraft, interplanetary spacecraft, re-entry vehicles, resupply missions to the International Space Station and currently the NASA / ESA Orion European Service Module. The majority of ESA satellites and spacecraft have reportedly incorporated thruster or other components that have been produced at Lampoldshausen.

=== Rocket engines ===
- Vulcain
- HM7B
- Vinci

== See also ==
- French space program
