= Prometheus (rocket engine) =

Methalox spacecraft propulsion system

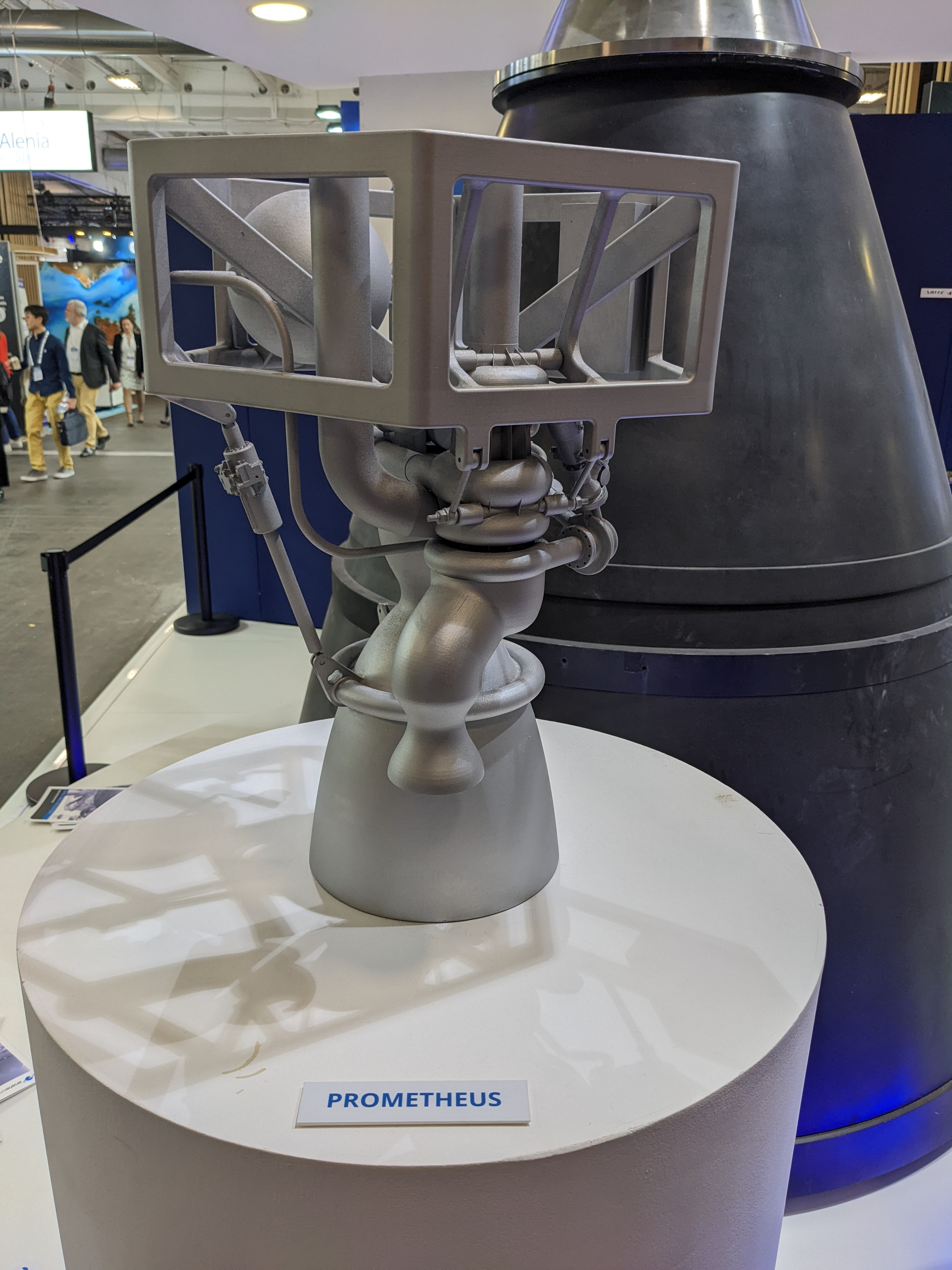
- Model of the Prometheus rocket engine, featured at IAC 2022.
- Country of origin: France; European Union
- Designer: ArianeGroup
- Manufacturer: Ariane Group
- Associated LV: Themis · Ariane Next · Maia

Liquid-fuel engine
- Propellant: LOX / CH_{4}
- Cycle: Gas-generator

Performance
- Thrust, sea-level: 980 kN (220,000 lb_{f})
- Throttle range: 30% to 110%
- Chamber pressure: 100 bar (10,000 kPa)
- Specific impulse, vacuum: 360 s

The Prometheus rocket engine is an ongoing European Space Agency (ESA) development effort begun in 2017 to create a reusable methane-fueled rocket engine for use on the Themis reusable rocket demonstrator, Ariane Next, the successor to Ariane 6, possibly a version of Ariane 6 itself, and the Maia reusable launch vehicle.

Prometheus is a backronym from the original French project designation PROMETHEE, standing for "Precursor Reusable Oxygen Methane cost Effective propulsion System", and for the Titan Prometheus, from Greek mythology, creator of humanity, and god of fire, known for giving fire to humanity in defiance of the gods.

The engine is aimed to be reusable with substantially lower costs than traditional engines manufactured in Europe. The cost goal is to manufacture the Prometheus engine at one-tenth the cost of Vulcain 2, Ariane 5's first-stage engine.

By 2020, the program was funded and is under development by ArianeGroup. By 2025, the engine had completed two successful test firing campaigns including four successive ignitions in a single day.

== General characteristics ==
The engine is planned to have the following features:

- Methane–oxygen propellant.
- Extensive use of metal 3D printing (up to 50% of the engine).
- Open gas-generator cycle.
- 980 kN of thrust (~100 tonnes), variable from 30% to 110% thrust.
- 100 bar (10,000 kPa) chamber pressure.
- 360 s specific impulse (I_{sp}).
- Reusable 5 times.
- Around 1 million euros production cost.

== History ==
The European Space Agency (ESA) began funding Prometheus engine development in June 2017 with €85 million provided through the Future Launchers Preparatory Programme, 63% of which came from France.

By June 2017, Patrick Bonguet, lead of the Ariane 6 launch vehicle program at Arianespace, indicated that it was possible the Prometheus engine could find a use on a future version of the expendable Ariane 6 launcher. In this scenario, a "streamlined version of the Vulcain rocket engine called Vulcain 2.1 would have the same performance as Vulcain 2". The expendable Ariane 6 was then expected to make an initial launch in 2020.

By June 2020, the ESA was on board with this plan and had agreed to completely fund the development of the Prometheus precursor engine to bring the "engine design to a technical maturity suitable for industry". The objective of the overall program as stated in June 2020 was to utilize Prometheus technology to eventually "lower the cost of production by a factor of ten of the current main stage Ariane 5 Vulcain 2 engine". In 2021, ESA invested an additional €135 million in the project, including €30 million from DLR.

The engine was started up in Nov 2022. It had a successful 12 second test firing in June 2023, at the THEMIS test stand in Vernon, France. An additional successful hot fire test was reported at the end of 2024. The second test campaign for Prometheus in Vernon finished in June 2025 after a second model of the engine performed a series of repeated hot-firing tests under various thrust profiles. On 20 June 2025, the engine successfully demonstrated 4 consecutive ignitions, a first in Europe for this type of engine. In November 2026 another round of test fires took place at the now upgraded DLR's Lampoldshausen test site. These demonstrated new manufacturing capabilities and a revised ignition system relying solely on engine inlet pressures.

== See also ==
- Future Launchers Preparatory Programme – European Space Agency rocket development projects
- CALLISTO – European-Japanese reusable rocket demonstrator
- Themis programme – European reusable rocket demonstrator programme
- Ariane Next – Orbital recoverable launch vehicle of the European company ArianeGroup
