= Throttleable Liquid Propulsion Demonstrator =

Throttleable Liquid Propulsion Demonstrator (TLPD) is a prototype liquid-propellant rocket engine under development by the Polish Lukasiewicz Research Network - Institute of Aviation (Lukasiewicz-ILOT) for ESA. It uses storable propellant: hydrogen peroxide and ethanol and a 3D-printed combustion chamber. The engine has a nominal thrust of 5 kN, and using a pintle injector, the thrust can be varied between 20% and 110%. TLPD is part of ESA's Future Launchers Preparatory Programme (FLPP). Test firings were performed in 2024 and 2025. The 2025 test campaign added water cooling to the engine's combustion chamber, allowing for longer tests of up to a minute at a time.
