= Themis programme =

European reusable rocket demonstrator programme

Themis
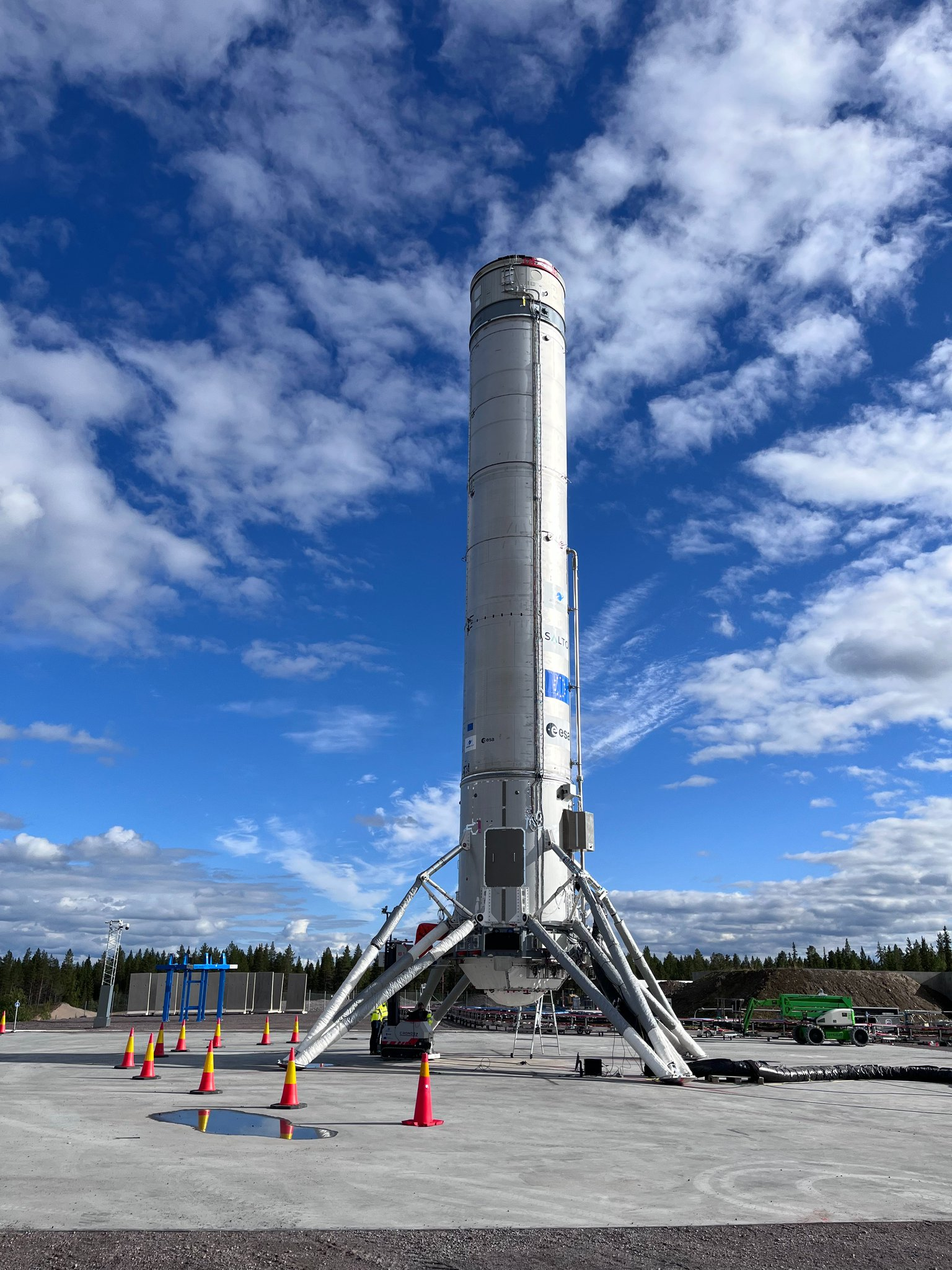
- Function: Technology demonstration
- Manufacturer: ArianeGroup
- Country of origin: European Union; European Space Agency

Size
- Height: 30 m
- Diameter: 3.5 m
- Mass: 200 t
- Stages: 1

Associated rockets
- Derivative work: Maia, Ariane Next
- Comparable: Grasshopper

Launch history
- Status: Awaiting first flight
- First flight: NET June 2027 (planned)

First stage
- Engines: 1x Prometheus

The Themis programme is an ongoing European Space Agency (ESA) programme carried by prime contractor ArianeGroup, aiming to develop a prototype reusable rocket first stage and plans to conduct demonstration flights. The prototype rockets will also be called Themis. As of 2025, two prototypes were being developed: Themis 1-Engine Hop (T1H) and Themis 1-Engine Evolution (T1E). Later, a three-engine variant (T3) may be built. First flight test of the first vehicle (T1H) are expected to take place at Esrange in summer of 2027. The initial test flights are funded through the European Union's reuSable strAtegic space Launcher Technologies & Operations (SALTO) initiative.

Themis is expected to provide valuable information on the economic value of reusability for the European government space program and develop technologies for potential use on future European launch vehicles. Themis will be powered by the ESA's Prometheus rocket engine. Eventually, lessons learned with Themis's development will pave the way for developing the European reusable launchers Maia and Ariane Next. Themis is distinct from a similar project CALLISTO under development by CNES, DLR, and JAXA.

== Project history ==
On 15 December 2020, ESA signed a contract worth €33 million with ArianeGroup in France for the "Themis Initial Phase". This first phase of the Themis programme involves development of the flight vehicle technologies and test bench and static fire demonstrations in Vernon, France. It also includes the preparation of the ground infrastructure at the Esrange Space Center in Kiruna, Sweden, for the first hop tests and any associated flight vehicle modifications.

Two possible landing sites have been mentioned in discussions surrounding the project: the former Diamant launch complex, which will be used for the flight testing phase and the Ariane 5 launch complex, which will become available after the transition from the Ariane 5 to Ariane 6.

The estimated program timeline, as of December 2020, expected low-altitude hop tests in 2022 and a full flight envelope test in 2025. In November 2024, ESA awarded a contract to ArianeGroup to build a second Themis demonstrator (T1E) and announced that testing of the Themis main systems has been completed and the assembly of the first demonstrator was underway.

=== Themis T1H ===
Themis T1H compared to other European and Japanese reusable rocket demonstrators including FD1 and Callisto

In December 2021, ESA completed a series of tanking tests on the steel propellant tanks for Themis. On 22 June 2023, the first hot-fire test of the Prometheus engine, as a part of the Themis first stage demonstrator, was successfully conducted in Vernon, France. Landing leg testing began in July 2024. ArianeGroup brought the main elements of Themis T1H together for the first time during a full-fit check in Les Mureaux, France in December 2024.

Themis T1H integration was completed at Les Mureaux in June 2025. The vehicle was packed and prepared for shipment and on 27 June 2025, it arrived at the Esrange spaceport in Sweden. In September 2025, Themis T1H had its four landing legs installed and ESA shared a photo of the vehicle standing at its launch pad at Esrange.

On 23 July 2026, ArianeGroup performed a wet dress rehearsal—a simulated pre-flight sequence under cryogenic conditions—of Themis T1H at Esrange. A second wet dress rehearsal was performed on 29 September 2026. Both tests used liquid nitrogen instead of the propellant. The first flight was expected before the end of 2026, however, on 23 October the ESA's Director of Space Transportation, Géraldine Naja, stated that it was uncertain that Themis would launch before 2027, with the ESA now targeting June 2027 hop tests.

== See also ==
- List of European Space Agency programmes and missions
- Future Launchers Preparatory Programme – European Space Agency rocket development projects
- CALLISTO – European-Japanese reusable rocket demonstrator
- FD1 – European suborbital rocket demonstrator
- Prometheus – Methalox spacecraft propulsion system
- Maia – European orbital reusable rocket
- Ariane Next – Orbital recoverable launch vehicle of the European company ArianeGroup
- Miura 5 – European orbital recoverable rocket of the company PLD Space
- Miura Next – European orbital recoverable rocket of the company PLD Space
