= Maia (rocket) =

European orbital reusable rocket

- Function: Partially reusable small-lift launch vehicle
- Manufacturer: MaiaSpace (ArianeGroup)
- Country of origin: France

Size
- Height: 50 m (160 ft)
- Diameter: 3.5 m (11 ft)
- Stages: 2 (plus optional 3rd)

Capacity

Payload to LEO
- Mass: 500 kg (1,100 lb) when reusable; 1,500 kg (3,300 lb) when expendable; 2,500 kg (5,500 lb) with 3rd stage and fully expendable

Payload to SSO
- Mass: 500 kg (1,100 lb) when reusable; 1,500 kg (3,300 lb) when expendable; 2,500 kg (5,500 lb) with 3rd stage and fully expendable

Associated rockets
- Based on: Themis
- Comparable: Miura 5, Firefly Alpha

Launch history
- Status: In development
- Launch sites: Guiana, ELS
- First flight: 2027 (planned)

First stage
- Powered by: 3 × Prometheus
- Propellant: Methane/LOX

Second stage
- Powered by: 1 × Prometheus
- Propellant: Methane/LOX

Optional third stage – Colibri
- Powered by: multiple engines developed by Łukasiewicz–ILOT

Maia is an orbital reusable launch vehicle currently under development by the French company MaiaSpace, a wholly-owned subsidiary of ArianeGroup, with the support of the European Space Agency (ESA). A two-stage rocket, it will consist of a first stage with three Prometheus engines as well as a re-ignitable second stage with a single Prometheus engine. An optional Colibri kick stage could be added, powered by a cluster of engines developed by the Polish institute Łukasiewicz – ILOT.

Maia will deliver up to 500 kg to low Earth orbit (LEO) when the first stage is recovered and 1,500 kg when fully expendable. The addition of Colibri will give the rocket a performance boost of at least 1,000 kg to LEO for each version. The reusable first stage will be equipped with landing legs, grid fins, and an attitude control system for controlled landing on a barge at sea. The inaugural orbital flight of Maia is expected in 2027.

== Background ==
The development of Maia is supported by ESA's European Launcher Challenge. The reusable Prometheus engine, which will power Maia's first and second stages, was developed using funding from the ESA's Future Launchers Preparatory Programme (FLPP). The Colibri's engines will be based on technology developed by Łukasiewicz–ILOT as part of its GRACE 1 & 2 projects, also funded through FLPP. The first stage of Maia will utilize a number of technologies developed for ESA's Themis reusable rocket demonstrator, again funded through FLPP. Reusability of the first stage will be further developed within the project SkyHopper, which receives funding from CNES. Maia will be launching from the ELS launchpad at the Guiana Space Centre formerly used by Soyuz at CSG and abandoned after the Russian invasion of Ukraine in 2022.

== History ==
=== Development ===
The first cryogenic test of a full-scale prototype of the Maia's second stage has been completed in September 2023. In August 2025, MaiaSpace has completed a six-month test campaign of high-pressure burst tests on subscale prototypes of Maia's propellant tanks. In September 2025, MaiaSpace successfully tested firing of two Colibri kick stage engines simultaneously.

The company originally planned to conduct a suborbital test launch of the entire rocket, but in July 2026, it cancelled this plan in favor of an orbital flight planned for the second half of 2027.

In July 2026, MaiaSpace completed another test campaign for the Colibri third stage, which included simultaneous ignition of all four engines.

MaiaSpace was one of four companies to receive ESA funding under the 27 August 2026, European Launcher Challenge to develop Maia alongside PLD Space, Isar Aerospace, and Rocket Factory Augsburg. However, MaiaSpace was the only company to choose to be paid in terms of launch contracts, as opposed to technical development, meaning instead of receiving funding for reaching development milestones MaiaSpace will only receive additional funding when the rocket is operational.

=== Launch contracts ===
MaiaSpace has secured its first commercial customer in March 2025, when they signed a multi-launch agreement with the French company Exotrail to carry its Spacevan orbital transfer vehicle to LEO starting not earlier than 2027.

In January 2026, MaiaSpace secured a multi-launch contract with Eutelsat to launch satellites for its OneWeb constellation to low Earth orbit.

On 18 November 2026, MaiaSpace signed an agreement with the Luxembourg-based Space Cargo Unlimited to launch the company's in-space manufacturing spacecraft BentoBox on Maia's first commercial mission. That flight was expected to take place in 2028.

== Launches ==
=== Upcoming launches ===
Flight No.	Date and time (UTC)	Launch site	Payload	Planned orbit	Customer	Status
1	NET 2027	Guiana Space Centre	TBA	TBA	TBA	Planned
1	First launch.					
2	NET 2028	Guiana Space Centre	(Luxembourg) BentoBox	TBA	Space Cargo Unlimited	Planned
2	First commercial launch.					
