= Adeline (rocket stage) =

Proposed reusable first stage for Ariane 6, abandoned by 2018

Adeline with deployed propellers, next to Ariane 6 main stage

Adeline (Advanced Expendable Launcher with Innovative engine Economy) was a concept for a reusable rocket first-stage that would fly itself back to Earth after a launch using drone technology for horizontal landing on a runway. Airbus Defence and Space conceived the design concept. Airbus started this program in 2010 and has invested about €15 million by May 2015 on the reusable technology programme; scale models have been flown. In 2018 an official in the CNES launcher directorate declared the concept "not financially interesting".

== Overview ==
The concept envisions a rocket booster that includes propeller engines and avionics to allow for its recovery by a soft landing on a runway. The boosters would then be refurbished and reused on another flight. After the stage is exhausted during launch, the engine module is jettisoned for reentry. At a certain point in the descent, Adeline would deploy its small winglets and steer itself towards a runway whilst gliding. As it approaches the runway, landing gear and two small pusher configuration propellers would be deployed to perform a powered horizontal landing. The concept would allow for reusing 80% of the stage's economic value: the engine, avionics and propulsion bay. The engines could be re-flown about 10 to 20 times.

The approach could have several advantages over the successfully proven SpaceX technology which regularly returns its first stage rockets. Specifically, it avoids the high stresses their booster engines experience during deceleration for a vertical landing and for a geostationary flight it would only require around 2,000 kg of fuel to return safely to the ground against an estimated 35,000 kg that Airbus has estimated are needed to return a SpaceX booster to the launch site. Fuel is only a minor cost in the value of the overall launch, however to achieve a 21-40% reduction in cost of the launch the Falcon 9 payload is reduced from 8,300kg to 5,500kg pushing cost per kilogram back up by a third and negating much of the savings, the true cost advantage would be when carrying customer payloads significantly below the rockets lift potential where the otherwise unused lift capacity could be used for extra fuel to recycle the rocket. The concept was proposed to be used in future evolution of Ariane 6, or any liquid-fuel rocket. The project engineers think it could recover 20-30% of the cost of a flight at an added weight penalty cost of about 10%.

== See also ==
- Ariane (rocket family)
- Comparison of orbital launchers families
- Liquid fly-back booster, a cancelled DLR project to develop reusable boosters for Ariane 5
- Reusable launch system
- Winged Reusable Sounding rocket (WIRES)
- RETALT, reusable launch systems
- SUSIE, another concept for introducing reusability to the Ariane 6
