= Ariane (rocket family) =

Family of European medium- and heavy-lift rocket launch vehicles

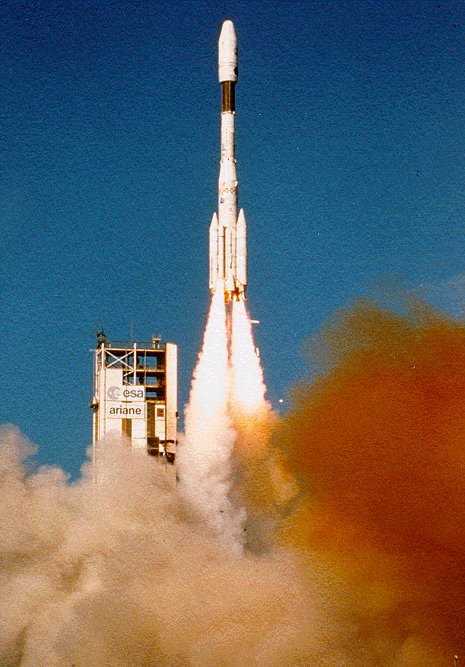
The first ever Ariane 4 launch from Kourou on June 14, 1988

Ariane (French: [aʁjan]) is a series of European civilian expendable launch vehicles for space launch use. The name comes from the French spelling of the mythological character Ariadne. France first proposed the Ariane project and it was officially agreed upon at the end of 1973 after discussions between France, Germany and the UK. The project was Western Europe's second attempt at developing its own launcher following the unsuccessful Europa project. The Ariane project was code-named L3S (the French abbreviation for third-generation substitution launcher).

The European Space Agency (ESA) charged Aérospatiale (whose former assets now form Airbus) with the development of all Ariane launchers and of the testing facilities, while Arianespace handled production, operations and marketing after its creation in 1980. Arianespace launches Ariane rockets from the Guiana Space Centre at Kourou in French Guiana. As a result of the merger in 2000 that founded Airbus, the new corporation's space branch and subsequently its subsidiary with Safran, ArianeGroup, took over the duties of the defunct Aérospatiale.

== Ariane versions ==
Ariane 1
Ariane 2
Ariane 3
Ariane 4
Ariane 5
Ariane 6
│
1975
│
1980
│
1985
│
1990
│
1995
│
2000
│
2005
│
2010
│
2015
│
2020
│
2025

Version	Launches: successes / total	Variants	Payload to GTO	Payload to LEO	Height	Mass	Stages
Ariane 1	9 / 11	—N/a	1,850 kg (4,080 lb)	—N/a	47.46 m (155.7 ft)	211.5 t (466,000 lb)	3
Ariane 2	5 / 6	—N/a	2,180 kg (4,810 lb)	—N/a	49.13 m (161.2 ft)	221 t (487,000 lb)	3
Ariane 3	10 / 11	—N/a	2,700 kg (6,000 lb)	—N/a	49.13 m (161.2 ft)	234 t (516,000 lb)	3
Ariane 4	113 / 116	40, 42P, 42L, 44P, 44LP, 44L	2,000–4,300 kg (4,400–9,500 lb)	5,000–7,600 kg (11,000–16,800 lb)	58.72 m (192.7 ft)	240–470 t (530,000–1,040,000 lb)	3
Ariane 5	112 / 117	G, G+, GS, ECA	6,950–10,500 kg (15,320–23,150 lb)	16,000–21,000 kg (35,000–46,000 lb)	46–52 m (151–171 ft)	720–780 t (1,590,000–1,720,000 lb)	2
Ariane 6	8 / 9	62, 64, 64 Block 2	5,000–10,500 kg (11,000–23,100 lb)	7,000–22,000 kg (15,000–49,000 lb)	63 m (207 ft)	500–900 t (1,100,000–2,000,000 lb)	2

Evolution of the Ariane rocket family

Ariane 1 was a three-stage launcher, derived from ballistic missile technology. The first two stages used hypergolic propellants and the third stage used cryogenic liquid hydrogen and liquid oxygen (LH2/LOX). Ariane 2–4 were enhancements of the basic vehicle. The major differences are improved versions of the engines, allowing stretched first- and third-stage tanks and greater payloads. The largest versions can launch two satellites, mounted in the SPELDA (Structure Porteuse Externe pour Lancements Doubles Ariane) adapter.

Such later versions are often seen with strap-on boosters. These layouts are designated by suffixes after the generation number. First is the total number of boosters, then letters designating liquid- or solid-fuelled stages. For example, an Ariane 42P is an Ariane 4 with two solid-fuel boosters. An Ariane 44LP has two solid, two liquid boosters, and a 44L has four liquid-fuel boosters.

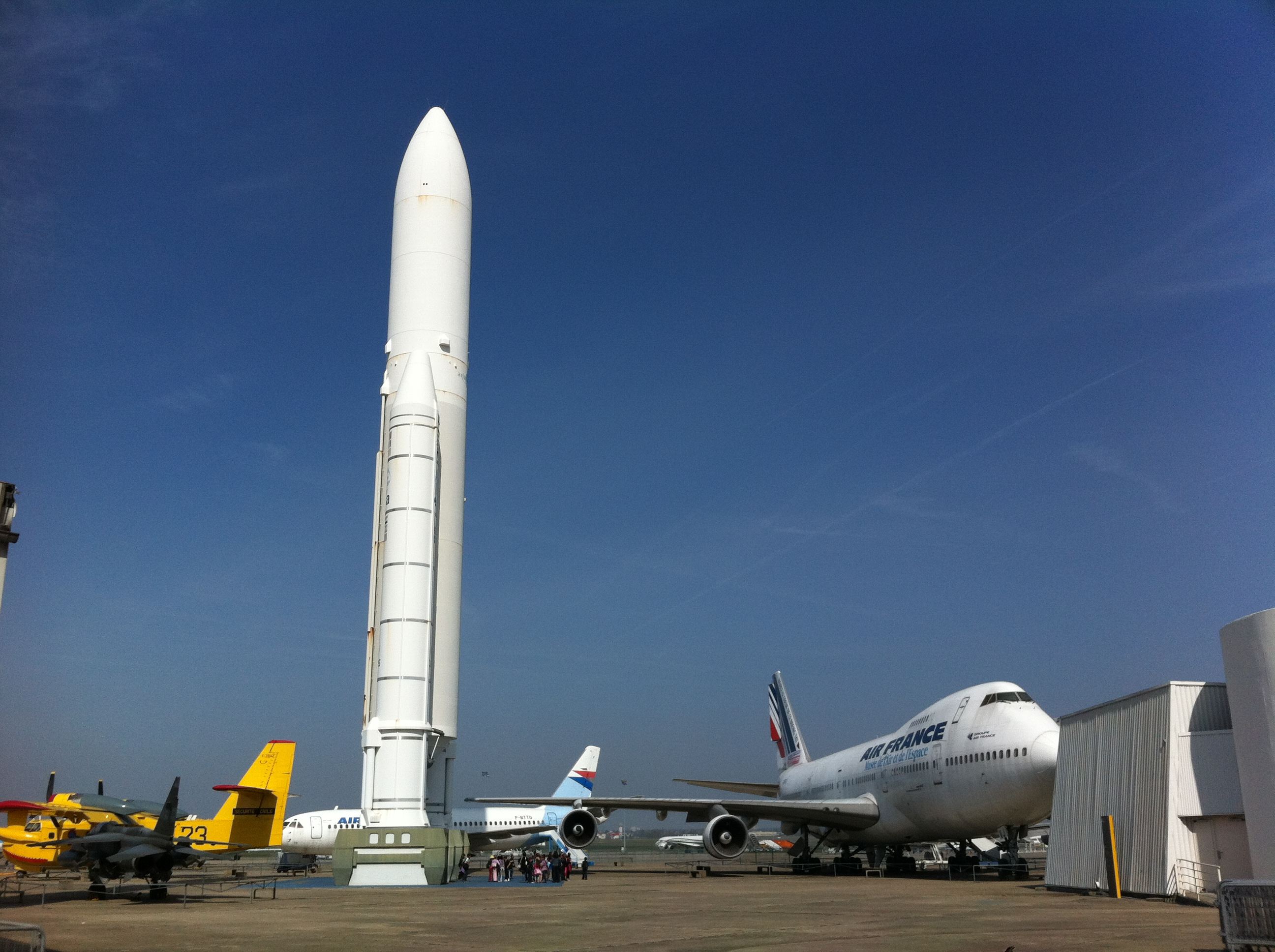
Ariane 5 rocket at Le Bourget Air and Space Museum, Paris

Ariane 5 is a nearly complete redesign. The two hypergolic lower stages are replaced with a single LH2/LOX core stage. This simplifies the stack, along with the use of a single core engine (Vulcain). Because the core cannot lift its own weight, two solid-fuel boosters are strapped to the sides. The boosters can be recovered for examination, but are not reused. There are two versions of the upper stage, one hypergolic and restartable with a single Aestus engine and the other with a HM7B cryogenic engine burning LH2/LOX.

On 4 May 2007, an Ariane 5-ECA rocket set a new commercial payload record, lifting two satellites with a combined mass of 9.4 tonnes.

By January 2006, 169 Ariane flights had boosted 290 satellites, successfully placing 271 of them on orbit (223 main passengers and 48 auxiliary passengers) for a total mass of 575,000 kg successfully delivered on orbit. Attesting to the ubiquity of Ariane launch vehicles, France's Cerise satellite, which was orbited by an Ariane 4 in 1995, struck a discarded Ariane rocket stage in 1996. The incident marked the first verified case of a collision with a piece of catalogued space debris.

On February 16, 2011, the 200th Ariane rocket was launched, successfully carrying the Johannes Kepler ATV into low Earth orbit and providing International Space Station with supplies.

On November 26, 2019, flight number 250 was performed, lifting two communications satellites: TIBA-1 and Inmarsat-5 F5 (GX5).

On December 25, 2021, Ariane flight VA256 lifted NASA's James Webb Space Telescope towards Earth/Sun Lagrange point L2.

Ariane 5 flew its final mission on 5 July 2023.

Ariane Next is in early development, due for launch from the 2030s.

== See also ==
- List of Ariane launches
- Liquid fly-back booster
- Comparison of orbital launcher families
- Diamant
- Europa (rocket)
- Vega
- French space program
- European Space Agency
- Arianespace
