= Ariane 6 =

European space launch vehicle

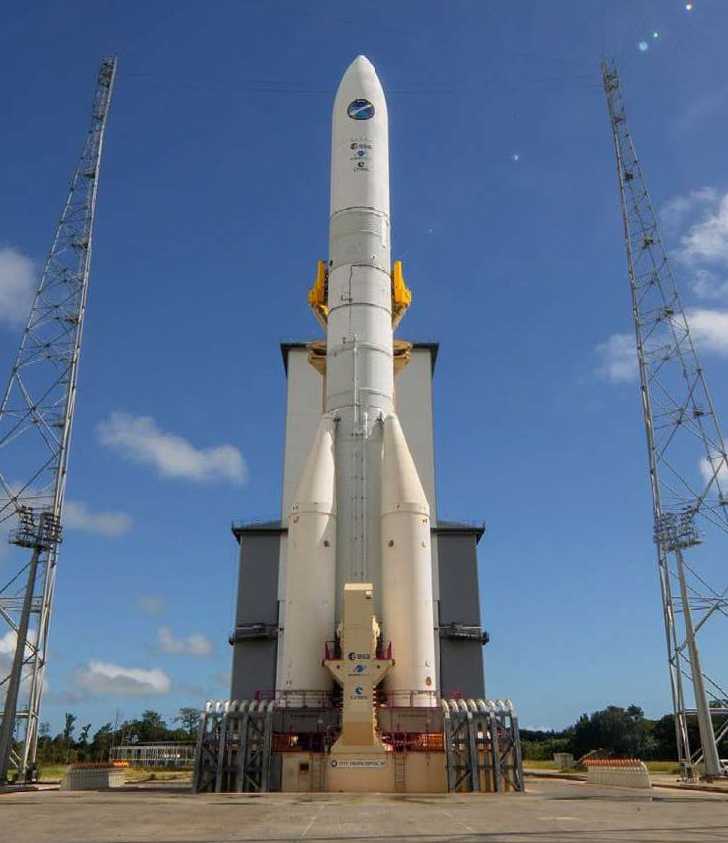
- Mockup of Ariane 6 in the 64 configuration during testing at the Guiana Space Centre
- Function: A62: Medium-lift launch vehicle; A64: Heavy-lift launch vehicle
- Manufacturer: ArianeGroup
- Country of origin: European multi-national (Note: The lead manufacturer is from France, but the rocket has significant contributions from companies based in Austria, Belgium, Czech Republic, Germany, Italy, Ireland, Netherlands, Norway, Spain, Sweden and Switzerland.)
- Project cost: €3.7 billion
- Cost per launch: A62: €100 million (2024 est.); A64: €115 million (2018 est.)

Size
- Height: 63 m (207 ft)
- Diameter: 5.4 m (18 ft)
- Mass: A62: 530,000 kg (1,170,000 lb); A64: 860,000 kg (1,900,000 lb)
- Stages: 2

Capacity

Payload to LEO
- Mass: A62: 10,350 kg (22,820 lb); A64: 21,650 kg (47,730 lb)

Payload to GTO
- Orbital inclination: 6°
- Mass: A62: 4,500 kg (9,900 lb); A64: 11,500 kg (25,400 lb)

Payload to GEO
- Orbital inclination: 0°
- Mass: A64: 5,000 kg (11,000 lb)

Payload to SSO
- Orbital inclination: 97.4°
- Mass: A62: 7,200 kg (15,900 lb); A64: 15,500 kg (34,200 lb)

Payload to LTO
- Orbital inclination: 97.4°
- Mass: A62: 3,500 kg (7,700 lb); A64: 8,600 kg (19,000 lb)

Associated rockets
- Family: Ariane
- Based on: Ariane 5
- Comparable: A62: Falcon 9; H3; LVM3; Soyuz-2; A64: Falcon Heavy; Terran R; Vulcan Centaur; New Glenn; Long March 5; Angara A5

Launch history
- Status: Active
- Launch sites: Guiana, ELA-4
- Total launches: 9
- Success(es): 8
- Failure: 0
- Partial failure: 1 (VA262)
- First flight: 9 July 2024
- Last flight: 27 August 2026 (most recent)

Boosters (Block 1) – P120C
- No. boosters: 2 or 4
- Height: 13.5 m (44 ft 3 in)
- Diameter: 3.4 m (11 ft)
- Empty mass: 11,200 kg (24,700 lb)
- Gross mass: 153,000 kg (337,000 lb)
- Propellant mass: 141,400 kg (311,700 lb)
- Maximum thrust: 4,780 kN (1,070,000 lb_{f}) each
- Total thrust: A62: 9,560 kN (2,150,000 lb_{f}); A64: 19,120 kN (4,300,000 lb_{f})
- Specific impulse: 280 s (2.7 km/s)
- Burn time: 134 seconds
- Propellant: HTPB / AP / Al

Boosters (Block 2) – P160C
- No. boosters: 2 or 4
- Height: 14.5 m (47 ft 7 in)
- Diameter: 3.4 m (11 ft 2 in)
- Gross mass: 167,000 kg (368,000 lb)
- Propellant mass: 155,600 kg (343,000 lb)
- Maximum thrust: 4,780 kN (1,070,000 lb_{f}) each
- Total thrust: A62: 9,560 kN (2,150,000 lb_{f}); A64: 19,120 kN (4,300,000 lb_{f})
- Specific impulse: 278.5 s (2.731 km/s)
- Burn time: 137 seconds
- Propellant: HTPB / AP / Al

First stage – LLPM
- Diameter: 5.4 m (18 ft)
- Propellant mass: 140,000 kg (310,000 lb)
- Powered by: 1 × Vulcain 2.1
- Maximum thrust: 1,370 kN (310,000 lb_{f})
- Burn time: 468 seconds
- Propellant: LOX / LH_{2}

Second stage – ULPM
- Diameter: 5.4 m (18 ft)
- Empty mass: 6,000 kg (13,000 lb)
- Propellant mass: 32,000 kg (71,000 lb)
- Powered by: 1 × Vinci
- Maximum thrust: 180 kN (40,000 lb_{f})
- Burn time: Up to 900 seconds and four burns
- Propellant: LOX / LH_{2}

Ariane 6 (French: [aʁjan sis]) is a European expendable launch system developed for the European Space Agency (ESA) and French Space Agency (CNES) and manufactured by a consortium of European companies, led by the prime contractor ArianeGroup. As part of the Ariane rocket family, it is operated by Arianespace, replacing the Ariane 5. The project's primary contributors were France (55.3%), Germany (21%) and Italy (7.6%), with the remaining work distributed among ten other participating countries.

This two-stage rocket utilizes liquid hydrogen and liquid oxygen (hydrolox) engines. The first stage features an upgraded Vulcain engine from Ariane 5, while the second uses the Vinci engine, designed specifically for this rocket. The Ariane 62 variant uses two P120C solid rocket boosters, while Ariane 64 uses four. The P120C booster is shared with Europe's other launch vehicle Vega C, and is an improved version of the P80 used on the original Vega.

Selected in December 2014 over an all-solid-fuel alternative, Ariane 6 was initially planned for a 2020 debut. However, the program faced delays, with the first launch eventually taking place on 9 July 2024. While the rocket successfully launched, the mission experienced a partial failure when the upper stage malfunctioned and was not able to complete its final deorbit burn. The second launch was therefore postponed to 6 March 2025, successfully delivering its first commercial payload to orbit, the CSO-3 reconnaissance satellite.

Ariane 6 was designed to reduce launch costs and increase annual launch capacity from seven to eleven missions compared with its predecessor. As of 2026, the targeted launch rate has not yet been achieved, although the cost per kilogram to orbit has been reduced by 40%. The program has faced criticism over its development costs and lack of reusability compared with competing vehicles such as SpaceX's Falcon 9. European officials have defended the program, stating that it ensures independent access to space for participating member states.

== Description ==
Three variants of Ariane 6 are offered:

- Ariane 62 (A62), with two P120C solid boosters, weighs around 530,000 kg (1,170,000 lb) at liftoff and is mainly for government and scientific missions. It can launch up to 4,500 kg (9,900 lb) into geosynchronous transfer orbit (GTO) and 10,350 kg (22,820 lb) into low Earth orbit (LEO). The first launch in July 2024 used this variant.
- Ariane 64 (A64), with four P120C boosters, has a liftoff weight of around 860,000 kg (1,900,000 lb) and is intended for commercial dual-satellite launches of up to 11,500 kg (25,400 lb) into GTO and 21,500 kg (47,400 lb) into LEO. Like Ariane 5, it is able to launch two geosynchronous satellites together. This variant was first launched in February 2026.
- Ariane 64 Block 2, with four boosters using the P160C motor, which is 1 m (3 ft 3 in) longer than the P120C and carries about 14 t (31,000 lb) more solid propellant. According to Arianespace, the P160C increases Ariane 6 payload capacity to low Earth orbit by more than two tonnes, allowing 36 Amazon Leo satellites per launch compared with 32 on Block 1. This variant was first launched on 17 June 2026 (flight VA269). As proposed by ESA in 2022, Block 2 was to combine the larger boosters with improvements to the Vinci upper-stage engine, increasing capacity to LEO by three tonnes. An uprated 200 kN (45,000 lbf) version of the Vinci engine is in development under an ESA contract; ArianeGroup tested it at Lampoldshausen during 2025, including a 570-second firing. ESA has also identified a lighter Vulcain Aft Bay, the structure supporting the Vulcain 2.1 engine at the base of the core stage, as part of the near-term upgrade roadmap. According to Airbus Netherlands, the redesigned structure is 880 kg (1,940 lb) lighter than the Block 1 design; the first unit (Flight Model 16) was delivered in October 2026 and is expected to fly in 2027.

Rocket components are transported by sea from Europe to the Guiana Space Centre aboard the Canopée, a cargo vessel that uses sails to assist with its propulsion, reducing fuel use.

=== First stage ===
The first (lower) stage of Ariane 6 is called the Lower Liquid Propulsion Module (LLPM). It is powered by a single Vulcain 2.1 engine fuelled by liquid hydrogen (LH_{2}) with liquid oxygen (LOX). The LLPM is 5.4 m (18 ft) in diameter and contains approximately 140 tonnes (310,000 lb) of propellant.

=== Boosters ===
Additional thrust is provided by either P120C or P160C model solid rocket boosters, designated in Ariane 6 nomenclature as Equipped Solid Rockets (ESR). Each P120C booster contains approximately 142,000 kilograms (313,000 lb) of propellant and delivers up to 4,650 kN (1,050,000 lb_{f}) of thrust.

The P120C and P160C are also used as the first stage of the upgraded Vega C launcher, allowing increased production volumes and reduced unit costs through commonality. They are improved versions of the P80 motor used on the original Vega.

=== Second stage ===
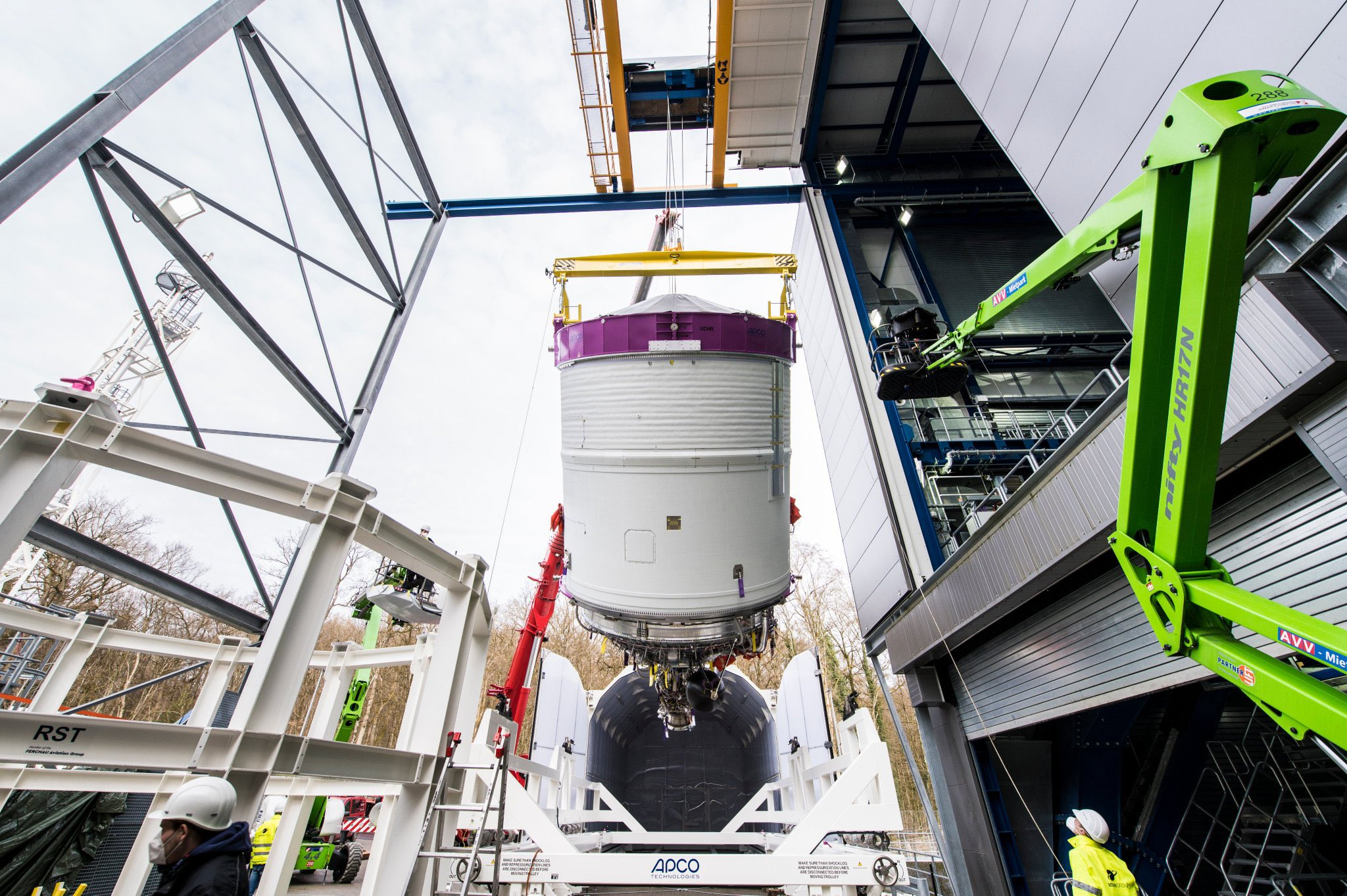
An ULPM prototype in 2021.

The second (upper) stage of Ariane 6 is called the Upper Liquid Propulsion Module (ULPM). It shares the same 5.4 m (18 ft) diameter as the LLPM and is also fuelled by LH_{2} and LOX. It is powered by the Vinci engine, which delivers 180 kN (40,000 lb_{f}) of thrust, burns for up to 900 seconds and is capable of up to five restarts. The ULPM carries about 32 tonnes (71,000 lb) of propellant and has a dry mass of 6 tonnes (13,000 lb).

=== Fairing ===
The payload fairing, constructed by Beyond Gravity from a carbon fibre-polymer composite, is designed as a nose cone that splits vertically into two halves at the top of the Ariane 6 rocket. It is available in two sizes: a long 20-metre (66 ft) version and a short 14-metre (46 ft) version, both with a diameter of 5.4 metres (18 ft). The interior of the cylindrical payload compartment is 4.6 metres (15 ft) in diameter and the long variant measures 11 metres (36 ft) in height, or 18 metres (59 ft) when including the conical portion of the fairing. As of August 2026, only Amazon Leo launches have used the long fairing in the A64L configuration.

== Future upgrades ==
=== ASTRIS ===
The Ariane Smart Transfer and Release In-orbit Ship (ASTRIS) was originally conceived as a kick stage for Ariane 6 to place payloads into higher or otherwise different orbits, but in November 2025 the European Space Agency approved its evolution into a space tug. Designed as an optional addition to Ariane 6's upper stage, ASTRIS will have a steerable, restartable main engine, allowing it to place payloads directly into their operational orbits, including separate orbits for multiple payloads on a single launch and trajectories for missions to the Moon, Mars and asteroids. Ground qualification is expected by the end of 2028, with the first flight planned for 2029.

=== Crew rating ===
The European Space Agency is exploring human-rating certification for Ariane 6, awarding Arianespace a contract to explore potential options for enabling crewed missions to be launched aboard the vehicle.

== History ==
Ariane 6 was conceived in the early 2010s to be a replacement launch vehicle for Ariane 5, and a number of concepts and high-level designs were suggested and proposed during 2012–2015. Development funding from several European governments was secured by early 2016, and contracts were signed to begin detailed design and the build of test articles. In 2019, the maiden orbital flight had been planned for 2020, however by May 2020, the planned initial launch date was delayed into 2021. In October 2020, the European Space Agency (ESA) formally requested an additional €230 million in funding from the countries sponsoring the project to complete development of the rocket and get the vehicle to its first test flight, which had slipped to the second quarter of 2022. By June 2021, the date had delayed to late 2022. In June 2022, a delay was announced to "some time in 2023" and by October 2022, ESA clarified that the first launch would be no earlier than the fourth quarter of 2023, while providing no public reason for the delay. In August 2023, ESA announced that the date for the first launch had slipped again to 2024.

=== Concept and early development: 2010–2015 ===
Ariane 6 PPH cutaway drawing

Following detailed definition studies in 2012, ESA announced in July 2013 the selection of Ariane 6's PPH (first stage of three P145 rocket motors, second stage of one P145 rocket motor, and H32 cryogenic upper stage) configuration for Ariane 6. It would be capable of launching up to 6,500 kg (14,300 lb) to Geostationary transfer orbit (GTO), with a first flight projected to be as early as 2021–2022. Development was projected to cost €4 billion as of May 2013. A 2014 study concluded that development cost could be reduced to about €3 billion by limiting contractors to five countries.

While Ariane 5 typically launches one large and one medium satellite at a time, the PPH proposal for Ariane 6 was intended for single payloads, with an early 2014 price estimate of approximately US$95 million per launch. The SpaceX Falcon 9 and the Chinese Long March 3B both launch smaller payloads but at lower prices, approximately $57 million and $72 million respectively as of early 2014, making the Falcon 9 launch of a midsize satellite competitive with the cost of the lower slot of a dual payload Ariane 5. For lightweight all-electric satellites, Arianespace intended to use the restartable Vinci engine to deliver the satellites closer to their operational orbit than the Falcon 9 could, thus reducing the time required to transfer to geostationary orbit by several months.

==== Ariane 6.1 and Ariane 6.2 proposals ====
In June 2014, Airbus and Safran surprised ESA by announcing a counter proposal for the Ariane 6 project: a 50/50 joint venture to develop the rocket, which would also involve buying out the French government's CNES interest in Arianespace.

This proposed launch system would come in two variants, Ariane 6.1 and Ariane 6.2. While both would use a cryogenic main stage powered by a Vulcain 2 engine and two P145 solid boosters, Ariane 6.1 would feature a cryogenic upper stage powered by the Vinci engine and boost up to 8,500 kg (18,700 lb) to GTO, while Ariane 6.2 would use a lower-cost hypergolic upper stage powered by the Aestus engine. Ariane 6.1 would have the ability to launch two electrically powered satellites at once, while Ariane 6.2 would be focused on launching government payloads.

French newspaper La Tribune questioned whether Airbus Defence and Space could deliver on the promised costs for their Ariane 6 proposal, and whether Airbus and Safran Group could be trusted when they were found to be responsible for a failure of Ariane 5 flight 517 in 2002 and a more recent 2013 failure of the M51 ballistic missile. The companies were also criticised for being unwilling to incur development risks, and asking for higher initial funding than originally planned – €2.6 billion instead of €2.3 billion. Estimated launch prices of €85 million for Ariane 6.1 and €69 million for Ariane 6.2 did not compare favourably to SpaceX offerings. During the meeting of EU ministers in Geneva on 7 June 2014, these prices were deemed too high and no agreement with manufacturers was reached.

==== Ariane 62 and Ariane 64 proposals ====
Originally proposed Ariane A62 and Ariane A64

Following criticism of the Ariane 6 PPH design, France unveiled a revised Ariane 6 proposal in September 2014. This launcher would use a cryogenic main stage powered by the Vulcain 2 and upper stage powered by the Vinci but vary the number of solid boosters. With two P120C boosters, Ariane 6 would launch up to 5,000 kg (11,000 lb) to GTO at a cost of €75 million. With four boosters, Ariane 6 would be able to launch two satellites totalling 11,000 kg (24,000 lb) to GTO at a cost of €90 million.

This proposal, unlike Ariane 6 PPH, offered a scalable launcher while retaining Ariane 5's dual-launch capability. The proposal also included simplification of the industrial and institutional organisation along with a better and cheaper version of the Vulcain 2 engine for the main stage. Although Ariane 6 was projected to have "lower estimated recurring production costs", it was projected to have "a higher overall development cost owing to the need for a new, Ariane 6-dedicated, launch pad".

The Italian, French, and German space ministers met on 23 September 2014, in order to plan strategy and assess the possibility for agreement on funding for the Ariane 5 successor, and in December 2014, ESA selected the Ariane 62 and Ariane 64 designs for development and funding.

At the 2022 International Astronautical Congress, ArianeGroup announced the proposed "Smart Upper Stage for Innovative Exploration", a reusable upper stage for the 64 (or later) variant, capable of autonomous cargo operations or carrying five astronauts to LEO.

=== Test vehicle development: 2016–2021 ===
Ariane 62 (left) and Ariane 64 (right), final design

In November 2015, an updated design of Ariane 64 and 62 was presented, with new nose cones on the boosters, main stage diameter increased to 5.4 m (18 ft), and the height decreased to 60 m (200 ft).

The basic design for Ariane 6 was finalised in January 2016 as an expendable liquid-fuelled core stage plus expendable solid-rocket-boosters design. Development advanced into detailed design and production phases, with the first major contracts already signed. Unlike previous Ariane rockets, which are assembled and fuelled vertically before being transported to the launchpad, the Ariane 6 main stages were to be assembled horizontally at the new integration hall in Les Mureaux and then transported to French Guiana, to be erected and integrated with boosters and payload.

The horizontal assembly process was inspired by the Russian tradition for Soyuz and Proton launchers – which had more recently been applied to the American Delta IV and Falcon 9 boosters – with a stated goal of halving production costs.

The industrial production process was completely overhauled, allowing synchronized workflow between several European production sites moving at a monthly cadence, which would enable twelve launches per year, doubling Ariane 5's yearly capacity. To further lower the price, Ariane 6 engines were to use 3D printed components.

Reorganisation of the industry behind a new launch vehicle, leading to the creation of Airbus Safran Launchers (ASL), also started a review by the French government into tax matters, and the European Commission over a possible conflict of interest if Airbus Defence and Space, a satellite manufacturer, were to purchase launches from ASL.

While development was initially slated to be substantially complete in 2019, with an initial launch in 2020, the initial launch date has slipped several times: first to 2021, then to 2022, then to 2023, and then to 2024. In October 2022, Arianespace expected the maiden flight to occur in 2023, although in December 2023, Arianespace once again set the flight to occur on 15 June 2024. In June 2024, ESA Executive said its first launch was postponed to July 9th 2024. The maiden flight VA262 took place 9 July 2024 and successfully orbited satellites even though the Vinci engine failed to ignite for a third time to de-orbit the upper stage.

=== Abandoned proposals ===
CNES began studies in 2010 on an alternative, reusable first stage for Ariane 6, using a mix of liquid oxygen and liquid methane rather than liquid hydrogen that is used in the 2016 Ariane 6 first-stage design. The methane-powered core could use one or more engines, matching capabilities of Ariane 64 with only two boosters instead of four. As of January 2015, the economic feasibility of reusing an entire stage remained in question. Concurrent with the liquid fly-back booster research in the late 1990s and early 2000s, CNES along with Russia concluded studies indicating that reusing the first stage was economically unviable as manufacturing ten rockets a year was cheaper and more feasible than recovery, refurbishment and loss of performance caused by reusability.

In June 2015, Airbus Defence and Space announced that Adeline, a partially reusable first stage, would become operational between 2025 and 2030 and that it would be developed as a subsequent first stage for Ariane 6. Rather than developing a way to reuse an entire first stage (like SpaceX), Airbus proposed a system where only high-value parts would be safely returned using a winged module at the bottom of the rocket stack.

In August 2016, ASL gave some more details about future development plans building on the Ariane 6 design. CEO Alain Charmeau revealed that Airbus Safran were now working along two main lines: first, continuing work (at the company's own expense) on the recoverable Adeline engine-and-avionics module; and second, beginning development of a next-generation engine to be called Prometheus. This engine would have about the same thrust as the Vulcain 2 currently powering Ariane 5 but would burn methane instead of liquid hydrogen. Charmeau was non-committal about whether Prometheus (still only in the first few months of development) could be used as an expendable replacement for the Vulcain 2 in Ariane 6, or whether it was tied to the re-usable Adeline design, saying only that "We are cautious, and we prefer to speak when are sure of what we announce... But certainly this engine could very well fit with the first stage of Ariane 6 one day", a decision on whether to proceed with Prometheus in an expendable or reusable role could be made between 2025 and 2030. Charmeau was not positive about reusability in 2018, stating that if Ariane had a launch schedule of ten flights per year and had a rocket that could be reused ten times, the company would only build one rocket per year, making supporting an ongoing manufacturing supply chain unviable. Ariane would need 30 launches a year to justify the cost of researching reusability, he said.

In 2017, the Prometheus engine project was revealed to have the aim of reducing the engine unit cost from the €10 million of the Vulcain 2 to €1 million and allowing the engine to be reused up to five times. The engine development is said to be part of a broader effort – codename Ariane NEXT – to reduce Ariane launch costs by a factor of two beyond improvements brought by Ariane 6. The Ariane NEXT initiative includes a reusable sounding rocket, Callisto, to test the performance of various fuels in new engine designs.

==== Block 3 ====
A proposed Ariane 6 Block 3 was shelved by the European Space Agency in 2026. ESA said there was "no programme need or justification" for the upgrade. A major element of the proposed upgrade was a lightweight upper stage using carbon-fibre-reinforced polymer structures. The design was intended to reduce the upper stage's mass by several tonnes, allowing for greater payload capacity.

=== Production ===
In a January 2019 interview, Arianespace CEO Stéphane Israël said that the company would require four more institutional launches for Ariane 6 to sign a manufacturing contract. Launch contracts would be needed for the transitional period of 2020–2023 when Ariane 5 will be phased out and gradually replaced by Ariane 6. The company would require European institutions to become an anchor customer for the launcher. In response, ESA representatives said the agency was working on shifting the 2022 launch of the Jupiter Icy Moons Explorer from Ariane 5 ECA to Ariane 64, further indicating that there are other institutional customers in Europe that must put their weight behind the project, such as the European Organisation for the Exploitation of Meteorological Satellites (EUMETSAT) or the European Commission.

As of January 2019, Arianespace had sold three flights of the Ariane 6 launch vehicle. One month later, they added a satellite internet constellation launch contract with OneWeb to utilize the maiden launch of Ariane 6 to help populate the large 600-satellite constellation.

On 6 May 2019, Arianespace ordered the first production batch of 14 Ariane 6 rockets. In late 2025, the company ordered long lead time components for 27 more Ariane 6 rockets, enough for launches to 2030.

In 2024, Arianespace expected that their launch tempo would increase to six in 2025, eight in 2026, and stabilize at ten per year starting in 2027.

By the end of 2025, Ariane 6 had more than 30 launches booked, covering about four years of launch activity, including 18 launches for the Amazon Leo satellite constellation. Up to eight launches were planned for 2026.

== Development funding ==
Ariane 6 was developed in a public-private partnership with the majority of the funding coming from various ESA government sources. As of 2015, the estimated government development cost over the then planned 6-year development phase through 2020 was €2.815 billion of government-provided funds, while €400 million was reported to be "industry's share". At the time, in a novel approach for ESA, this was to be "an arrangement in which the [Airbus Safran] company takes full control of Ariane 6 design and development and commits to a firm, fixed-price contract"

By the time the ESA Council approved the project in November 2016, the ESA had already paid out €688 million to Airbus Safran and the ESA Industrial Policy Committee released €1.7 billion of additional funds on 8 November 2016.

In January 2020, two EU institutions, the European Investment Bank and the European Commission, loaned €100 million to Arianespace, drawing from the Horizon 2020 and Investment Plan for Europe corporate investment programmes. The 10-year loan's repayment is tied to the financial success of the Ariane 6 project.

As of August 2026, Europe had invested about €3.6 billion in the development of Ariane 6 and its launch site in French Guiana. ESA Director General Josef Aschbacher said that, based on a launch rate of nine flights per year, European governments would need to subsidise each Ariane 6 launch by between €32 and 38 million.

== Launch history ==
=== List of launches ===
Flight No.	Launch (UTC)	Version, Serial No.	Launch site	Payload	Payload mass	Orbit	Customer	Launch outcome
VA262	9 July 2024; 19:00	Ariane 62; L6001	Guiana, ELA‑4	Multiple rideshare payloads	1,600 kg (3,500 lb)	LEO	Various	Partial failure
VA262	Maiden flight of Ariane 6. It was a flight test carrying a mass simulator plus a number of small cubesats and other experiments as rideshare payloads. Rocket launched successfully to orbit and upper stage performed a second burn to release cubesats. During attempt to perform a third burn to deorbit the upper stage, the rocket's auxiliary propulsion system failed. This failure prevented the upper stage from relighting.							
VA263	6 March 2025; 16:24	Ariane 62; L6002	Guiana, ELA‑4	CSO-3	3,655 kg (8,058 lb)	SSO	CNES / DGA	Success
VA263	French military reconnaissance satellite. First recompensed launch for Ariane 6. After releasing the satellite following two burns of the upper stage, the Vinci engine successfully completed a third burn to reenter Earth's atmosphere, a maneuver that had failed in the first Ariane 6 flight.							
VA264	13 August 2025; 00:37	Ariane 62; L6003	Guiana, ELA‑4	MetOp-SG A1/Sentinel-5A	4,040 kg (8,910 lb)	SSO	EUMETSAT	Success
VA264	Second-generation polar-orbiting meteorological satellite system to replace the first-generation METOP satellites. First Ariane 6 night launch.							
VA265	4 November 2025; 21:02	Ariane 62; L6005	Guiana, ELA‑4	Sentinel-1D	2,184 kg (4,815 lb)	SSO	ESA	Success
VA265	Radar imaging satellite. Second of two additional satellites in the Sentinel-1 constellation, part of the Copernicus programme on Earth observation. The satellite is equipped with a C-SAR sensor, capable of providing high-resolution imagery regardless of weather conditions.							
VA266	17 December 2025; 05:01	Ariane 62; L6004	Guiana, ELA‑4	Galileo L14	1,466 kg (3,232 lb)	MEO	ESA	Success
VA266	FM33 and FM34 satellites for Galileo GNSS.							
VA267	12 February 2026; 16:45	Ariane 64L; L6006	Guiana, ELA‑4	LeoSat × 32 (LE-01)	~20,000 kg (44,000 lb)	LEO	Amazon (Amazon Leo)	Success
VA267	First Ariane 64 launch, first use of long fairing, and first Ariane launch for Amazon Leo, formerly known as Project Kuiper.							
VA268	30 April 2026; 08:57	Ariane 64L; L6007	Guiana, ELA‑4	LeoSat × 32 (LE-02)	~20,000 kg (44,000 lb)	LEO	Amazon (Amazon Leo)	Success
VA268	Last scheduled use of P120C boosters for Amazon Leo. Payload delivered 12 March 2026. First Ariane 64 night launch.							
VA269	17 June 2026; 12:21	Ariane 64L Block 2 L6009	Guiana, ELA‑4	LeoSat × 36 (LE-03)	~22,000 kg (49,000 lb)	LEO	Amazon (Amazon Leo)	Success
VA269	First Ariane 64 Block 2 launch using P160C boosters. Heaviest payload ever launched by Ariane.							
VA270	27 August 2026; 20:11	Ariane 62; L6008	Guiana, ELA‑4	MTG-I2	3,760 kg (8,290 lb)	GTO	EUMETSAT	Success
VA270	First flight to geostationary transfer orbit.							

=== Planned launches ===
Launch (UTC)	Type	Payload	Orbit	Customers
NET 23 November 2026	Ariane 64L Block 2	LeoSat × 36 (LE-04)	LEO	Amazon (Amazon Leo)
November 2026	Ariane 62	MetOp-SG-B1	SSO	EUMETSAT
December 2026	Ariane 62	Galileo L15	MEO	ESA
December 2026	Two FOC satellites			
20 April 2027	Ariane 62	PLATO	Sun–Earth L_{2}	ESA
20 April 2027	HENON CubeSat as secondary payload			
Q1 2027	Ariane 62	Galileo L16	MEO	ESA
Q1 2027	Two FOC satellites			
H2 2027	Ariane 6	NEXUS-1	GTO	Katalyst
2027	Ariane 62 Block 2	Galileo L17	MEO	ESA
2027	First launch of Galileo Second Generation (GSG) satellites.			
2027	Ariane 62 Block 2	Galileo L18	MEO	ESA
2027	Two GSG satellites			
2027	Ariane 64	OneWeb	Polar	Eutelsat
August 2028	Ariane 64	Comet Interceptor	Sun–Earth L_{2}	ESA
November 2028	Ariane 64	Nyx ALADDIN	LEO	The Exploration Company
H2 2028	Ariane 64	Koreasat 9	GTO	KT Sat
H2 2028	Designated rideshare launch			
2028	Ariane 64	Intelsat 45 (Rideshare)	GTO	Intelsat
2028	Ariane 64	OneWeb	Polar	Eutelsat
2028	Ariane 64	Optus-11	GTO	Optus
2029	Ariane 64	ComSatBw 1B	GTO	Bundeswehr
2029	Ariane 64	ComSatBw 2B	GTO	Bundeswehr
2029	Ariane 64	GovSat-2	GTO	GovSat partnership
2029	Ariane 6	Hellas Sat 5	GTO	Hellas Sat
2031	Ariane 62	ARIEL	Sun–Earth L_{2}	ESA
2031	Ariane 64	Argonaut 1	TLI	ESA
2031	Ariane 64	EnVision	Venusian	ESA
2035	Ariane 64	Athena	Sun–Earth L_{2}, Halo orbit	ESA
2035	Ariane 6	LISA	Heliocentric	ESA
TBD	Ariane 64	Argonaut 2 (NovaMoon)	TLI	ESA
TBD	Ariane 64 Block 2	Amazon Leo (LE-05 to LE-24)	LEO	Amazon (Amazon Leo)
TBD	Satellite internet constellation. Remainder of the 24 contracted Ariane 6 launches for Amazon Leo.			
TBD	Ariane 64	Earth Return Orbiter	Areocentric	ESA
TBD	Ariane 62	EDRS-D	MEO	ESA
TBD	Ariane 62	Electra	GTO	SES S.A. / ESA
TBD	Ariane 64	Multi-Launch Service (MLS) #1 rideshare mission	GTO	TBA
TBD	Ariane 6	Uhura-1 (Node-1) Rideshare	GTO	Skyloom

== Criticism ==
The Ariane 6 programme, approved by the ESA in 2012 as a lower-cost successor to Ariane 5, has faced criticism over its development costs, launch price, and lack of reusability. Development extended for more than a decade and was marked by delays and cost overruns. Projected launch prices now exceed €100 million per mission, compared with original estimates of €70 million for the A62 and €90 million for the A64. CNES has stated that the cost-reduction objective has been met, achieving an approximately 40% reduction in cost per kilogram to orbit compared to Ariane 5. Officials have noted that the vehicle's long-term viability in the commercial market will depend on its ability to remain price-competitive against SpaceX's Falcon 9.

A major criticism of the Ariane 6 stems from its reliance on expendable technology at a time when competitors have demonstrated the economic advantages of reusability. For example, SpaceX iteratively developed its Falcon 9 rocket, nearly doubling its payload capacity and making it partially reusable, lowering the company's costs to launch. Some industry experts argued that the decision to forego reusability rendered the Ariane 6 "already obsolete" before it even entered service.

European officials, however, have defended the Ariane 6, citing the strategic necessity for independent access to space. They point to geopolitical disruptions, most notably the loss of access to Russian Soyuz-ST rockets, as evidence that a self-reliant European capability is essential. Officials have also argued that developing a reusable system is unviable at current flight rates.

To support the programme, ESA's member states have agreed to subsidise the Ariane 6 with up to €340 million annually from its 16th to its 42nd flight, expected to occur by 2031. In exchange, governments will receive an 11% discount on launches.
