= ELA-4 =

Launch pad at Kourou Space Centre, French Guiana

Ensemble de Lancement Ariane 4 Ariane Launch Complex 4
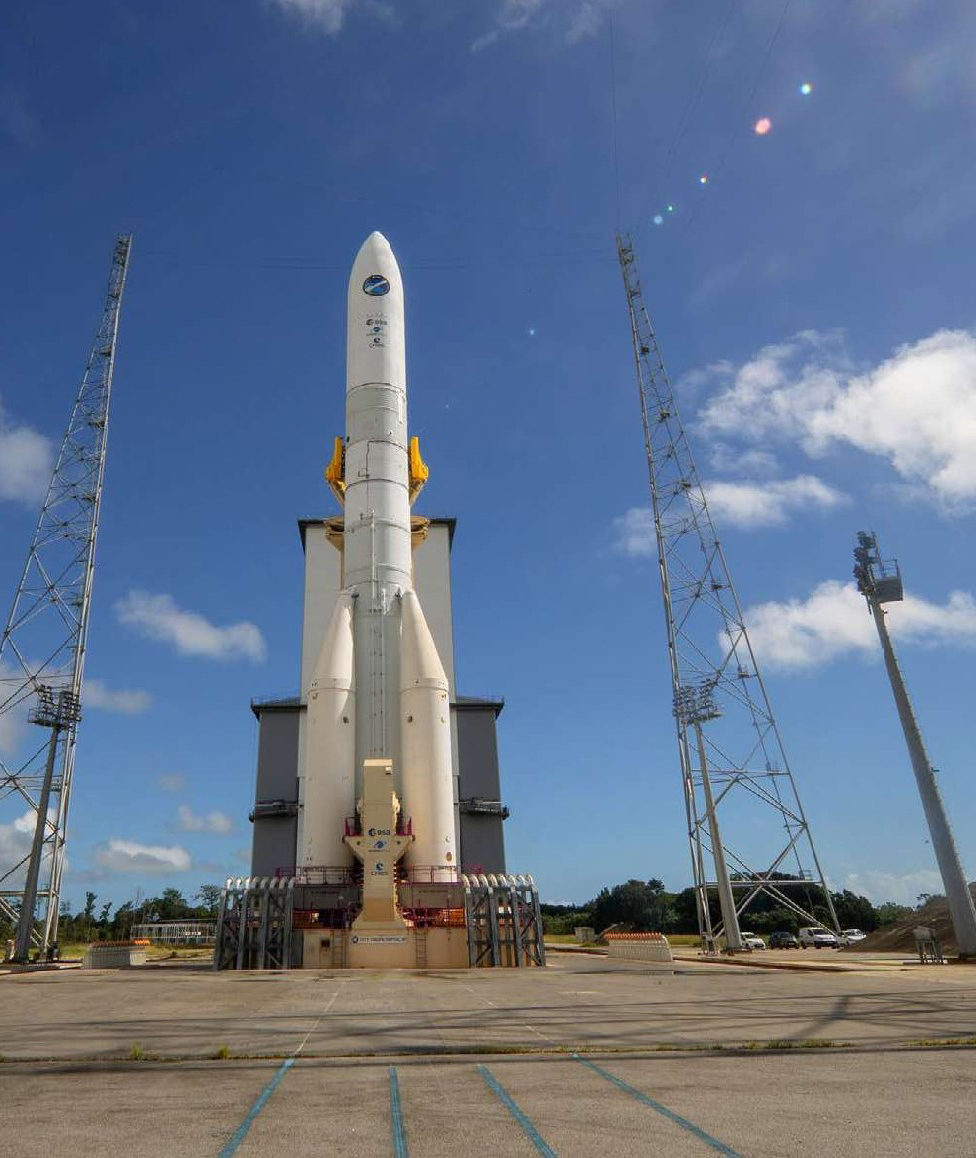
- ELA-4 in 2023, holding a testing mockup of an Ariane 6
- Interactive map of Ensemble de Lancement Ariane 4 Ariane Launch Complex 4
- Launch site: Guiana Space Centre
- Location: 5°15′54″N 52°47′31″W
- Time zone: UTC−03 (GFT)
- Short name: ELA-4
- Established: September 2021
- Operator: Arianespace · ESA
- Launch pad: 1
Launch history
- Status: Active
- Launches: 9
- First launch: 9 July 2024; Ariane 62 (VA262)
- Last launch: 27 August 2026; Ariane 62 (MTG-I2)
- Associated rockets: Current: Ariane 6

Launch pads at the Guiana Space Centre
Active pad
Inactive tenanted pad
Inactive untenanted pad
1 ELFS
2 ELM
3 ELV
4 ELA-2
5 ELA-3
6 ELA-4
7 ELS

ELA-4 (French: Ensemble de Lancement Ariane 4, lit. 'Ariane Launch Complex 4') is a launch complex at the Guiana Space Centre in French Guiana supporting launches of the Ariane 6 program. ELA-4 is located along the Route de l'Espace in the Roche Christine site, between the ELA-3 and ELS launch facilities. The complex is composed of a launch pad with mobile gantry, an horizontal assembly building and a dedicated launch operations building.

== History ==
CNES was responsible for the construction of the Ariane 6 ground segments including the new launch pad. Earthworks on the 170-hectare (420-acre) launch site began at the end of June 2015 and was completed at the start of 2016. Four platforms were levelled to accommodate the launch pad, the liquid oxygen and hydrogen tanks and the assembly building. Civil engineering works on the flame trench and other buildings began in the summer of 2016 and ended in 2019. The launch facility was inaugurated on 28 September 2021 in presence of most of the 600 workers employed at the site, 75% of which recruited locally.

== Launch statistics ==
- Ariane 62
- Ariane 64

No.	Date	Time (UTC)	Launch vehicle	Configuration	Payload	Result	Remarks
1	9 July 2024	19:00	Ariane 6	Ariane 62 Block 1	Multiple rideshares	Partial failure	Maiden flight of Ariane 6 and first launch from ELA-4. Launch was successful but deorbit burn failed, jeopardizing two reentry payloads.
2	6 March 2025	16:24	Ariane 6	Ariane 62 Block 1	CSO-3	Success	First commercial Ariane 6 flight and first completely successful Ariane 6 flight.
3	13 August 2025	00:37	Ariane 6	Ariane 62 Block 1	MetOp-SG-A1/Sentinel-5A	Success	Part of the MetOp-SG series of weather satellites and the Copernicus Programme series of earth observation satellites. First Sentinel launch from an Ariane rocket and from ELA-4.
4	4 November 2025	21:02	Ariane 6	Ariane 62 Block 1	Sentinel-1D	Success	Part of the Copernicus Programme series of earth observation satellites.
5	17 December 2025	05:01	Ariane 6	Ariane 62 Block 1	Galileo FOC FM 33 & 34	Success	Part of the Galileo satellite navigation system. First Galileo launch on Ariane 6.
6	12 February 2026	16:45	Ariane 6	Ariane 64 Block 1	LeoSat LE-01	Success	Maiden flight of Ariane 64. First of eighteen Ariane 6 launches supporting the Amazon Leo megaconstellation.
7	30 April 2026	08:57	Ariane 6	Ariane 64 Block 1	LeoSat LE-02	Success	
8	17 June 2026	12:21	Ariane 6	Ariane 64 Block 2	LeoSat LE-03	Success	
9	27 August 2026	20:11	Ariane 6	Ariane 62 Block 1	MTG-I2	Success	

=== Upcoming launches ===
Date & Time (UTC)	Launch vehicle	Payload
23 November 2026	Ariane 64 Block 2	LeoSat LE-04
December 2026	Ariane 62 Block 1	MetOp-SG B1

== Gallery ==
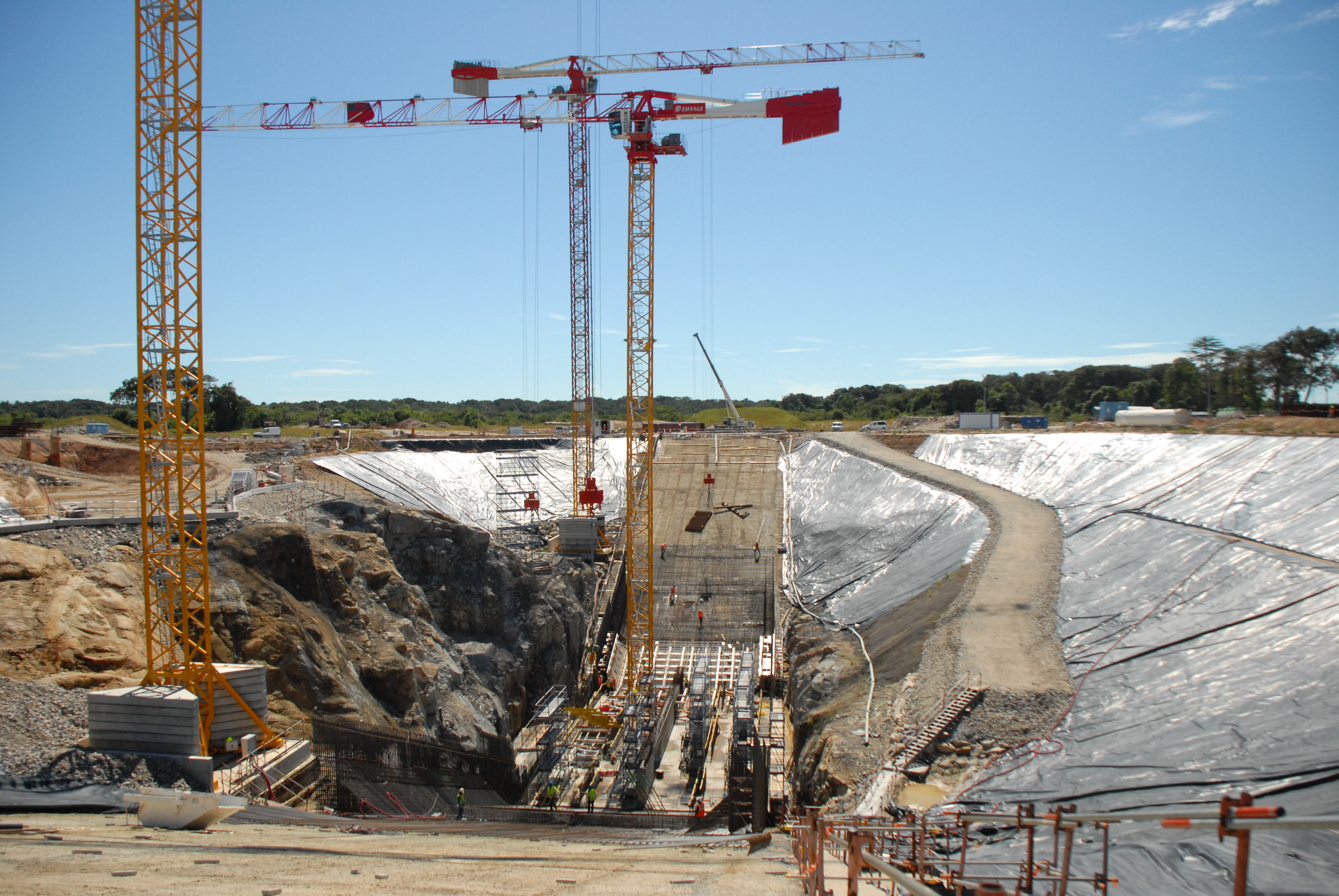
Earthworks for the flame trench in August 2017

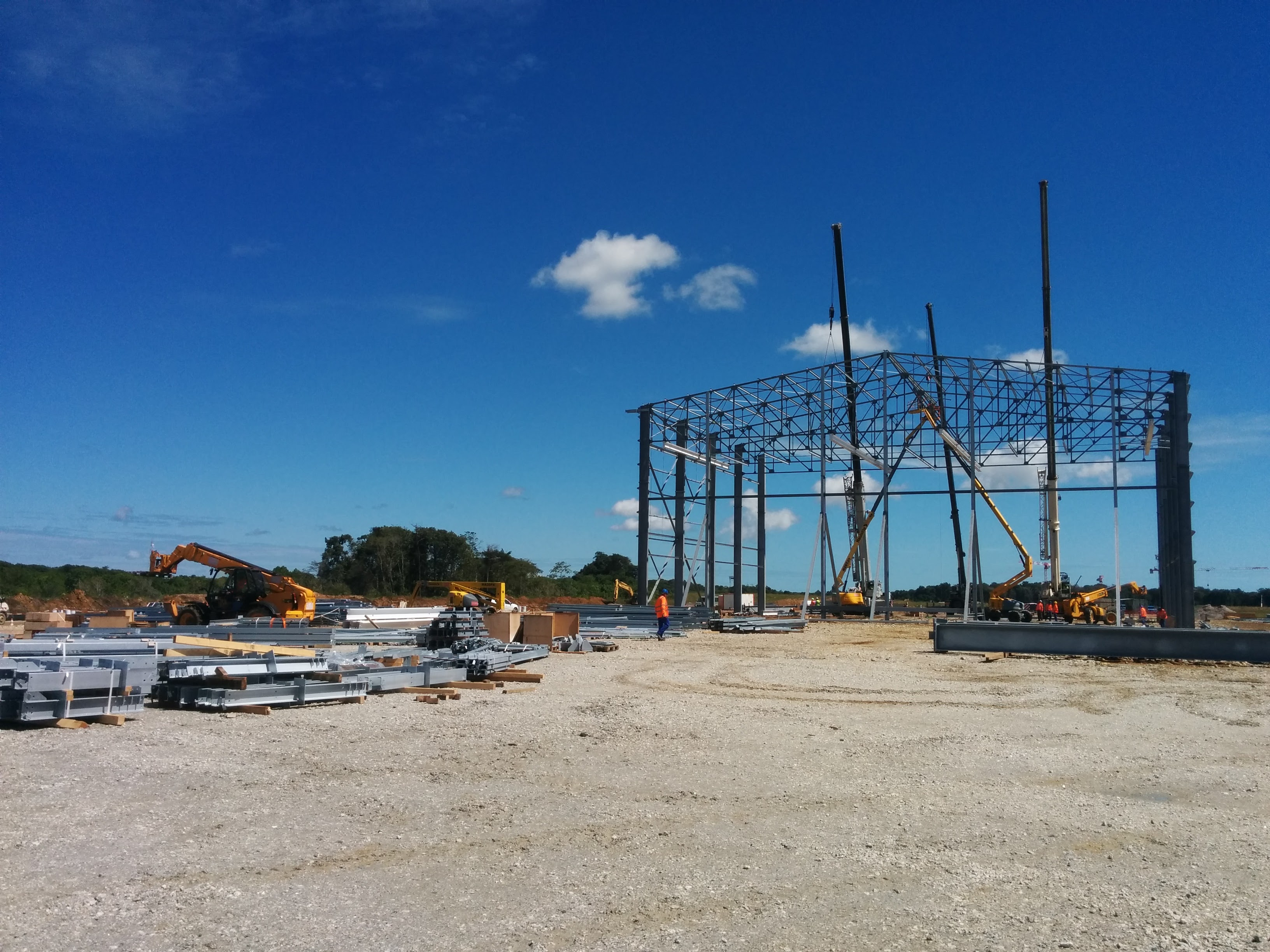
Horizontal assembly building construction in 2017

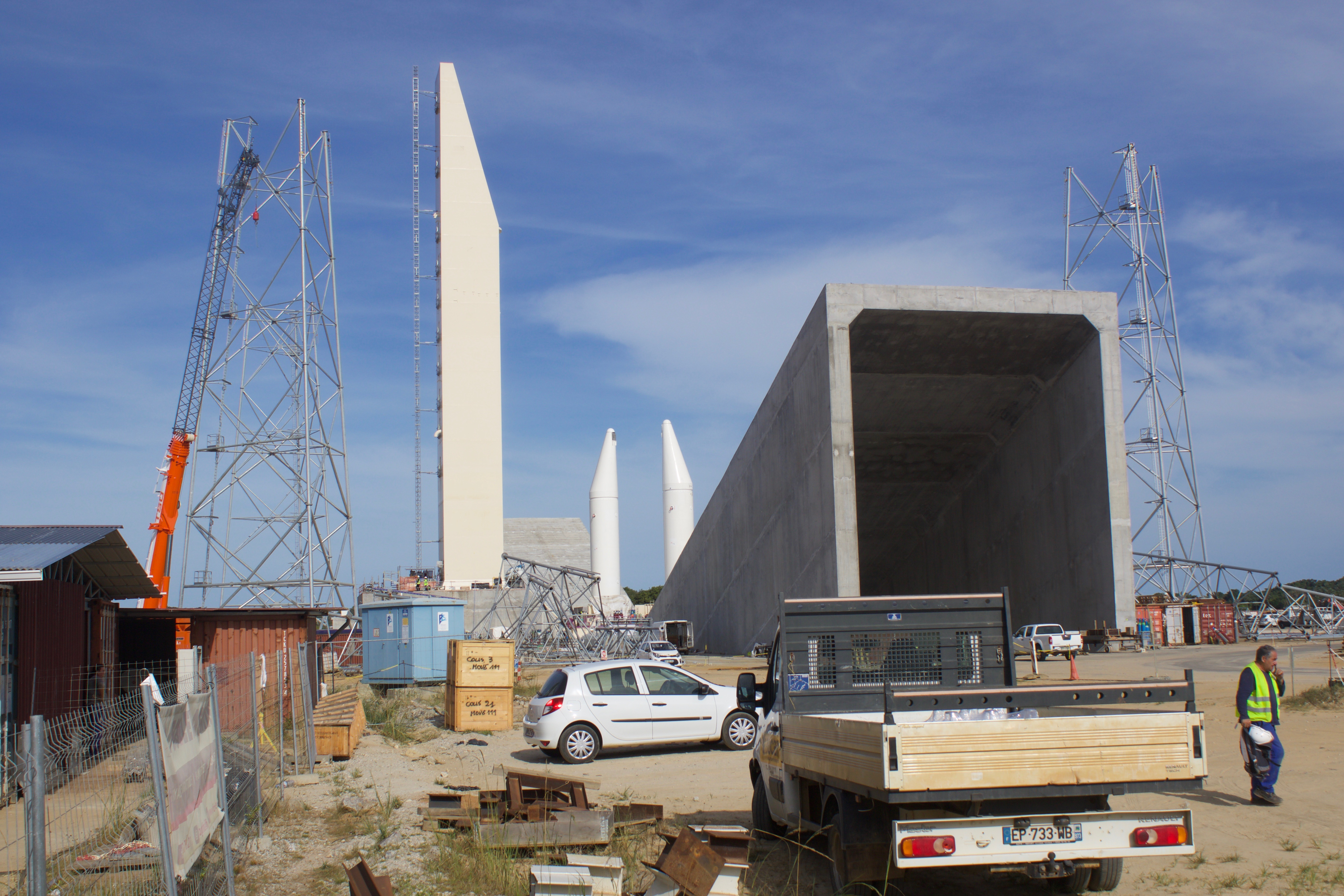
Closeup view of the pad's flame diverters in 2019
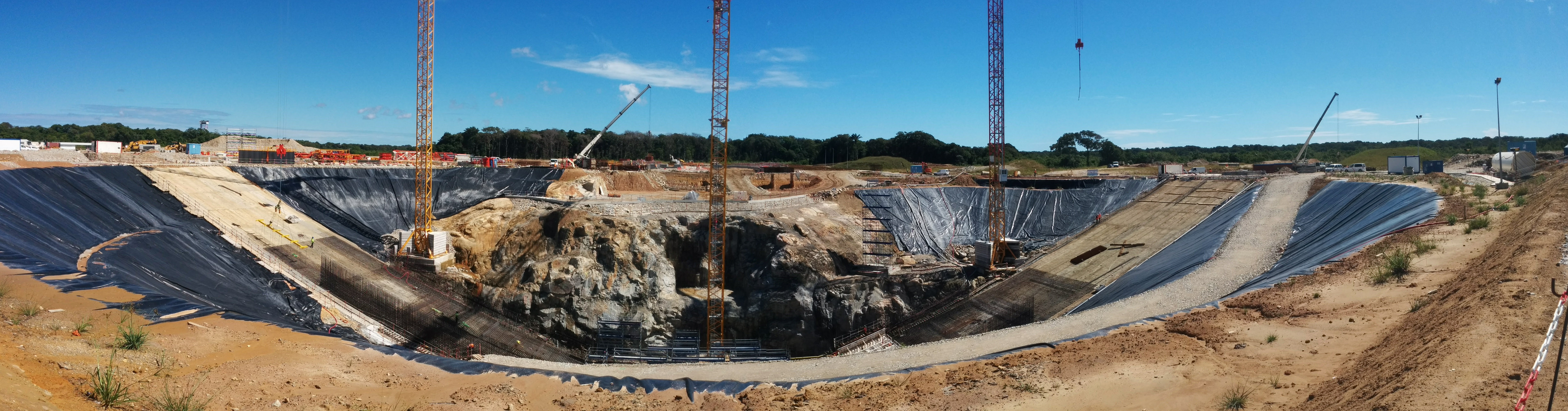
Panoramic view of ELA-4 construction in 2017

== See also ==
- Other Guiana Space Centre launch complexes:
  - ELA-1/ELV
  - ELA-2
  - ELA-3
  - ELS
