= Winged Reusable Sounding rocket =

Japanese winged single-stage reusable suborbital rocket

WIRES (WInged REusable Sounding rocket) is a Japanese project developing a winged single-stage reusable suborbital rocket as a test bed for a reusable orbital launch system or a crewed suborbital spaceplane. The full-size prototype, called WIRES-X, is expected to be launched in 2020.

== Overview ==
Since 2005, the Space Systems Laboratory at Kyushu Institute of Technology in Japan has been developing a reusable winged robotic suborbital test bed rocket called WIRES (WInged REusable Sounding rocket) meant as a research project towards a future fully reusable space launch system, or even a suborbital spaceplane. The project is a collaborative effort that includes JAXA, IHI Corporation, Japanese industry and universities, as well as the University of Texas at El Paso (UTEP), the University of Southern California (USC).

The series of suborbital rockets being developed are called WIRES 13, WIRES 15 and WIRES-X, and all of them use an engine burning alcohol and liquid oxygen fuel. The full sized WIRES-X variant is expected to be launched in 2020 to be evaluated for its possible use as a "recoverable first stage" of an orbital launch system, and in the long term, as a crewed suborbital spaceplane for commercial tours.

== Development ==
The concept builds on the original aerodynamic shape of HIMES (HIghly Maneuverable Experimental Sounding rocket) studied by the Institute of Space and Astronautical Science (ISAS, now part of the Japan Aerospace Exploration Agency) in the 1980s. The project is implementing a step-wise incremental size and complexity to its designs.

In late 2009, the Kyutech team completed the flight experiments of a small-scale (7.1 kg) experimental winged rocket called WIRES 11 that used solid rocket motors; it was launched five times to an altitude of 500 m. Then in 2010 they proceeded with the testing of slightly larger variants designated WIRES 12 (34.5 kg and 1.5 m long) to fly up to 1.1 km using a commercial hybrid rocket called HyperTEK M1000. The recovery system included a controllable parafoil and airbags.

The team then launched WIRES 14 (50 kg and 1.5 m length) in order to establish the efficacy of the body structure and new recovery system. WIRES 14 is a winged rocket propelled by a novel hybrid rocket engine called CAMUI (CAscaded MUltistage Impinging-jet) being developed by Hokkaido University.

As of late 2018, the WIRES project is studying and developing the aerodynamics, navigation, guidance control, composite structure, propulsion system, and cryogenic tanks for test models. The architecture timeline includes at least three more preliminary variants: a non-winged rocket called WIRES 13, and two winged rockets called WIRES 15 and Wires-X; the variant WIRES-X will be full-scale.

=== WIRES 13 ===
WIRES 13 is a sub-scale test rocket propelled by two IPA-LOX (isopropyl alcohol and liquid oxygen) engines generating a total combined thrust of 20 kN, that are under development by the University of Southern California (USC) to reach a target altitude of about 6 km (3.7 mi). The rocket has a length of 4.6 m (15 ft), and a mass of 1,000 kg (2,200 lb). WIRES 13 aims to touch down the ground without damage using two stage parachutes and three airbags. The flight objective is validation of the telemetry and ground communication system, recovery parachute system, and launch and operation of a liquid engine.

=== WIRES 15 ===
WIRES 15 has the same length and mass of WIRES 13; it is a sub-scale technology demonstrator propelled by a fully expander-cycle LOX-methane engine developed in collaboration with JAXA and IHI Corporation. It generates a thrust of 20 kN, and is targeted to reach an altitude of approximately 6 km. For this variant, Kyutech is collaborating with the University of Texas at El Paso (UTEP), JAXA and other institutions. WIRES 15 aims to touch down the ground without damage using two stage parachutes and three airbags.

The flight tests of both WIRES 13 and WIRES 15 will be conducted at the launch facility of FAR (Friends of Amateur Rocketry, Inc.) at the Mojave Desert in California, US, in May 2018 and March 2019 respectively.

=== WIRES-X ===
After completion of WIRES 13 and 15 flight tests, the suborbital full-size winged demonstrator called WIRES-X will be developed, and its first test flight is expected in 2020 to evaluate its resulting control and performance, expected to reach beyond 100 km (62 mi) altitude. It will also be evaluated for its potential to be used as the first stage of a two-stage-to-orbit launch vehicle.

WIRES-X has a total length of 8.2 m (27 ft), a launch mass of 4.6 tons, and a payload capability of 100 kg (220 lb). It will be propelled by three LOX-methane engines, each developing 20 kN-thrust.

=== Spaceplane ===
| Spaceplane | Parameter/units |
|---|---|
| Wet mass | 23.6 tons |
| Dry mass | 7.9 tons |
| Propellant mass | 15.7 tons (LOX-methane) |
| Capacity | 6 (1 pilot + 5 passengers) |
| Length | 13.4 m (44 ft) |
| No. of engines | 9 |
| Max. altitude | 120 km (75 mi) |

If WIRES development is successful, the project engineers envision an additional application of the system as a suborbital crewed spaceplane for space tourism. The notional specifications of the vehicle are shown in the table.

=== Space Walker ===
Koichi Yonemoto, who was responsible of the development at Kyushu Institute of Technology, co-founded a company Space Walker in 2017. Since Yonemoto transferred from Kyutech to Tokyo University of Science (TUS) in 2019, WIRES is being developed by Space Walker and TUS. As of 2020, Space Walker aims to launch suborbital uncrewed spaceplane in 2024, orbital launch of small satellites in 2026, and suborbital crewed spaceplane in 2029.

A sub-scale model WIRES#014-3A was launched on 17 March 2020.

However, Space Walker went bankrupt in January 2026, and none of the planned spaceplane launches were realized.

== See also ==
- Adeline (rocket stage), reusable winged first stage
- Reusable launch system
