= P160C =

Solid-fuel first-stage rocket motor

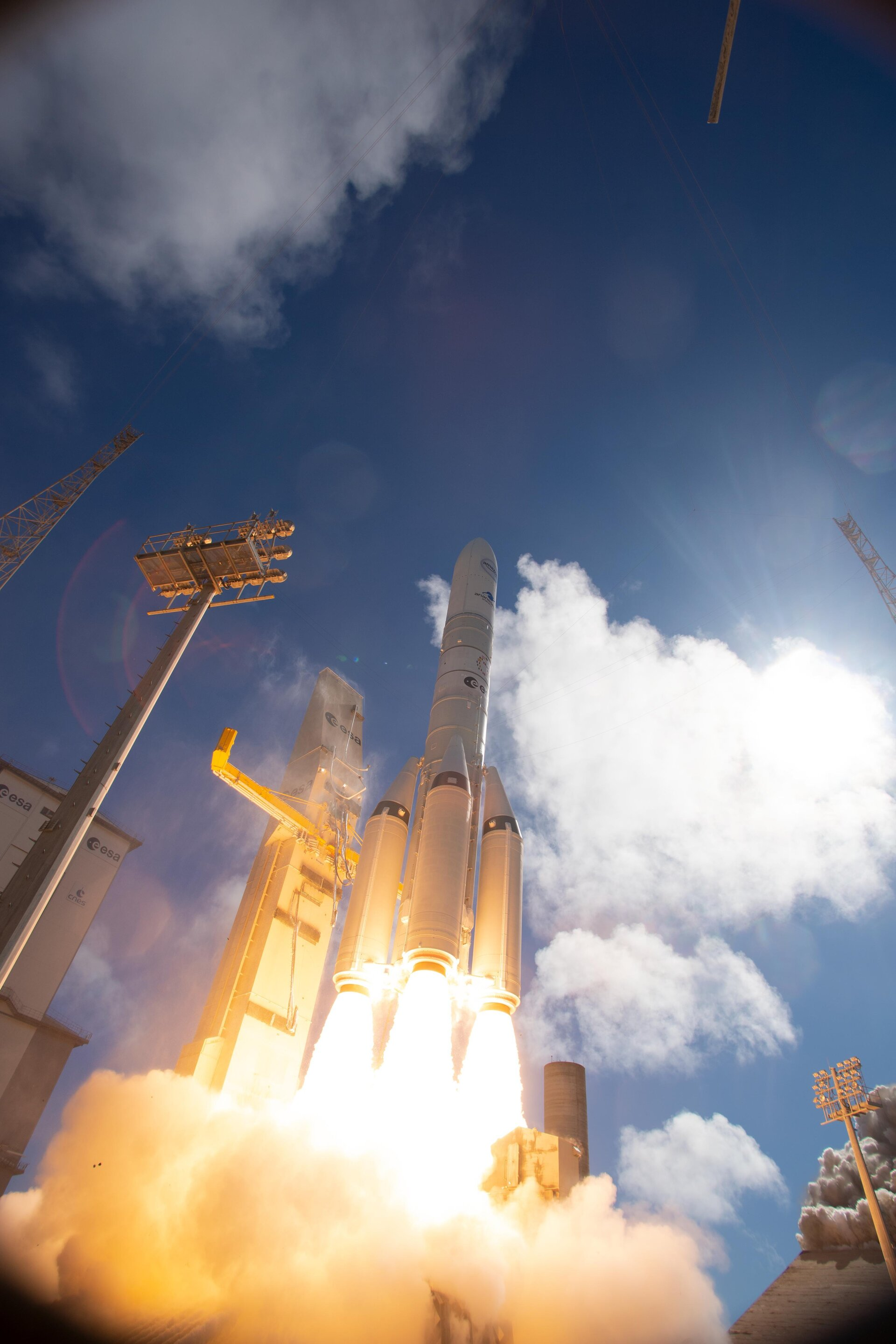
- Ariane 6 lifted off from Europe's spaceport in Kourou, French Guiana with new P160C boosters.
- Manufacturer: Europropulsion
- Country of origin: Italy; France
- Used on: Ariane 6 (Block 2); Vega C+; Vega E
- Derived from: P120C

Launch history
- Status: Active
- Total launches: 1
- Successes (stage only): 1
- First flight: 17 June 2026

Technical details
- Height: 14.5 m (47 ft 7 in)
- Diameter: 3.4 m (11 ft 2 in)
- Gross mass: 167,000 kg (368,000 lb)
- Propellant mass: 155,600 kg (343,000 lb)
- Maximum thrust: 4,780 kN (1,070,000 lb_{f})
- Specific impulse: 278.5 s (2.731 km/s)
- Burn time: 137 seconds
- Propellant: HTPB / AP / Al

The P160C is a solid-fuel rocket motor developed for use as the first stage of the Vega C+ mid-life upgrade, the next-generation Vega E, and as strap-on boosters for the Ariane 6 Block 2 launch vehicles. It was developed by Europropulsion, a joint venture between Avio and ArianeGroup, for the European Space Agency (ESA). The designation "P160C" reflects key characteristics of the motor: "P" stands for poudre (French for 'powder'), referring to its solid propellant; "160" denotes the original target of 160 tonnes of propellant; and "C" signifies its common use across multiple launch systems.

The motor was developed largely in response to the increased lift performance requirements of Project Kuiper, Amazon's satellite internet constellation. Compared to its predecessor, the P120C, the P160C adds an additional 14 tonnes (31,000 lb) of solid propellant and is 1 metre (3 ft 3 in) taller. The motor's casing is constructed as a single-piece carbon-fibre composite shell, making it one of the most powerful monolithic solid rocket motors in production worldwide.

== History ==
In 2022, development began on the P120C+ variant, which evolved into the P160C. This extended version adds 1 metre (3 ft 3 in) to the motor's length and an additional 14,000 kilograms (31,000 lb) of propellant, translating to an approximate 2,000 kilograms (4,400 lb) improvement in lift performance on the Ariane 64 with four boosters.

This extended version was developed in part to meet the lift performance needs of Amazon's Project Kuiper, a broadband satellite constellation. Of the 18 Ariane 6 launches contracted for Kuiper, 16 are expected to use the P160C, totaling 64 booster units—four per launch. This commercial demand provided the business case for developing the upgraded variant.

While the P160C significantly improves performance, Ariane 64 will carry fewer Kuiper satellites per launch than some competing rockets. With the upgraded boosters, it is expected to deliver 35–40 satellites per mission. This compares to 61 aboard Blue Origin's New Glenn and 45 on United Launch Alliance’s Vulcan Centaur. However, it exceeds the 24 lofted by Falcon 9 and the 27 carried by Atlas V, which is being phased out.

In June 2024, the first P160C motor case was shipped to the Guiana Space Centre in Kourou, French Guiana, in preparation for fueling and static fire tests.

On 24 April 2025, ESA conducted the first hot-fire test of the P160C solid-fuel booster using Qualification Model 3 (QM3) on the solid-propellant booster test stand at the Guiana Space Centre, operated by CNES, the French space agency. The motor fired for over two minutes, delivering a maximum thrust of approximately 4,700 kilonewtons (1,100,000 lb_{f}), and expended its full propellant load under simulated flight conditions. Preliminary data indicated nominal performance with no anomalies observed. A full post-test analysis will support final qualification.

The European Space Agency completed the qualification review of the P160C booster upgrade in December 2025, clearing it for full operational use for Ariane 6 and Vega C+.

== Ariane 6 ==
To support the use of these more powerful rockets, CNES is assisting in modifying the existing Ariane 6 launch pad. The first Ariane 6 launch with the P160C was conducted on 17 June 2026 in the Ariane 64 configuration.

== Vega C+ ==
Significant funding was announced in November 2025 to increase capacity for Vega C+ launches. The first launch is scheduled for Q1 2028 as part of the Space Rider mission.

== See also ==
- P80 (rocket stage)
- Zefiro (rocket stage)
- Solid rocket
- Vega (rocket)
