= Amazon Leo =

Amazon satellite constellation and internet service

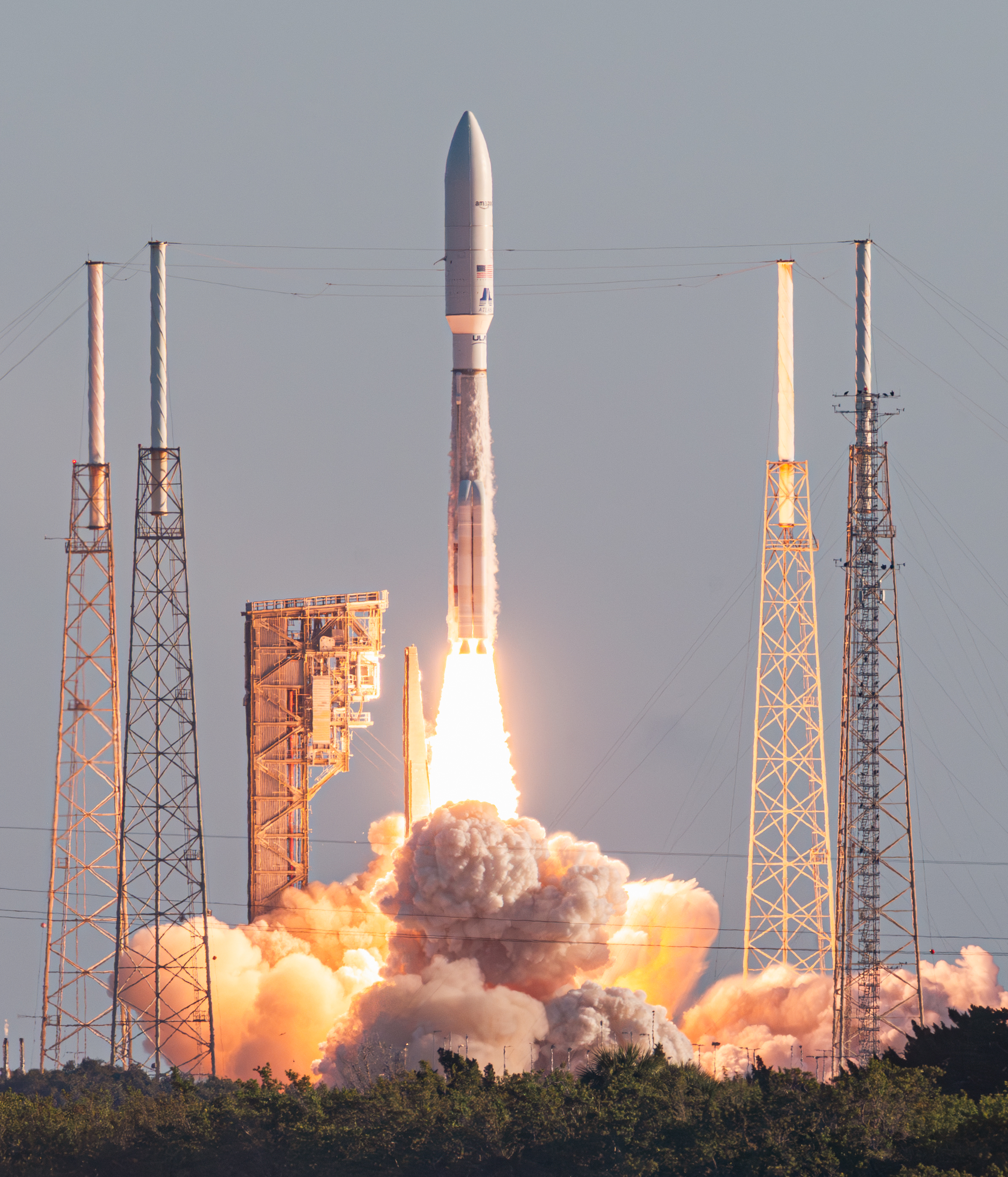
- An Atlas V launching the KA-03 mission in September 2025, carrying 27 satellites into low Earth orbit.
- Formerly: Project Kuiper (2019–2025)
- Type: Satellite Internet provider
- Founded: April 2019; 7 years ago
- Founder: Jeff Bezos
- Headquarters: Redmond, Washington, U.S.
- Area served: Worldwide
- Key people: Rajeev Badyal (president)
- Number of employees: 1,400 (July 2023)
- Parent: Amazon
- Website: leo.amazon.com

Amazon Leo is a subsidiary of Amazon established in 2019 to deploy a large satellite Internet constellation providing low-latency broadband connectivity. The project's original codename, Project Kuiper, was inspired by the Kuiper belt. The service was rebranded as Amazon Leo in November 2025.

In July 2020, the Federal Communications Commission authorized Amazon to deploy 3,236 satellites into low Earth orbit (LEO). Deployment is planned in five phases, with service expected to begin after the first 578 satellites reach orbit. Under the original terms of its license, Amazon must launch and operate half of the constellation by July 30, 2026, and the remainder by July 30, 2029. However, the FCC waived the July 2026 deadline in early June 2026.

To support the constellation, Amazon has purchased 92 rocket launches from United Launch Alliance, ArianeGroup, and Blue Origin—the latter founded by Amazon executive chairman Jeff Bezos—for a total cost exceeding US$10 billion. In 2023, it also purchased three launches from SpaceX, operator of the competing Starlink network.

As of July 2026, Amazon Leo has launched 396 production satellites.

== History ==
=== Founding to prototype launch ===
In April 2019, Amazon officials announced that they would fund and deploy Project Kuiper, a large satellite constellation, to provide broadband Internet service. Officials said the project would "offer broadband service through partnerships with other companies", including to "tens of millions of people who lack basic access to broadband Internet", although it remains unclear whether service will be offered directly to consumers.

The president of Kuiper Systems, Rajeev Badyal, was a former vice president of SpaceX's Starlink satellite Internet constellation. Fired by Elon Musk in 2018, Badyal soon afterward started Kuiper along with other ex-SpaceX employees.

In December 2019, it was reported that Amazon was asking the FCC to waive requirements (e.g., to have applied by 2016) that SpaceX and OneWeb had to follow in order to get their large satellite Internet constellations licensed.

In July 2020, Amazon received FCC authorization to orbit a constellation of 3,236 satellites, provided, among other conditions, that they not interfere with previously authorized satellite ventures. Company officials said they would spend $10 billion on the effort. It was expected to take up to a decade to fully deploy all 3,236 planned satellites.

In December 2020, Amazon unveiled a low-cost flat-panel user terminal antenna for the Project Kuiper system. It is a Ka-band phased-array antenna that is much smaller than traditional designs for antennas that operate at 17–30 GHz. The antenna will be ~30 cm (12 in) in width and is expected to support up to 400 megabits per second of data bandwidth at less than 20% of the cost of traditional state-of-the-art flat-panel antennas. Amazon also announced that they intend to be "launch agnostic" and would not plan to exclusively use launch capacity from Jeff Bezos' Blue Origin company, but rather were open to launch capability offers from all providers.

In April 2021, Amazon announced that it had contracted with ULA for nine launches of Kuiper satellites on Atlas V launch vehicles from Cape Canaveral Space Force Station in Florida, and noted that it will "continue to explore all options" for launching the remainder of the satellites.

In April 2022, Amazon announced contracts with three launch providers for 83 launches over the next decade. They include 18 launches of the European Ariane 6, 12 launches of Blue Origin's New Glenn (with options for 15 additional flights), and 38 launches on the Vulcan launch vehicle from United Launch Alliance.

In August 2023, a lawsuit was filed by an Amazon shareholder, Cleveland Bakers and Teamsters Pension Fund, against the company claiming the Amazon board of directors acted in bad faith when procuring the approximately $10 billion in launch contracts for the constellation, which amounted to Amazon's second-largest capital expenditure to date. Contracts to Blue Origin, owned by Bezos, amounted to 45% of the total expenditure. The suit suggests that animosity between Bezos and SpaceX founder Elon Musk may have precluded Amazon from contracting SpaceX's Falcon 9 vehicle, which is flight proven and potentially more cost-effective.

Two initial prototype satellites, "KuiperSat-1" and "KuiperSat-2" launched on October 6, 2023, on an Atlas V rocket operated by United Launch Alliance from Cape Canaveral Space Force Station. The mission was deemed a success and both satellites were deorbited.

=== Post prototype launch ===
In December 2023, it was announced that Amazon had secured three Kuiper launches aboard SpaceX's Falcon 9. These flew in July, August and October 2025, carrying 24 satellites each.

The Vulcan Centaur rocket launched for the first time on January 8, 2024, clearing the way for the future ordered launches of Kuiper Systems satellites. Ariane 6 made its maiden flight on July 9, 2024.

The first 27 production satellites were launched on April 28, 2025, aboard an Atlas V rocket. The company said that it had successfully established communications with all of the satellites.

On November 12, 2025, Amazon announced that Project Kuiper would get rebranded as Amazon Leo, with a public beta waitlist also being revealed. Early service is anticipated in 2026.

In January 2026, Amazon filed a request with the FCC to extend the deadline to launch half of their first generation constellation by July 2026. It disclosed that it had purchased 10 additional Falcon 9 and 12 additional New Glenn launches. In June 2026, the FCC waived the deadline for launching half of the constellation, but will be "temporarily demoting the spectral priority of satellites launched after the relevant July 2026 milestone deadline, until and unless Amazon Leo builds those satellites at a faster pace" to encourage Amazon to deploy the constellation as rapidly as possible.

In April 2026, Amazon announced an agreement to acquire Globalstar, with the acquisition intended to close in 2027.

In July 2026, Amazon Leo signed an agreement with South African Internet service provider Herotel to introduce its first satellite-Internet service in Africa. Herotel planned to use the constellation to offer a residential broadband service named evry, with commercial availability expected in South Africa in 2027. The service was intended principally for rural communities and smaller towns beyond the economical reach of conventional fibre and wireless networks.

On September 10, 2026, Amazon announced it had an additional 6 launches from Arianespace, increasing the total number of Leo missions aboard Ariane 6 from 18 to 24.

== Technology ==
=== Satellite constellation ===
As of July 2026, Amazon Leo has launched two prototype satellites and 396 production satellites. (Note: The two prototype satellites and first 153 production satellites were under the Project Kuiper name.)

Amazon Leo's satellite constellation is planned to consist of 3,236 satellites operating in 98 orbital planes in three orbital shells, one each at 590 km (370 mi), 610 km (380 mi), and 630 km (390 mi) orbital altitude. The satellites are equipped with Hall-effect thruster technology. Phase 1 of deployment will be 578 satellites at 630 km altitude and an orbital inclination of 51.9 degrees. A total of five phases of constellation development are planned.

Amazon Leo is planned to work in concert with Amazon's previously announced large network of 12 satellite ground station facilities (the "AWS Ground Station unit") announced in November 2018.

In addition to connecting to ground stations to connect to the ground-based Internet, satellites will interconnect via optical infrared laser connections. Amazon refers to this technology as OISL (optical inter-satellite link). These lasers are capable of maintaining 100 Gbps over distances up to 2,600 km among two satellites moving at 25,000 km/h. Current in-space tests have demonstrated this speed up to a distance of 1,000 km.

=== User terminals ===
Three customer terminal (CT) designs are planned for different market needs.

An Amazon Leo Nano CT measures 7 inches square and weighs 2.2 lb, and is intended to deliver up to 100 Mbps to residential and mobility customers. Leo Pro, the standard CT, is 11 inches square and weighs 5.3 lb, and is designed to deliver 400 Mbps. The Leo Ultra terminal is 20x30 inches and advertised to deliver up to 1 Gbps download and 400 Mbps upload. Multiple Ultra terminals can be ganged together for applications requiring higher bandwidth.

== Facilities ==
Organizational headquarters for Amazon Leo are located at an Amazon R&D facility in Redmond, Washington since 2020. Development of satellite prototypes and production methods were initially performed at the Redmond site. Manufacturing and satellite production is located at 172,000 square feet (16,000 m^{2}) facility in nearby Kirkland, Washington. The factory in Kirkland opened in April 2024 and is planned to manufacture five satellites per day at peak capacity. A logistics center in Everett, Washington, is expected to open in June 2024 to supply the Kirkland factory with kits assembled from raw materials.

Amazon owns a satellite processing and integration facility in Florida at NASA's Kennedy Space Center to integrate spacecraft for launch aboard United Launch Alliance, SpaceX and Blue Origin rockets from the spaceport.

== Launch history ==
No.	Launch (UTC)	Vehicle (Flight)	Mission	Number of satellites	Deployment orbit	Operational orbit	Launch site	Launch status
1	October 6, 2023; 18:06	Atlas V 501 (AV-104)	Protoflight	2	LEO, 500 km, 30°	LEO, 500 km, 30°	Cape Canaveral, SLC‑41	Success
1	First of nine Atlas V launches. The launch carried two prototype satellites, named KuiperSat-1 & 2.							
2	April 28, 2025; 23:01	Atlas V 551 (AV-107)	KA-01	27	LEO, 450 km, 51.9°	LEO, 630 km, 51.9°	Cape Canaveral, SLC‑41	Success
2	First launch of production satellites.							
3	June 23, 2025; 10:54	Atlas V 551 (AV-105)	KA-02	27	LEO, 450 km, 51.9°	LEO, 630 km, 51.9°	Cape Canaveral, SLC‑41	Success
4	July 16, 2025; 06:30	Falcon 9 Block 5 (F9-504)	KF-01	24	LEO, 465 km, 51.9°	LEO, 630 km, 51.9°	Cape Canaveral, SLC‑40	Success
4	First of a three launch batch on Falcon 9, purchased in 2023.							
5	August 11, 2025; 12:35	Falcon 9 Block 5 (F9-514)	KF-02	24	LEO, 465 km, 51.9°	LEO, 630 km, 51.9°	Cape Canaveral, SLC‑40	Success
6	September 25, 2025; 12:09	Atlas V 551 (AV-108)	KA-03	27	LEO, 450 km, 51.9°	LEO, 630 km, 51.9°	Cape Canaveral, SLC‑41	Success
7	October 14, 2025; 01:58	Falcon 9 Block 5 (F9-545)	KF-03	24	LEO, 465 km, 51.9°	LEO, 630 km, 51.9°	Cape Canaveral, SLC‑40	Success
8	December 16, 2025; 08:28	Atlas V 551 (AV-111)	LA-04	27	LEO, 450 km, 51.9°	LEO, 630 km, 51.9°	Cape Canaveral, SLC‑41	Success
8	First launch following the November 2025 rebranding from Project Kuiper to Amazon Leo.							
9	February 12, 2026; 16:45	Ariane 64 Block 1 (VA267)	LE-01	32	LEO, 465 km, 51.9°	LEO, 630 km, 51.9°	Guiana, ELA‑4	Success
9	First of 18 launches on Ariane 6.							
10	April 4, 2026; 05:46	Atlas V 551 (AV-109)	LA-05	29	LEO, 450 km, 51.9°	LEO, 630 km, 51.9°	Cape Canaveral, SLC‑41	Success
10	First launch of 29 (from 27) satellites on Atlas V, enabled by an upgraded RL-10C engine on the Centaur upper stage.							
11	April 28, 2026; 00:53	Atlas V 551 (AV-112)	LA-06	29	LEO, 450 km, 51.9°	LEO, 630 km, 51.9°	Cape Canaveral, SLC‑41	Success
12	April 30, 2026; 08:57	Ariane 64 Block 1 (VA268)	LE-02	32	LEO, 465 km, 51.9°	LEO, 630 km, 51.9°	Guiana, ELA‑4	Success
13	May 29, 2026; 23:53	Atlas V 551 (AV-113)	LA-07	29	LEO, 450 km, 51.9°	LEO, 630 km, 51.9°	Cape Canaveral, SLC‑41	Success
14	June 17, 2026; 12:21	Ariane 64 Block 2 (VA269)	LE-03	36	LEO, 465 km, 51.9°	LEO, 630 km, 51.9°	Guiana, ELA‑4	Success
14	First launch of 36 (from 32) satellites on Ariane 6, made possible by Ariane 64 Block 2 utilizing longer-burning P160C boosters in place of the current P120C.							
15	July 2, 2026; 04:30	Atlas V 551 (AV-114)	LA-08	29	LEO, 450 km, 51.9°	LEO, 630 km, 51.9°	Cape Canaveral, SLC‑41	Success
15	Last of nine launches on Atlas V.							

== See also ==
- Satellite Internet access
- Satellite Internet constellation
  - Bureau 1440 – Russian satellite internet constellation
  - Guowang – Chinese satellite internet constellation
  - Qianfan – Chinese satellite internet constellation
  - Starlink – SpaceX satellite Internet constellation
