= P80 (rocket stage) =

Solid-fuel first-stage used on the European Vega rocket

P80FW
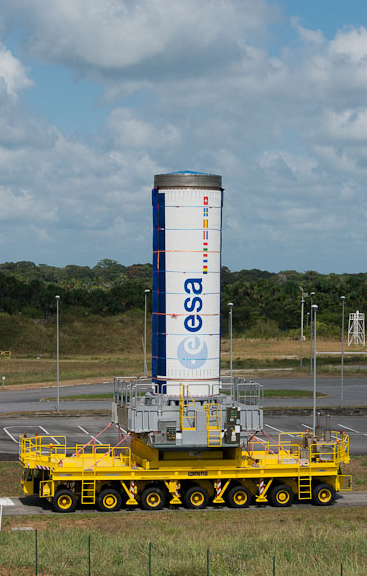
- P80 being transferred at Guiana Space Centre
- Manufacturer: Europropulsion
- Country of origin: Italy; France
- Used on: Vega

Associated stages
- Derivatives: P120C

Launch history
- Status: Retired
- Total launches: 22
- Successes (stage only): 22
- First flight: 13 February 2012
- Last flight: 5 September 2024

Technical details
- Height: 10.8 m (35 ft 5 in)
- Diameter: 3 m (9 ft 10 in)
- Empty mass: 7,330 kg (16,160 lb)
- Gross mass: 95,021 kg (209,485 lb)
- Propellant mass: 88,365 kg (194,811 lb)
- Maximum thrust: 3,015 kN (678,000 lb_{f})
- Specific impulse: 280 s (2.7 km/s)
- Burn time: 110 seconds
- Propellant: HTPB / AP / Al

The P80FW is a retired solid-fuel rocket motor developed as the first stage of the Vega launch vehicle. It was developed by Europropulsion, a joint venture between Avio and ArianeGroup, for the European Space Agency (ESA). The designation "P80FW" reflects the key characteristics of the motor: "P" stands for poudre (French for 'powder'), referencing its solid propellant; "80" denotes the original target of 80 tonnes of propellant (later increased to 88 tonnes); and "FW" for filament wound, indicating the one-piece carbon-fibre composite construction of the motor casing. Prior to its retirement, it was the world's most powerful monolithic solid rocket motor.

== History ==
Development of the P80 began in 2005 led by the French space agency CNES, in collaboration with the ESA and the Italian Space Agency (ASI). The first static firing test was conducted at the Guiana Space Centre in November 2006, followed by qualification testing in December 2007. The P80 made its maiden flight on 13 February 2012 as part of Vega's qualification mission, followed by its first commercial launch on 7 May 2013. Total development costs amounted to €76 million.

The P80 was retired after completing 22 successful launches, with its final flight occurring on 5 September 2024.

It was succeeded by the P120C, a wider and more powerful variant with a propellant mass of 141,634 kg (312,250 lb), developed for use on both the Ariane 6 launch vehicle and the upgraded Vega C rocket.

As of 2024, an extended version of the P120C, known as the P160C, was under development. This version is approximately 1 metre (3 ft 3 in) longer and features a propellant mass of 155,634 kg (343,114 lb). It is intended for use on the Ariane 6 Block 2 and as the first stage of the future Vega E.

== Technical overview ==
The P80FW was a monolithic solid rocket motor that used an ammonium perchlorate composite propellant known as HTPB 1912, consisting of approximately 69% ammonium perchlorate, 19% aluminum powder, and 12% hydroxyl-terminated polybutadiene (HTPB) as the binder. It burned for approximately 114 seconds and was jettisoned at an altitude of 60 kilometres (37 mi), at which point the launch vehicle reached a velocity of about 1.7 kilometres per second (6,100 km/h; 3,800 mph).

The motor shared dimensions with the solid rocket boosters used on the Ariane 5, featuring a 3-metre (9 ft 10 in) diameter and a similar height of 11.714 metres (38 ft 5.2 in). This compatibility allowed use of the same facilities at the Guiana Space Centre propellant loading and transportation. The P80 nozzle was derived from that of the Ariane 5 boosters.

When fully fueled, the P80FW had a gross mass of 95,000 kilograms (209,000 lb) including approximately 88,365 kg (194,811 lb) of propellant. Before propellant loading, the booster weighed approximately 7,330 kg (16,160 lb), which includes the 3,260 kg (7,190 lb) weight of the motor casing. It delivered a maximum thrust of 3,015 kilonewtons (678,000 lb_{f}) and an average thrust of 2,200 kilonewtons (490,000 lb_{f}) with a specific impulse of 280 seconds (2.7 km/s).

Manufacturing and integration of the P80 involved multiple European aerospace companies. Europropulsion (a 50-50 joint venture of Avio and ArianeGroup) manufactured the main motor casing, Regulus (a 60-40 joint venture of Avio and ArianeGroup) was responsible for propellant loading, Aerospace Propulsion Products of the Netherlands built the igniter, Belgian company SABCA supplied components for thrust vector control and the staging skirt, ArianeGroup manufactured the nozzle and Avio handled integration of all the components and conducted final testing.
