= Ariane flight VA262 =

Maiden flight of the Ariane 6 rocket family

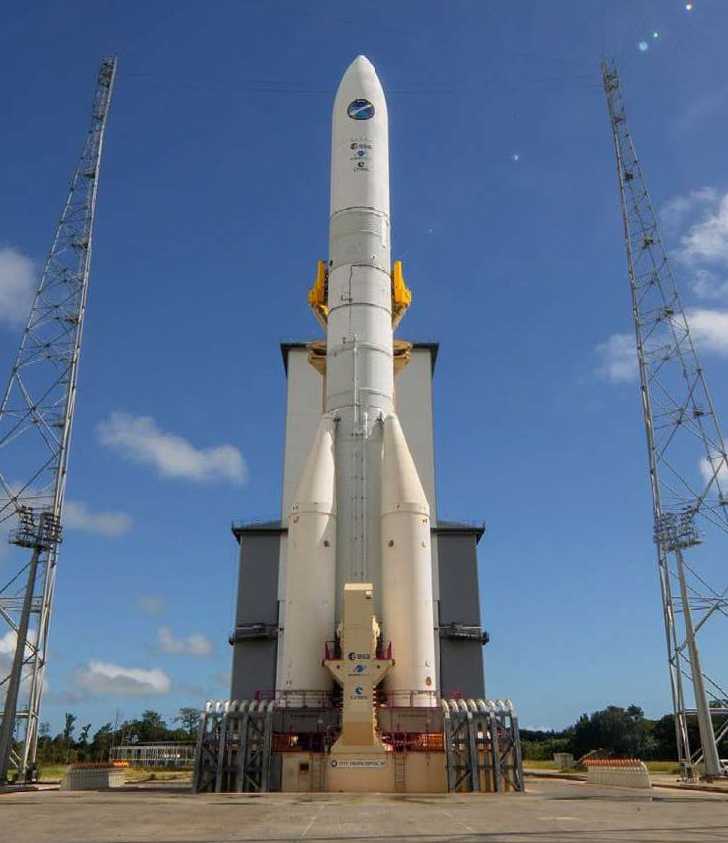
- Ariane 64 during testing at the Guiana Space Centre

Ariane 62 launch
- Launch: 9 July 2024
- Operator: Arianespace
- Pad: ELA-4
- Payload: GRBBeta, ROBUSTA-3A, ISTSat-1, OOV-Cube, ³Cat-4, Curium One, boilerplate
- Outcome: Partial failure
- Apogee: 580 km (360 mi)
- Launch duration: 75 minutes

Components
- Serial no.: L6001
- Boosters: 2 × P120C

Ariane launches

Ariane flight VA262 was the maiden flight of the Ariane 6, carrying a 1,600-kilogram (3,500 lb) payload, consisting of a mass simulator, plus a number of small CubeSats and other experiments as rideshare payloads.

== Mission ==
The launch experienced a one-hour delay due to a data acquisition system issue. Despite this, the countdown resumed smoothly, and the rocket lifted off successfully at 19:00 UTC, flying a northeastern trajectory that took it over Europe. During the initial launch, the initial stages, including the two P120C solid rocket boosters and core stage, performed as expected. The upper stage ignited at the T+8-minute mark and performed a ten-minute burn to establish a preliminary orbit. Following a coasting phase, the upper stage reignited at T+56 minutes for a successful 22-second burn, placing it in a circular orbit. Cubesats were deployed according to schedule at this point. However, during the mission's final phase, the auxiliary propulsion system (APU) malfunctioned at T+1 hour and 14 minutes.

The APU performs two critical functions in the re-ignition of the upper stage's Vinci engine. First, the APU heats up small amounts of propellant inside a 3D-printed gas generator and the gas created in this way is injected back into the tanks to re-pressurize them. Secondly, the APU can produce a low level of thrust, to either settle floating propellant in the tanks before re-ignition of the Vinci engine or to make fine orbital adjustments (similar to a thruster).

The failure of the APU prevented the planned third burn at T+2 hours and 37 minutes. The third burn was considered an important test for future Ariane 6 missions and as part of ESA's efforts to leave zero launch debris in space.

The plan was for this third burn to direct the upper stage into a safe deorbit over the Pacific Ocean and release the two reentry capsule experiments. The failure left the upper stage stranded in a 580-kilometre (360 mi) circular orbit. At this altitude, their natural orbital decay due to atmospheric drag is expected to take decades.

== Payload ==
The payload was primarily a mass simulator but carried multiple rideshare payloads. They include five experiments (PariSat by GAREF, Peregrinus by Sint-Pieterscollege, LIFI by OLEDCOMM, SIDLOC by Libre Space and YPSat by ESA) and eight CubeSats (OOV-Cube by RapidCube, Curium One by PTS, ISTSat by University of Lisbon, 3Cat-4 by Polytechnic University of Catalonia, GRBBeta by Spacemanic, ROBUSTA-3 by University of Montpellier, CURIE by NASA and Replicator by Orbital Matter), which were deployed correctly. The launch also carried two reentry capsules (SpaceCase SC-X01 by ArianeGroup and Nyx Bikini by The Exploration Company) that were slated to be deployed after the second stage was to be deorbited, but the vehicle did not make reentry as planned.

== See also ==
- List of Ariane launches
