= Tiba 1 =

Egyptian geostationary communications satellite

TIBA-1
- Mission type: Communications
- Operator: Government of Egypt
- COSPAR ID: 2019-080A
- SATCAT no.: 44800
- Website: http://www.ncts.com.eg/ncts/tiba-1.php
- Mission duration: 15 years (planned); 6 years, 11 months, 21 days (elapsed)

Spacecraft properties
- Spacecraft type: Eurostar
- Bus: Eurostar-3000EOR
- Manufacturer: Airbus Defence and Space, Thales Alenia Space
- Payload mass: 5,640 kg (12,430 lb)
- Power: 9 kW

Start of mission
- Launch date: 26 November 2019, 21:23 UTC
- Rocket: Ariane 5 ECA, VA250
- Launch site: Guiana Space Centre, ELA-3
- Contractor: Arianespace
- Entered service: 26 November 2019

Orbital parameters
- Reference system: Geocentric orbit
- Regime: Geostationary orbit
- Longitude: 35.5° East

Transponders
- Band: Ka-band
- Coverage area: North Africa, Middle East

Tiba 1 is a communication satellite for the Egyptian government that was launched in 2019.

== Mission ==
Launch of Ariane 5 with Tiba 1

Tiba 1 was built in Toulouse by Airbus Defence and Space and Thales Alenia Space. Both companies had been selected by the Egyptian government. The satellite was transported from Toulouse to Kourou, French Guiana, on October 16, 2019. The satellite was launched on November 26, 2019 on board an Ariane 5 rocket from Guiana Space Centre along with Inmarsat-5 F5 into a geostationary transfer orbit. Several months later, it reached its geostationary position at 35.5° East. Since then, Tiba 1 transmits both civilian and military broadcasts to Egypt.

Ariane flight VA250 marked the 250th launch of an Ariane rocket and the last flight of the Ariane 5 ECA variant. It was replaced by the Ariane 5 ECA+ version.

== Technical data ==
Arianespace presentation video on Tiba 1

The satellite uses a Eurostar 3000 satellite bus built by Airbus Defence and Space. It uses Ka-band transponders and is powered by two large solar panels and batteries. The spacecraft is stabilized three-axis and has a planned lifespan of 15 years.
