= Electra (satellite) =

European satellite development project

Electra is a satellite development project initiated by the European Space Agency (ESA) as the first partnership project under its ARTES-33 programme. In conjunction with satellite operator SES and satellite builder OHB Systems, the Electra project seeks to develop, launch and validate in orbit an electric-only propulsion platform for geostationary communications satellites of below 3 tonnes launch mass. Electra encompasses both a coordinated effort to develop a European full electric propulsion small geostationary satellite, and the implementation of a mission by SES providing flight heritage and in-orbit demonstration of the platform to gain market acceptance for the product. At the time the project was initialised, it was expected that the first of these spacecraft would be launched as an SES craft by the end of 2018. However, delays to the project have meant that the inaugural flight has been pushed to 2023. As of 2026, the satellite has'not launched yet.

== Background ==
While electric engines have been fitted in recent years to scientific spacecraft and to communications satellites for station-keeping, there is a benefit to extending this use of electric propulsion to raising a satellite from its initial orbit after launch to its final intended geostationary orbit, a task currently usually undertaken by chemical rocket engines.

ESA's Artemis satellite was Europe's first experimental use of electric thrusters to raise a satellite to its target orbit. Artemis proved that electric thrusters are capable of performing the same task as conventional chemical propulsion but with up to 90% savings in fuel consumption. The Electra satellite will offer power consumption and communication capabilities equal to those offered by larger mid-size satellites while keeping the launch mass low enough for small launcher vehicles, or be used with a larger payload for the same launch mass, in both cases producing significant economic benefits.

== History ==
The Electra project was decided in November 2012 during a conference of ESA government ministers. In October 2013, ESA, SES and OHB signed a first private public partnership agreement for an initial one-year contract to define and develop the Electra platform. Magali Vaissiere, ESA's Director of Telecommunication and Integrated Applications said of the agreement, "Electra is the first example of our Partner programme, where we are consolidating the model of partnerships with the private sector to help the introduction and adoption of innovative efficient solutions proposed by our industry".

In March 2016, ESA, SES and OHB signed the contract to produce the Electra satellite platform. Some six years behind schedule, largely because of delays to OHB's SmallGEO platform on which Electra is based, the launch of the first Electra satellite was then expected to be in 2023. The Electra satellite is intended to fill a lightweight gap in the all-electric satellite products now offered by builders of larger craft.

== See also ==
- ESA
- SES S.A.
- OHB Systems
