= MTG-I2 =

European weather satellite

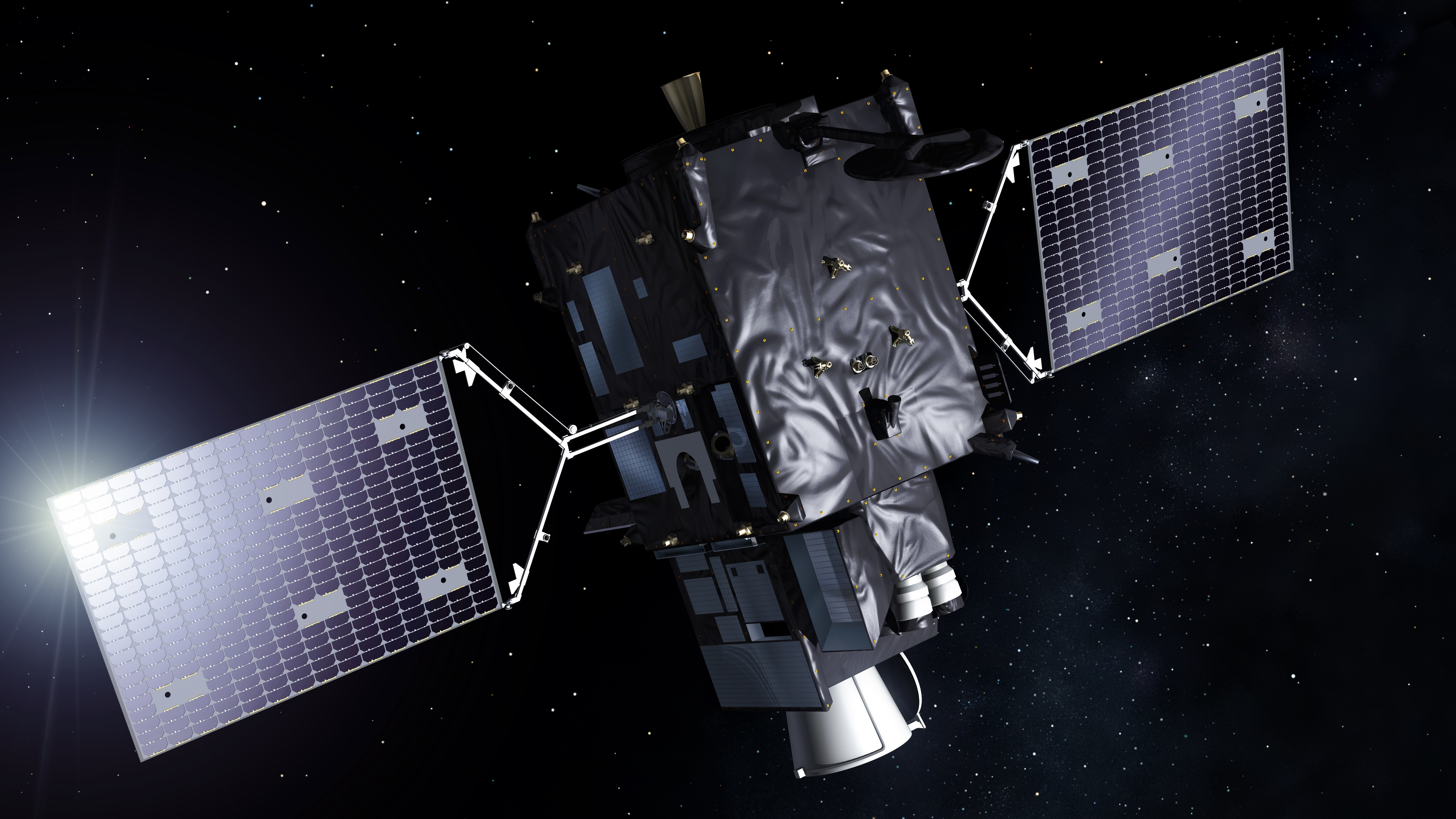
- Names: Meteosat-14
- Mission type: Meteorology
- Operator: EUMETSAT
- Website: MTG (EUMETSAT)
- Mission duration: 1 day (elapsed)

Start of mission
- Launch date: 27 August 2026, 20:11 UTC
- Rocket: Ariane 62
- Contractor: Arianespace

Orbital parameters
- Reference system: Geocentric
- Regime: Geosynchronous

MTG-I2, also known as Meteosat-14, is a European geostationary satellite, part of the Meteosat Third Generation (MTG) system of weather satellites developed by EUMETSAT in cooperation with the European Space Agency (ESA). It is the second of four imaging satellites of MTG, completing its first trio together with MTG-I1 and MTG-S1/Sentinel-4A. It will provide high resolution imagery over Europe every 2.5 minutes from a position at 9.5 degrees East—in line with Germany and Sardinia. It was launched in August 2026 on Ariane 62.

== Instruments ==
=== Flexible Combined Imager ===
The Flexible Combined Imager (FCI), a continuation of the Spinning Enhanced Visible and Infrared Imager (SEVIRI) instruments on Meteosat Second Generation satellites, is designed to provide near-real-time monitoring of Earth's atmosphere by scanning the full Earth disc every 10 minutes and its upper quarter, containing Europe, every 2.5 minutes in 16 visible and infrared channels. It observes at wavelengths between 0.3 and 13.3 μm, and has a spatial resolution of 1 to 2 km.

=== Lightning Imager ===
The Lightning Imager (LI) continuously detects the light pulses produced by different types of lightning: cloud-to-cloud, cloud-to-ground, and intra-cloud. It contains four cameras, capable of capturing 1,000 images per second, observing Europe, Africa, the Middle East, and partially also South America – in total covering 84% of the Earth disc. The instrument observes in a narrow spectral band centred on 777 nm and has a spatial resolution of around 10 km.

== History ==
MTG-I2 launch observed by GOES-19

In September 2025, MTG-I2's two instruments, FCI and LI, were mounted on the satellite platform at Thales Alenia Space in Cannes. The completed spacecraft then underwent a thermal vacuum test. In March 2026, the satellite completed its last environmental tests, followed by a series of health checks. In April 2026, the satellite, together with FLEX and Sentinel-3C, was on show at a media event hosted by Thales Alenia Space in Cannes. MTG-I2 was then transported to Guiana Space Centre and on 6 July 2026, it was taken out of its protective casing at the spaceport. The satellite was launched by Ariane 62 on 27 August 2026 at 20:11 UTC from Guiana Space Centre. This was Ariane 6's first mission to geostationary orbit. After separation, the satellite was healthy and transmitting signals.
