= P120C =

Solid-fuel first-stage rocket motor

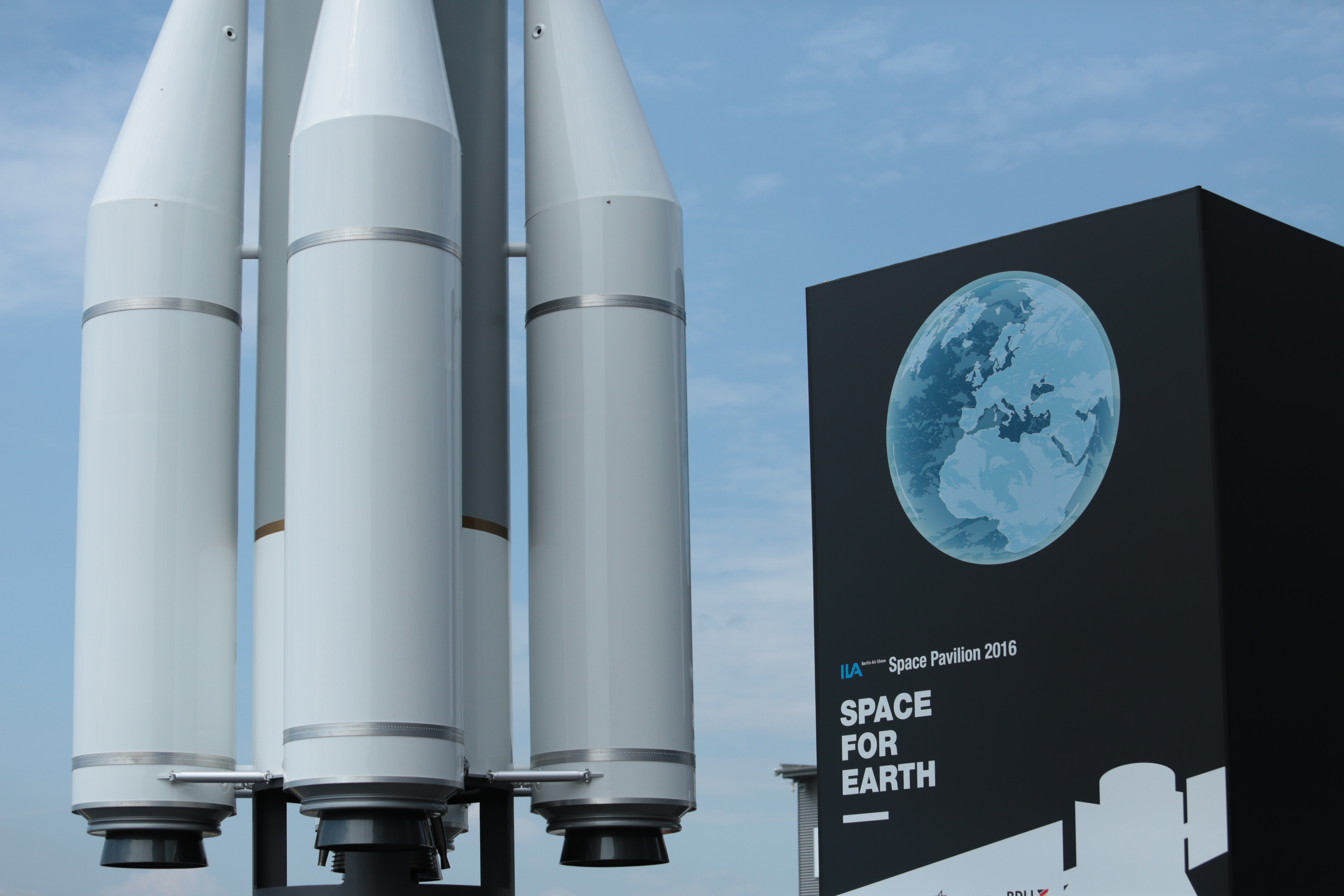
- Closeup view of four P120s on an Ariane 6 mockup at ILA Berlin Air Show 2016
- Manufacturer: Europropulsion
- Country of origin: Italy; France
- Used on: Ariane 6 (Block 1); Vega C

Associated stages
- Derived from: P80FW
- Derivatives: P160C

Launch history
- Status: Active
- Total launches: 8
- Successes (stage only): 8
- First flight: 13 July 2022

Technical details
- Height: 13.5 m (44 ft 3 in)
- Diameter: 3.4 m (11 ft)
- Empty mass: 11,200 kg (24,700 lb)
- Gross mass: 153,000 kg (337,000 lb)
- Propellant mass: 141,400 kg (311,700 lb)
- Maximum thrust: 4,780 kN (1,070,000 lb_{f})
- Specific impulse: 280 s (2.7 km/s)
- Propellant: HTPB / AP / Al

The P120C is a solid-fuel rocket motor developed for use as the first stage of the Vega C launch vehicle and as strap-on boosters for the Ariane 6. It was developed by Europropulsion, a joint venture between Avio and ArianeGroup, for the European Space Agency (ESA). The designation "P120C" reflects key characteristics of the motor: "P" stands for poudre (French for 'powder'), referencing its solid propellant; "120" denotes the original target of 120 tonnes of propellant (later increased to nearly 142 tonnes); and "C" signifies its common use across multiple launch systems.

As of July 2022, the P120C is the world's largest and most powerful single-piece solid-fuel rocket motor, surpassing the earlier P80FW used on the original Vega launcher.

== Development and Testing ==
Initially, production of the P120C was planned to be divided between Avio's main facility in Italy and MT Aerospace in Germany. However, in 2018, ESA decided to consolidate production entirely in Italy, with MT Aerospace focusing on Ariane 6's turbopumps.

The first successful test firing occurred at the Guiana Space Centre in July 2018, lasting 140 seconds and simulating a complete first-stage burn. Subsequent tests in 2019 and 2020 confirmed the motor's flight readiness for both launcher configurations.

== Design and Performance ==
The P120C builds upon the P80's design, utilizing a carbon fibre casing constructed via filament winding and fabric deposition techniques. It houses a 143.6 tonnes (317,000 lb) of HTPB 1912 propellant, a blend of 19% aluminium powder, 69% ammonium perchlorate with 12% of hydroxyl terminated polybutadiene binder. The motor's 25 centimetres (9.8 in) thick walls require 3,500 kilometres (2,200 mi) of carbon fiber, wound over 33 days in a climate-controlled environment. When operational, the P120C generates an average thrust of 4.5 meganewtons (1,000,000 lb_{f}).

== P160C ==
In 2022, development began on the P120C+ variant, which would evolve into the P160C. This extended version adds 1 metre (3 ft 3 in) to the motor's length and an additional 14 tonnes (14 long tons; 15 short tons) of propellant. This upgrade translates to a roughly 2 tonnes (4,400 lb) improvement in lift performance on the Ariane 64 with four boosters. Notably, 16 of the planned 18 Amazon Leo launches by Ariane 6 will utilize this enhanced booster, which saw the first flight on 17 June 2026.

== See also ==
- P80 (rocket stage)
- Zefiro (rocket stage)
- Solid rocket
- Vega (rocket)
