= Smart Upper Stage for Innovative Exploration =

Proposed European VTOL lifting body spacecraft

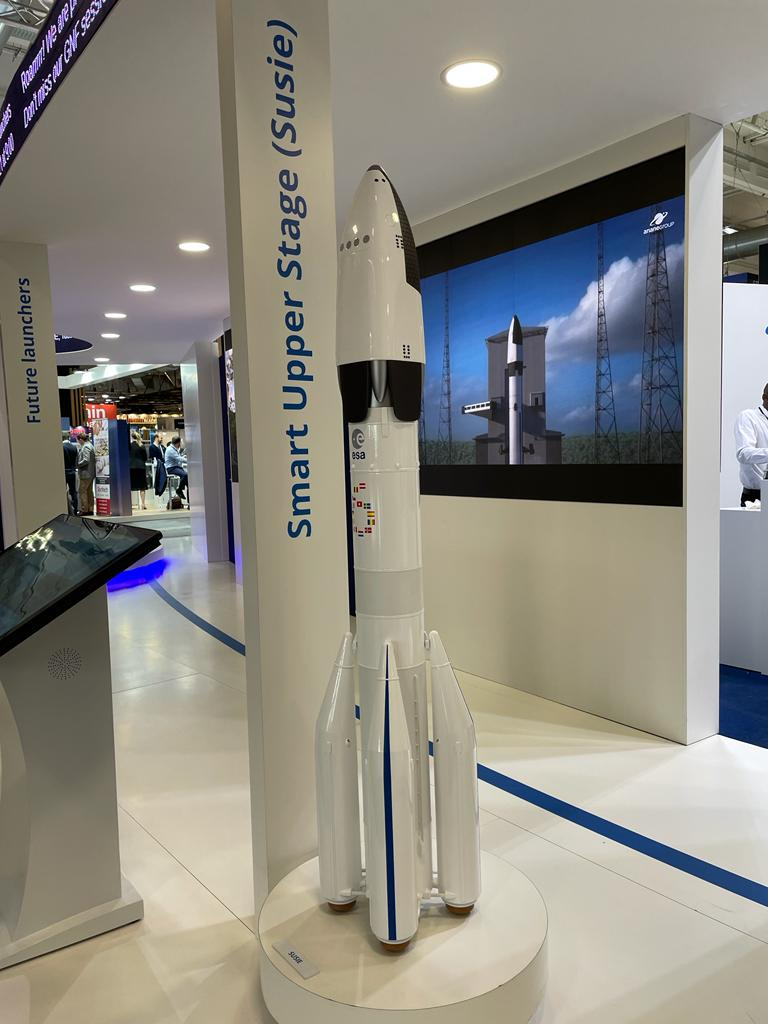
- Model of SUSIE Spacecraft on an Ariane 64 rocket
- Designer: ArianeGroup
- Country of origin: France
- Operator: ESA

Specifications
- Spacecraft type: Reusable spacecraft
- Launch mass: 25t
- Payload capacity: 7t/40m^{3}
- Crew capacity: 5

Dimensions
- Length: 12m
- Diameter: 5m

Production
- Status: Proposed

The Smart Upper Stage for Innovative Exploration (SUSIE) is a proposal for a reusable spacecraft designed by ArianeGroup. It is capable of crewed operations, carrying up to five astronauts to low Earth orbit (LEO), or alternatively functioning as an automated freighter capable of delivering payloads of up to seven tons. It is envisioned to be launched on the Ariane 64 launch vehicle for European Space Agency (ESA) missions.

== History ==
Work on what would become SUSIE commenced during 2020; in addition to ArianeGroup, various other European aerospace companies, including Airbus, Thales Alenia Space, and D-Orbit, have been early contributors to the project. The existence of SUSIE was revealed during the 2022 International Astronautical Congress in Paris. From an early stage, its development has been actively supported via research funding provided by the ESA's "New European Space Transportation Solutions" (NESTS) initiative; It has also benefitted from other programmes, such as the Intermediate eXperimental Vehicle. Work on SUSIE had been reportedly enacted in response to the recognition of a strategic priority to ensure the ESA possesses autonomous logistics capabilities.

SUSIE is designed to be a fully-reusable spacecraft, both the takeoff and landing phases are to be performed vertically. It has an internal cargo bay volume of 40 cubic meters, which is capable of accommodating up to five astronauts or, in an automated cargo configuration, carry a maximum payload of seven tons. The design of SUSIE is intended to be scalable without necessitated significant aerodynamic changes; this scalability permits it to better perform various mission roles. The payload bay is to be adaptable, such as being convertible into additional habitable volume for the crew to occupy during a longer mission, or to be replaced with propellant tanks and engines that could function comparably to complete upper stage. On longer duration crewed missions, such as beyond Earth orbit, the payload bay can convert into extra habitable volume for the crew to live comfortably. With the addition of a suitable additional space transfer module, SUSIE could reportedly conduct lunar missions. It has also been envisioned that it could participate in the construction of large orbital infrastructure and deorbit end-of-life satellites and other orbital debris.

The takeoff of SUSIE requires an external launch vehicle, which is initially intended to be the Ariane 64 launch vehicle. Later on, SUSIE could be used in conjunction with a future ArianeGroup reusable heavy-lift launcher. When paired with the Ariane 64, the latter's payload fairing is substituted for SUSIE. When fully fuelled, the total mass of the spacecraft is predicted to be 25 tons, which corresponds to the low Earth orbit (LEO) performance of the Ariane 64.

During atmospheric re-entry, SUSIE is intended to perform a propulsive landing (instead of using parachutes); one advantage of this approach is that the mission abort safety system would remain effective at all stages of a crewed mission, not only during the launch phase. Throughout the descent, no greater than three Gs is to be encountered at any point. Instead of using an escape tower, the envisaged emergency crew escape system uses a series of rocket motors at key locations across the exterior of the craft. Several comparisons have been made to other contemporary reusable spaceship programmes, including the SpaceX Starship, SpaceX Dragon 2, and Boeing Starliner, in particular due to the 'bellyflop' style maneuver that SUSIE is envisioned to perform during re-entry.

On 25 October 2023, a 1/6th-scale demonstrator, weighing 100 kg and with a height of 2m, was test-fired by ArianeGroup for the first time at their facility in Les Mureaux outside Paris. By this point, ArianeGroup had also reportedly started work on an intermediate version of SUSIE, which would be smaller than the heavy version. So-called 'hop' testing of the demonstrator is scheduled to continue through to mid-2025; early tests are to be focused on guidance and navigation functionality, while later testing shall include rocket-powered controlled descent, drop, and abort sequences.

As of November 2023, the proposed development timeline set out that a smaller commercial cargo version of SUSIE could be potentially ready for 2028, while crewed missions using the full-scale craft would not be expected to occur before the early 2030s. The project has yet to secure both approval and funding from European officials.

Scale model of SUSIE on an Ariane 64, and comparison to other current crew vehicles

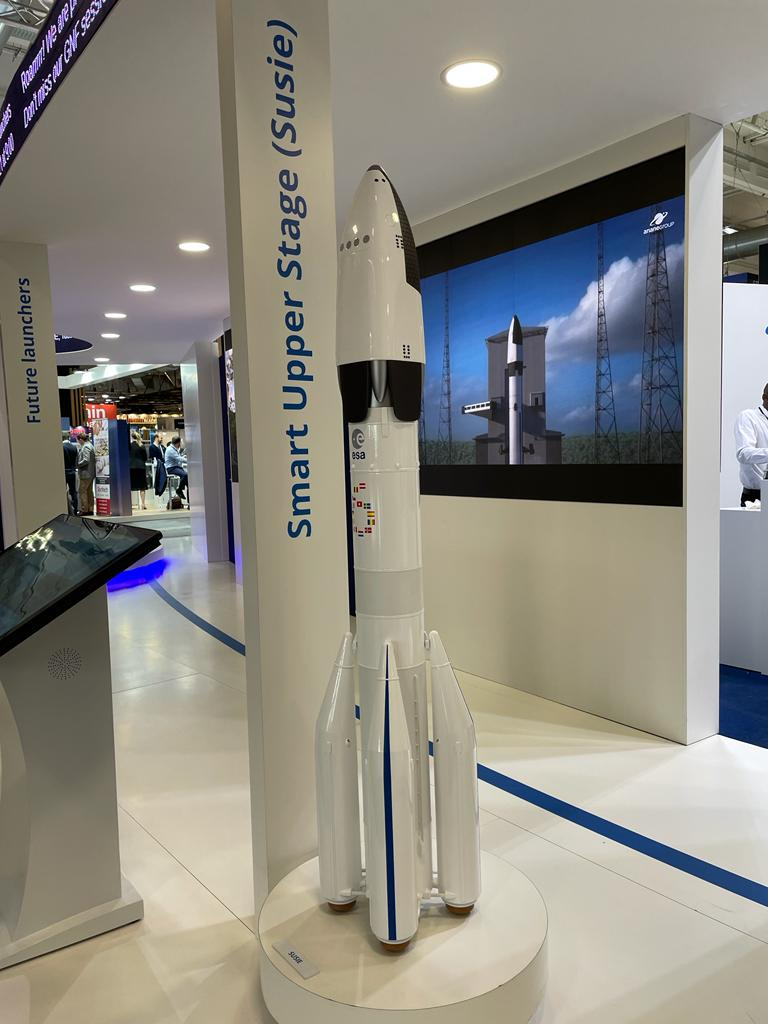

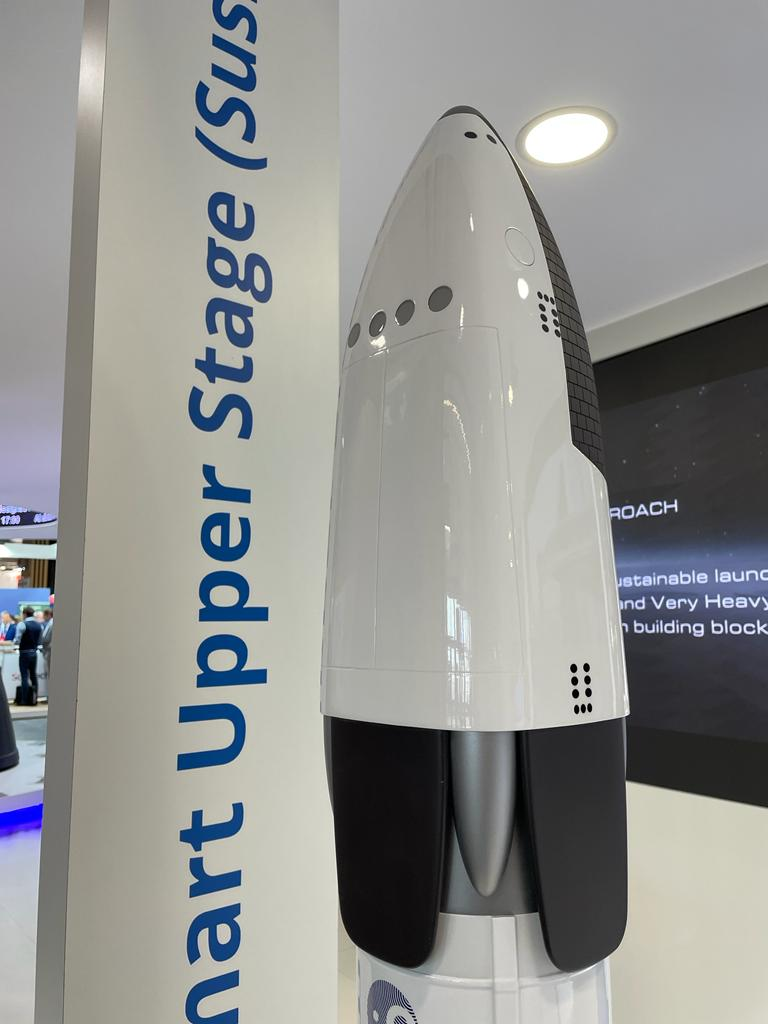

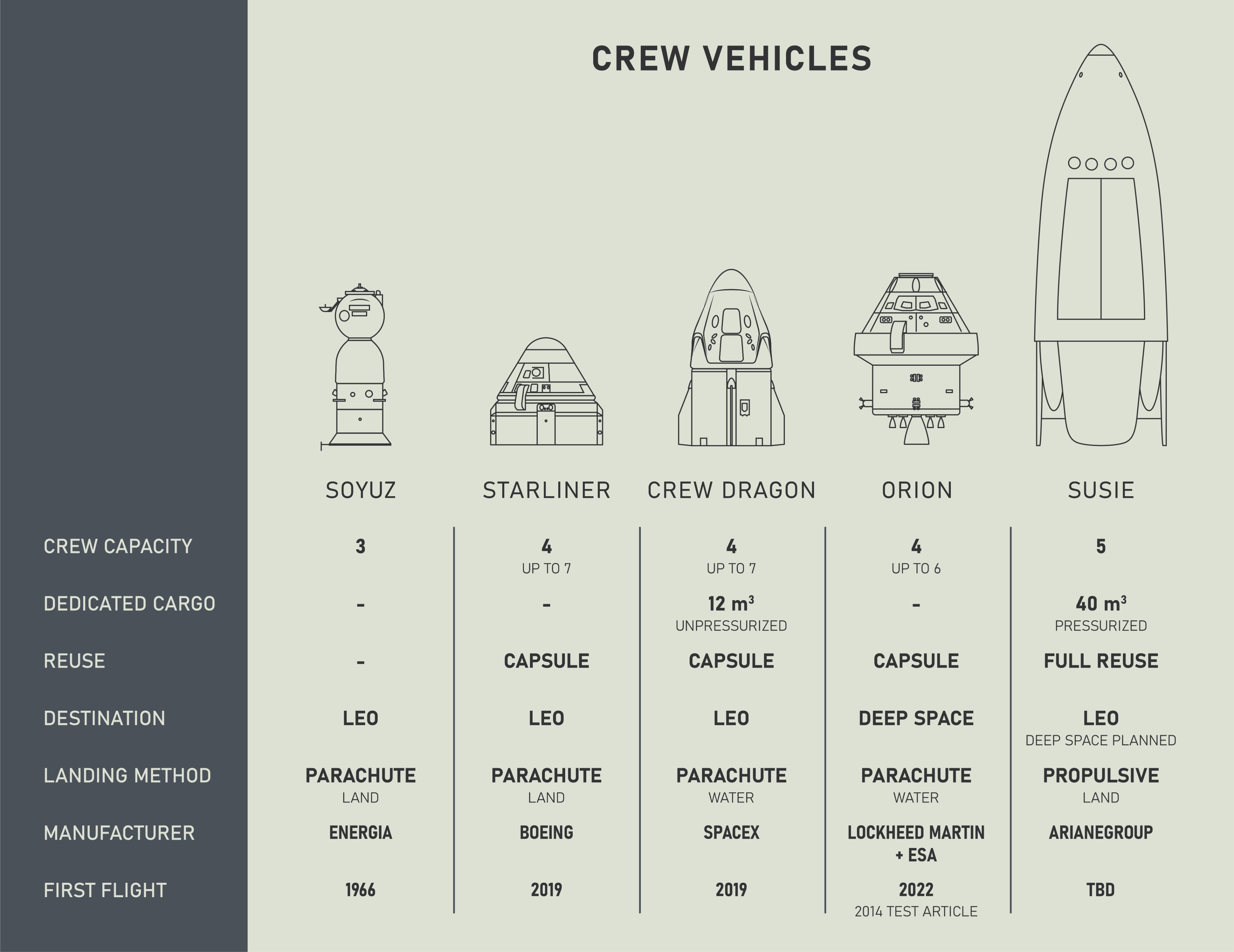
