= Programme for Reusable In-orbit Demonstrator in Europe =

Italian Space Agency program

Programme for Reusable In-orbit Demonstrator in Europe (PRIDE)
Program overview
- Organization: ESA and Italian Space Agency
- Purpose: Reusable spaceship for ESA
- Status: Critical design review

Programme history
- First flight: 11 February 2015

Vehicle information
- Launch vehicle: Vega C

The Programme for Reusable In-orbit Demonstrator in Europe (PRIDE) is an Italian Space Agency programme that aims to develop a reusable robotic spaceplane named Space Rider in collaboration with the European Space Agency.

The PRIDE programme was approved at the ESA Ministerial Council in Naples, Italy on 21 November 2012 under the parent ESA programme called Future Launchers Preparatory Programme (FLPP). The Space Rider spaceplane will be similar to, but smaller and cheaper than, the Boeing X-37. It will be launched in 2028 by the Vega C rocket, operate robotically in orbit, and land automatically on a runway.

== History ==
The European Space Agency has a program called Future Launchers Preparatory Programme (FLPP), which made a call for submissions for a reusable spaceplane. One of the submissions was by the Italian Space Agency, that presented their 'Programme for Reusable In-orbit Demonstrator in Europe' (PRIDE program) which went ahead to develop the prototype named Intermediate eXperimental Vehicle (IXV) and the consequential Space Rider spaceplane that inherits technology from its prototype IXV.

The PRIDE programme was initially funded by the European Space Agency (ESA) on 21 November 2012, at the ESA Ministerial Council in Naples, Italy. The project was created with the objective of creating a small uncrewed spaceplane that was also affordable and reusable. During the initial design stage the vehicle was referred to as PRIDE-ISV; the suffix ISV stands for Innovative Space Vehicle. The PRIDE development team began industrial activities in September 2015. The first launch of the Space Rider production spaceplane is expected around 2028.

== Intermediate eXperimental Vehicle ==
The Intermediate eXperimental Vehicle (IXV) was developed to serve as a prototype spaceplane to validate ESA's preliminary work. It was launched on 11 February 2015 and flown to 412 km (256 mi) altitude. It was then brought down under a parasail for a splashdown on the Pacific Ocean.

== Space Rider ==
With affordability in mind, the Space Rider spaceplane is based on technologies developed and tested on the IXV. The Space Rider is also a lifting body without wings or vertical fins. For landing, it will deploy a parasail and land on a field.

The Space Rider spaceplane will be capable of carrying a 300 kg payload into orbit. It will be equipped with solar panels, allowing for two months in-orbit operations. Vega will be used as a launch vehicle.

The Space Rider will be used as an orbital test platform for re-usable launcher stages, Earth observation, robotic exploration, servicing of orbital infrastructures, and microgravity experiments.

== See also ==
- Atmospheric Reentry Demonstrator (ARD) - ESA reentry testbed flown in 1998
- Avatar space shuttle (DRDO-India)
- Boeing X-37 - A comparable United States Air Force spaceplane
- European eXPErimental Re-entry Testbed (EXPERT) - Research programme developing materials used in IXV
- Future Launchers Preparatory Programme - parent programme for IXV
- Hopper - an earlier ESA project on developing crewed spaceplane, cancelled
- RLV-TD Reusable space shuttle demonstration programme by ISRO (India)
