= Avio =

Italian Aerospace Company

Avio S.p.A.
- Type: Public (Società per azioni)
- Traded as: BIT: AVIO.MI; FTSE MIB component
- Industry: Aerospace, Defence, Marine, Electronics, Energy
- Predecessor: Fiat Avio
- Founded: 2003; 23 years ago, in Turin, Italy
- Headquarters: Colleferro, Metropolitan City of Rome, Italy
- Key people: Ranzo Giulio (CEO)
- Products: Space propulsion and launch vehicles
- Revenue: ▲€357 million (2022)
- Operating income: ▼€2.2 million (2022)
- Net income: ▼€1.3 million (2022)
- Owner: Leonardo (19%)
- Number of employees: ▲1,216 (June 2023)
- Website: www.avio.com

Avio S.p.A. is an Italian company operating in the aerospace sector with its head office in Colleferro near Rome, Italy. Created by a merger in 2003, and with roots tracing back to 1908, it is present in Italy and abroad with different commercial offices and 10 production sites. Avio operates in:

- solid-propellant motors for space and tactical propulsion
- electronic/electrical control and automation systems

Avio is Prime Contractor for the new European launcher Vega and sub-contractor for the Ariane program, both financed by the European Space Agency (ESA).

The company is active in the field of technological research. It carries out projects in collaboration with 14 Italian and 10 foreign universities and research centres, which are aimed at the continuous improvement of product and process technologies. It also undertakes the research of solutions in order to reduce the environmental impact of aircraft engines, in conformity with the objectives of consumption and emissions reduction dictated, within the European area, by the ACARE body.

Avio has 5 sites in Italy, France and French Guiana, and employs around 1200 people, about 30% of whom work in research and development.

Avio is listed on the Milan stock exchange in the Star segment: in 2018 it had revenues of 388.7 million euros.

On November 17th, ICEYE announced an all-cash tender offer at €41 per share to take Avios private and build an integrated European space and defence group.

== History ==
=== Early 20th century ===
In 1908, aeronautical production was in its early stages in Turin, Italy. At that time Fiat decided to design and produce an airplane engine, the SA 8/75, derived from racing cars. The first mass-produced engine produced by Fiat was the A10. 1,070 units were created between 1914 and 1915: at this point the pioneer age had come to an end and the company decided to design and construct complete aircraft. Thus in 1916 the Società Italiana Aviazione was founded, changing its name in 1918 to Fiat Aviazione.

In Turin, besides aircraft engines, and along the lines of the internal-combustion engine, Fiat diversified production with the construction in 1909 of Fiat San Giorgio for marine diesel engines, the area from which activities in the field of industrial engines for electric power generation later ensued. In Colleferro (Rome), the Bombrini Parodi-Delfino-BPD Company, established in Genoa in 1912, started manufacturing explosives and chemical products, from which the space segment originated.

The aeronautical field began in Brindisi with the SACA Company. Gradually, other companies began such as the CMASA di Marina Company in Pisa, founded in 1921 by German design engineer Claude Dornier, in collaboration with Rinaldo Piaggio and Attilio Odero.

=== Development of large engines and turbines ===
Avio were present in the development and manufacture of engines for the production of electric energy, having developed large engines for ships.

Fiat started the study of marine engines in 1903. Beginning from 1926, with engineer Giovanni Chiesa, the manufacture with engines with 750mm-diameter cylinders, the maximum diameter permitted by technologies of the time, which increased engine power up to 4,500HP. In 1971, production began on large diesel engines in Trieste, in a new factory established through a collaboration agreement with the state company IRI (Institute for Industrial Reconstruction).

Starting from the 1930s, a strategy of diversification, which derived from engines produced for ships and submarines, led Avio entering the field of railway diesel engines, while the first engines for the production of electric energy for industrial use had been experimented with in the early post-war period. The development of a gas turbine was started up through a collaboration agreement stipulated with Westinghouse in 1954. Avio's experience in this field, combined with the increased availability of methane gas, enabled the development and manufacture of several electric power generation plants in Italy and abroad.

The success of the gas turbines led to the decision to leave the segment of large diesel engines in order to focus on this. In 1973, Fiat set up the company Turbomeccanica Turbogas (TTG), focusing entirely on the Turin Company's activities in the energy sector. In 1986, Fiat Aviazione incorporated TTG, and developed the activities until 2001, when it was made over to Siemens, changing the marine and industrial activities to the development of aeroderivative turbines.

=== Development of explosives and propellants ===
The BPD industrial plants were established 50 km from Rome, along the railway line for Cassino, due to the initiative of the engineer Leopoldo Parodi – Delfino, supported by Senator Giovanni Bombrini, and the resolution of the State to provide the country with an independent production capacity in the chemical field.

Situated in a poor region of Roman countryside, the town of Colleferro began around the industrial site and was elevated to a municipal district in 1935 by Royal Decree. The town grew in correlation with the production activities of BPD that, from explosives, extended to several chemical products derived for agricultural and industrial uses. The production plants developed and expanded attracting labour, and the company provided for social works.

In 1927, the BPD Test Centre started to experiment on the first rockets powered by chemical powder. After the Second World War, on the initiative of Francesco Serra di Cassano, son-in-law and successor to BPD's founder, mechanical production, which had been started up in the 1930s for munitions activities, was developed and expanded. The Test Centre intensified experimentation on propellants, beginning with the launching of multi-stage sounding rockets for research in the upper atmosphere, produced at the Salto di Quirra military firing range in Sardinia, in the early 1960s.

In 1966, following its success with the rockets, BPD entered into a contract with ELDO (forerunner of the European Space Agency – ESA) for the development and production of the apogee boost motor of the ELDO-PAS telecommunications satellite. This led to development in the field of solid-propellant motors.

In 1968, the SNIA Viscosa Company took over BPD, which became SNIA-BPD. In 1975, under this company configuration, ESA initially gave the BPD branch of SNIA the task of developing and producing the separation motors of the European Ariane satellite launcher, and in 1984, the contract for the manufacture of the Ariane 5 boosters. The Ariane take-off motors have been completed now for over twenty years at the launch site in French Guiana, under the subsidiary companies Europropulsion and Regulus, set up in 1988.

In 1990, SNIA sold the BPD branch to the Gilardini Company, which was bought by Fiat Aviazione in 1994. From 1989 Fiat Aviazione became FiatAvio S.p.A.

=== Aviation activities ===
Fiat took on the role of Italian prime contractor for the NATO F-104G aircraft. With the name change of the Fiat Aviazione to Fiat Avio in 1989, the company collaborated on the design and manufacture of propulsion systems for, among the others, the Panavia Tornado and Harrier in the military sector, and Boeing and Airbus in the commercial one.

In 1997, the acquisition of the controlling stake in Alfa Romeo Avio from Finmeccanica was key to a national strategic project aimed at reducing the excessive fragmentation of the Italian companies and at increasing competitiveness through more systematic synergies.

=== From 2000 to 2011 ===
Avio has thus been able to set out on the road of growing internationalisation, placing itself among the major world players in the field of the design and production of components and modules for aerospace propulsion. The foundation of AvioPolska in 2001, was followed in 2005 by the creation of DutchAero, with the acquisition of Phillips Aerospace.

In 2003, the Fiat Group, struggling with the crisis in the automobile sector, sold Fiat Avio S.p.A. to a consortium formed by the US fund The Carlyle Group (70%), and Finmeccanica S.p.A. (30%), which beat off competition from French company Snecma. Fiat Avio was valued at the timea at €1.5 billion, and changed its name to Avio S.p.A.

In August 2006, the British fund Cinven announced the acquisition of Avio S.p.A. from Carlyle for a total value of €2.57 billion.

Avio S.p.A. was then held by the sole shareholder BCV Investments S.C.A., a company under Luxembourg law that was mainly owned by funds traceable to the British company Cinven Limited (85%) and a company belonging to Leonardo S.p.A. (15%).

=== The spin-off in 2012 ===
In December 2012, it was announced that an agreement had been signed for the acquisition by General Electric of the aeronautical division of Avio Spa. The purchase was finalized on 1 August 2013 for a cost of €3.3 billion and determined the split between Avio's space division, which continues to be owned by Cinven and Leonardo, and the company's aviation division, which took the name Avio Aero and thus became a GE Aerospace business now totally unrelated to the Avio Group.

=== From 2012 to today ===
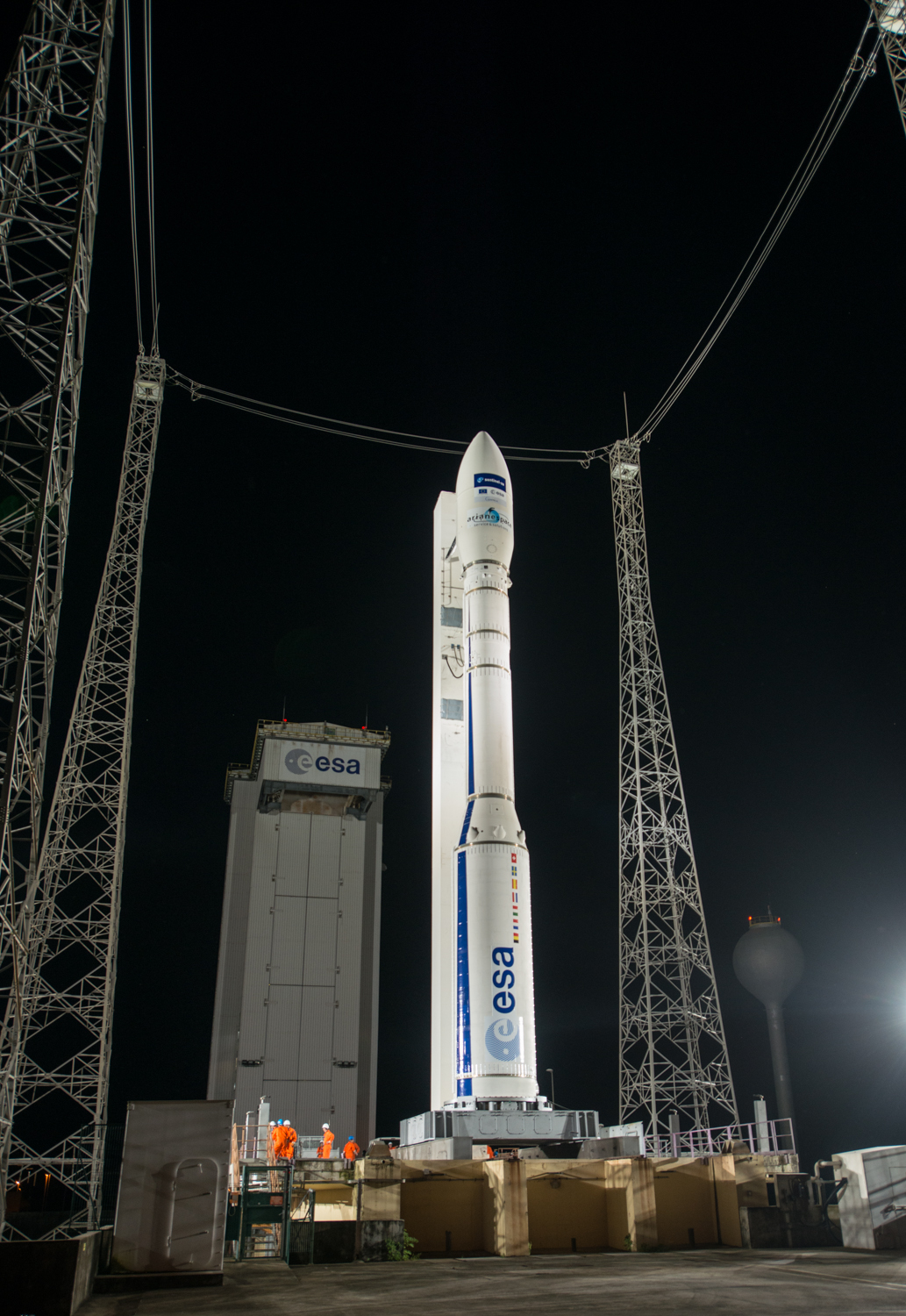
Vega launcher on the launch pad

==== The Vega launcher ====
The main programme Avio is working on is the European Vega small-lift launcher. The rocket consists of four stages, the first three equipped with solid propellant motors and the last one using liquid propulsion. It is about 30 metres high overall, with a maximum diameter of 3 metres. The maximum load it can carry is 1,500 kg in polar orbit at an altitude of about 700 km.

The Vega's maiden flight took place in February 2012. Following the success of this first launch, the project has grown in importance and the launcher has made eighteen flights, putting various types of cargo into orbit, including numerous microsatellites for various private, institutional and government customers. With the VV04 mission, Vega put the IXV (Intermediate eXperimental Vehicle), a prototype of the European reusable Space Rider, into a sub-orbital trajectory.

Within the Vega programme, Avio is currently prime contractor for the production of the new-generation light launchers:

- Vega C, whose qualification launch is scheduled for 2022;
- Vega E, for which preliminary study activities started up and the first tests were conducted on a prototype of the M10 liquid oxygen-methane engine at a reduced scale in 2018 and a full-scale prototype in 2020. The qualification launch is scheduled for 2025.

==== Ariane 5 and Ariane 6 launchers ====
The Ariane programme was born in the early 1970s with the objective of building space launchers optimised for geostationary transfer orbits under the sponsorship of the ESA and the Ariane Group, which plays the role of prime contractor in this project.

Within the programme, Avio has been involved in the development and production of boosters and stage separation motors since the 1970s. Currently, for the Ariane 5 programme, it is acting as subcontractor for the development and production of the liquid-oxygen turbopump for the Vulcain 2 engine and the P230 solid-propellant engine, the booster used as the first stage in a dual configuration.

As regards the new European medium-heavy Ariane 6 launcher, Avio is responsible for the P120C solid-propellant motor (common to the first stage of the Vega C), which will act as a booster for the launcher (in dual configuration for the medium Ariane 62 version and in quadruple configuration for the heavy Ariane 64 version), and the liquid-oxygen turbopump (LOX) for the Vinci motor.

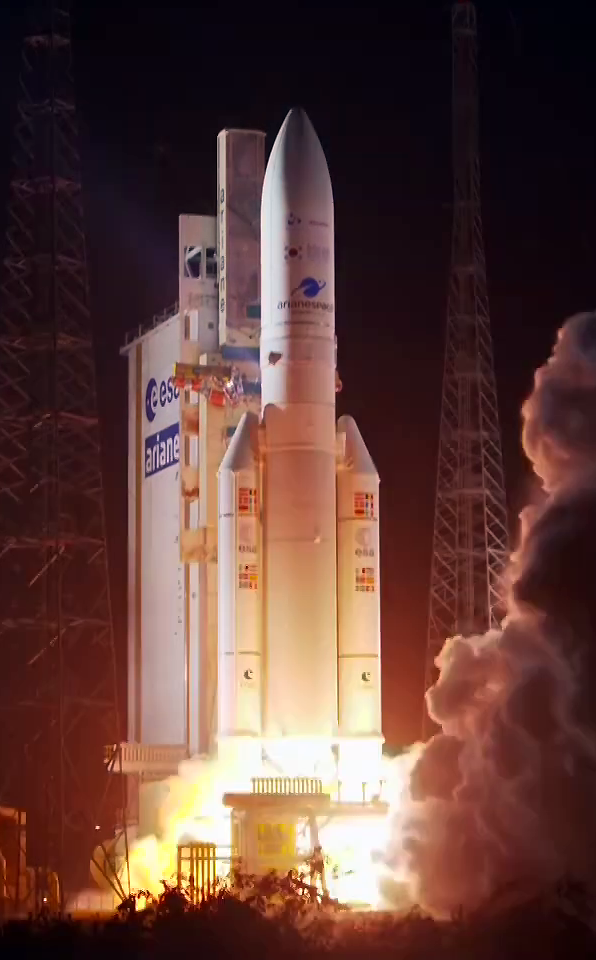
Ariane 5 at liftoff

The maiden launch of Ariane 6 took place on 9 July 2024.

==== Solid-propellant propulsion systems for anti-air missiles ====
In October 2013, Avio signed a contract with MBDA, a European consortium engaged in the construction of missiles and missile defence technologies,[14] for the design and production of the engine of the CAMM-ER (Common Anti-air Modular Missile Extended Range). Avio is also responsible for the engine of the booster of the Aster 30 anti-aircraft/anti-missile missile.

==== Other space systems ====
===== Space Rider =====
The Space Rider programme envisages the construction of a reusable space module launched by the Vega C launcher capable of orbiting the Earth for weeks and then re-entering the Earth's surface by landing on an airstrip. The programme, currently still in the research and development phase, is targeting 2023 for the first mission. The Space Rider programme originated at the ESA Ministerial Conference in 2014, and sees Avio in the role of Co-Prime Contractor together with Thales Alenia Space.

===== HERA mission =====
Avio will participate in the ESA's HERA mission, which foresees the study of an asteroid with the ultimate goal of developing a space defence system against possible future asteroid impacts on the Earth's surface.

==== Listing on the Stock Exchange ====
On April 1, 2017, Avio officially carried out the merger with Space2 and obtained the necessary clearance from Consob for admission to the Milan Stock Exchange. In particular, the incorporation of Avio into Space2 took place with the acquisition of 85.68% of Avio's share capital by Space2, Leonardo S.p.A. and In Orbit s.r.l.. The company subsequently took the name Avio S.p.A.

On 10 April 2017, the listing on the stock exchange took place. As a result of the transaction Leonardo Finmeccanica increased its shareholding (from 14% to about 28%); more than 40 managers also joined the shareholding structure with a stake of about 4% through the corporate vehicle InOrbit srl.

==== Subsidiaries, Joint-Ventures and holdings ====
Among others, Avio holds control or shareholdings in the following companies:

- 70% of SpaceLab, a Joint Venture with the Italian Space Agency (ASI) for the development of new propulsion systems;
- 60% of Regulus, a company incorporated under French law that is responsible for the loading of solid propulsion motors at the space base in French Guiana;
- 50% of Europropulsion, a joint venture with ArianeGroup, responsible for the integration of European launchers in French Guiana;
- 3% of shares in the French company Arianespace, European launch service provider, responsible for the sale and management of the European Vega and Ariane launchers.

==== Management ====
Giulio Ranzo has held the role of chief executive officer since 2015, while Roberto Italia holds the role of chairman of the board of directors.

==== SPTF at Perdasdefogu ====
Towards the beginning of 2020, the company announced the start of the construction of the Space Propulsion Test Facility at Perdasdefogu, a firing range with test bench where future liquid propellant engines will be tested.

== Production and activities ==
The company currently operates in Italy and abroad at its headquarters in Colleferro (Rome), and has other branches in Campania (Airola in the province of Benevento), Piedmont (Rivalta in the province of Turin) and France (Metropolitan and French Guiana) with a total of about 1000 employees.

Main sectors of activities are:

- design, development and production of space launchers (Vega C in production and Vega E in development; formerly Vega);
- solid and liquid propellant propulsion systems for the Ariane 5 and Ariane 6 programmes;
- solid propellant propulsion systems for tactical missiles (Aster 30, Aspide, Marte and Camm-ER);
- liquid propellant propulsion systems for satellites;
- research and development.
