= Space Rider =

Planned ESA uncrewed spaceplane

- Artist's rendering of Space Rider from 2017 (RM on front—left, AOM behind—right)
- Names: Space Reusable Integrated Demonstrator for Europe Return
- Mission type: Uncrewed reusable spaceplane
- Operator: European Space Agency
- Website: ESA.int: Space Rider
- Mission duration: 60 days (planned)

Spacecraft properties
- Spacecraft: Space Rider
- Spacecraft type: Lifting body spaceplane
- Manufacturer: (Italy) (France) Avio, Thales Alenia Space
- Launch mass: Approx. 4900 kg (Full stack AOM + RM, including fluids and propellants)
- Landing mass: up to 2850kg
- Payload mass: 600 kg (1,300 lb)
- Dimensions: Length: 8.044 m (26.39 ft) (Full stack AOM + RM)
- Power: 600 watts

Start of mission
- Launch date: Q1 2028 (planned)
- Rocket: Vega-C+
- Launch site: Guiana Space Centre
- Contractor: Arianespace

End of mission
- Landing site: Santa Maria Island

Orbital parameters
- Reference system: Geocentric
- Regime: Low Earth orbit
- PRIDE programme

The Space Rider (Space Reusable Integrated Demonstrator for Europe Return) is a planned uncrewed orbital lifting body spaceplane aiming to provide the European Space Agency (ESA) with affordable and routine access to space. Space Rider will have the potential to allow experiments in microgravity, such as exposure of materials to outer space and in-orbit validation of technologies, as well as deployment of small satellites. Its maiden flight is currently scheduled for Q1 2028. It is intended to be put into space by the Vega C medium lift launch vehicle.

== Background ==
Development of Space Rider is being led by the Italian Programme for Reusable In-orbit Demonstrator in Europe (PRIDE programme) in collaboration with ESA, and is the continuation of the Intermediate eXperimental Vehicle (IXV) experience, launched on 11 February 2015. The cost of this phase, not including the launcher, is at least US$36.7 million. At the ESA Ministerial Council held in Seville in November 2019, the development of the Space Rider was subscribed by the participating member states with an allocation of €195.73 million.At the ESA Ministerial Council of 2022 and 2025, Space Rider program was subscribed by the participating member states with an allocation of €84.5 million and €27.4 million (with additional €38.05 million added by Italy)

The European Space Agency has a program called Future Launchers Preparatory Programme (FLPP), which made a call for submissions for a reusable spaceplane. One of the submissions was by the Italian Space Agency, that presented their own Programme for Reusable In-orbit Demonstrator in Europe (PRIDE programme) which went ahead to develop the precursor called Intermediate eXperimental Vehicle (IXV) and the resulting Space Rider. By 2025, the ESA plans to privatise the Space Rider, with Arianespace the likely operator.

== Missions ==
The qualification flight of Space Rider is scheduled for Q1 2028. On completion of the two-month long maiden mission, Space Rider will return to Earth with the payloads stowed in its cargo bay. The maiden flight will be followed by several missions to demonstrate a range of capabilities and orbits, before handing over the project to the private sector.

== Design ==
The Space Rider design inherits technology developed for the earlier Intermediate eXperimental Vehicle, also within the PRIDE programme. The design team considered the trade-offs of using only a lifting body and also using optional wings or vertical fins. It was then decided in 2017 that the design should optimise the internal volume of the Vega rocket fairing, so its aerodynamic shape will be a simple lifting body, as tested on its predecessor, the IXV. A 3-axis control during reentry is achieved by the use of rear flaps.

Space Rider compared to other European reusable spacecraft: Nyx and Vortex-S

Space Rider is designed to launch atop the Vega-C+ launch vehicle from Guiana Space Centre, utilizing the new P160C first stage due to mass requirements. The spacecraft is being designed to conduct missions up to two months long in low Earth orbit with up to 600 kg of cargo. The re-entry module itself is a testbed for entry technologies as the IXV precursor was, so future improvements are envisioned, including point-to-point flights, even space tourism.

== Service module ==
Space Rider's service module is a modified version of the Vega-C AVUM+, which will extend the time that can be spent in orbit by at least two months before Space Rider returns with its cargo to Earth to land on the ground. The Vega C Avum+ upper stage is upgraded with the addition of the AVUM Life Extension Kit (ALEK), developed by Beyond Gravity, which includes the two deployable solar wings. The service module will provide power, attitude control and deorbit capability, and it will separate from the spacecraft just before atmospheric reentry.

== Landing ==
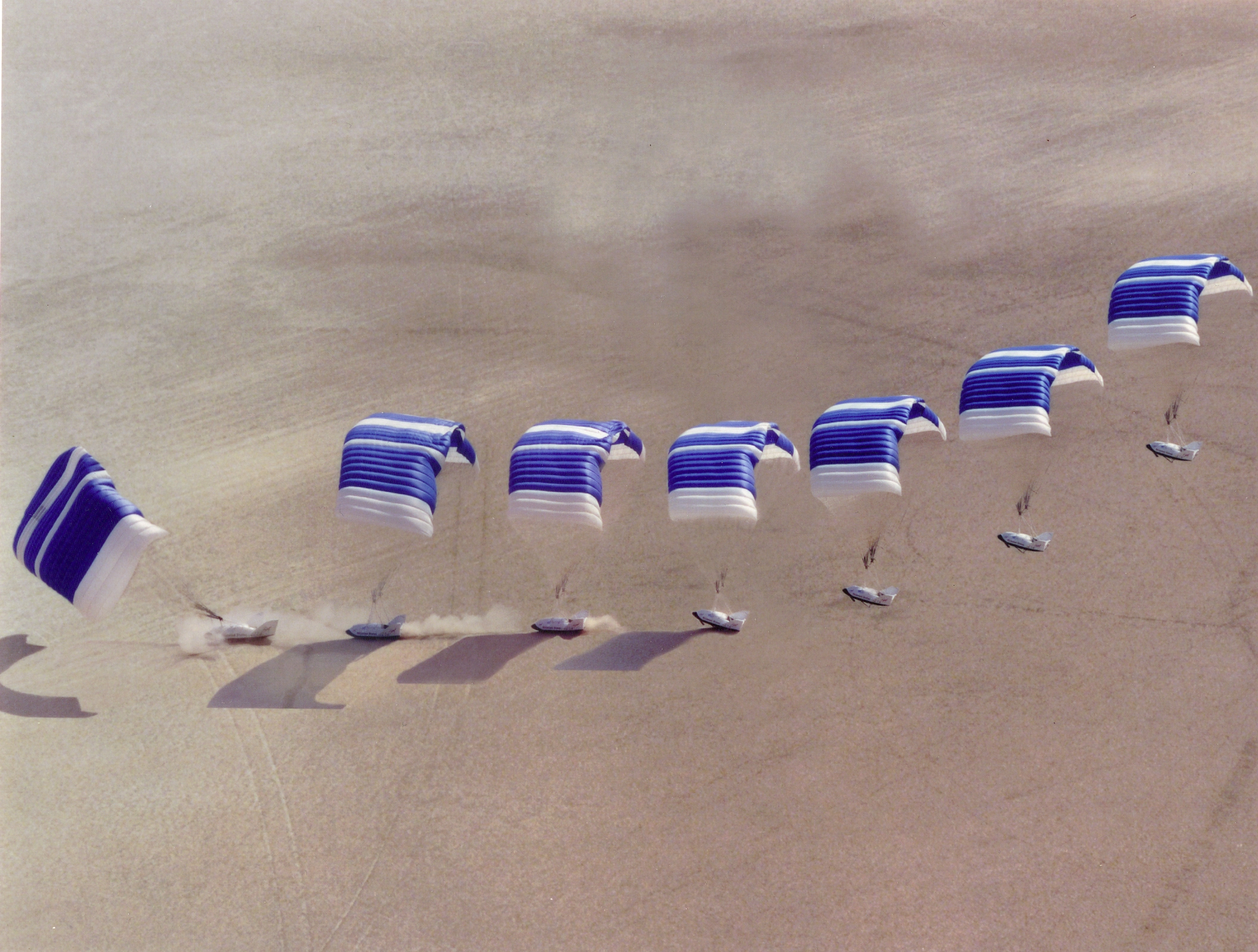
Space Rider will use a controllable parafoil for landing, as used by the NASA X-38 in 1999.

Upon atmospheric entry, the lifting body shape will decelerate the spacecraft to subsonic speed (below Mach 0.8), when one or two drogue parachute will be deployed at about 15–12 km altitude to slow it further (to Mach 0.18 - 0.22) Then, a controllable gliding parachute called parafoil will be deployed to begin the controlled descent phase for a nearly horizontal touchdown (≈35 m/s) using no wheels. The landing concept is similar to the NASA X-38 landing system. The baseline landing site is the Guiana Space Centre. For orbits with inclination >37°, landings could be performed at the Portuguese Santa Maria Island in the Azores archipelago.

== Preliminary specifications ==
'RM' is reentry module, 'AOM' is the service module.

Space Rider	Parameter/units
Crew	None (robotic only)
Length (RM+AOM)	≥ 8.044 m (26.39 ft)
RM Length	≥ 4.6 m (15 ft)
AOM Length	≥ 3.5 m (11 ft)
Payload volume	≥ 1.2 m^{3} (1200 liters)
Mass	Max. 4,900 kg (10,800 lb)
Payload mass	620 kg (1,370 lb)
Flight time	At least 60 days
Landing mass	2,850 kg (6,280 lb)
Landing accuracy	150 m
Landing speeds	Horizontal: 35 m/s; vertical: 3 m/s
Parachute deployment shock	< 4 g
Power	600 watts
Reusability	6 flights
Turnaround time	<6 months

== Space Rider Observer Cube ==
Space Rider Observer Cube
- Mission type: Technology demonstration
- Operator: European Space Agency

Spacecraft properties
- Spacecraft type: 12U CubeSat
- Manufacturer: (Italy) Tyvak International, Politecnico di Torino, University of Padova, Stellar Project

Start of mission
- Launch date: 2028 (planned)
- Rocket: Vega-C+
- Deployed from: Space Rider

Orbital parameters
- Reference system: Geocentric
- Regime: Low Earth orbit

ESA's General Support Technology Programme (GSTP) is supporting the development of a 12U CubeSat technology demonstrator called Space Rider Observer Cube (SROC) which is intended to fly aboard Space Rider on its maiden flight and once in orbit, to test various technologies and manoeuvres for small satellite proximity operations, optical navigation, inspection, and rendezvous and docking. The CubeSat will include a miniaturised docking adapter and retractable solar panels. SROC is being built by an Italian consortium of Tyvak International, Politecnico di Torino, University of Padova, and Stellar Project.

== Timeline ==
=== Design and development ===
- Funding was initially approved by the ESA in 2016, with the project to be led by the Italian Aerospace Research Centre (CIRA). Thales Alenia Space and Lockheed Martin were tasked with completing the design by 2019.
- In November 2017, the ESA approved funding to Thales Alenia Space and Avio to build reentry and service modules, respectively.
- Activities for Phase-B2/C, covering the Preliminary Design Review (PDR) started on 25 January 2018.
- In April 2018, ESA released an Announcement of Opportunity (AoO) to fly small payloads on Space Rider's maiden flight. By June 2019, the project was advancing towards the Critical Design Review (CDR) at the end of 2019.
- The Critical Design Review (CDR) began in late 2019. In late November 2019, the project was fully approved by ESA and will be funded mostly by Italy,. An industrial reorganisation followed the ESA Ministerial Council held in 2019. To deal with it a design bridging phase was put in place with the System CDR planned in mid-2022.
- In December 2020, ESA signed contracts with co-prime contractors Thales Alenia Space and Avio for delivery of the Space Rider flight model, which in turn manage a consortium of more than 20 European companies operating in the space sector. The Italian Space Agency (ASI) subsequently contracted with Virgin Galactic for a suborbital research flight on SpaceShipTwo for research related to Space Rider.
- On 20 June 2023, the Space Rider programme proceeded into Phase D of its development, allowing qualification and production to commence.

=== Qualification and testing ===
==== Landing ====
- In early August 2024, the first parafoil guided landing tests were performed in Sardinia by dropping a full-scale model from a helicopter.
- In November 2024, Portugal Space announced that the island of Santa Maria has been chosen as the landing site for the inaugural flight of Space Rider.
- In June 2025, the second set of drop tests, focusing on autonomous control and using a CH-47 Chinook helicopter, was completed at the Salto di Quirra range in Sardinia. This test campaign was originally planned for late 2024.
- In September 2025, Romania's National Institute for Aerospace Research (INCAS) has completed qualification testing of the Descent and Landing Test Model (DLRM) and later delivered it to CIRA in Capua in October 2025 for use in the third and final drop test campaign at the Salto di Quirra testing range in Sardinia. The final drop test campaign is expected to take place in early 2026.
- In April 2026, CIRA completed the Space Rider drop model by integrating its avionics and parafoil.
- In early May 2026, ESA attempted a drop test of the model using a CH-47 Chinook helicopter. The test was aborted after an unspecified anomaly during the captive ascent phase.
- On 6 October 2026, the drop model was destroyed when its parafoil detached itself during flight.

==== Service module ====
- In December 2024, Beyond Gravity has delivered the ALEK structure, a component of the service module, to Avio.
- In January 2025, the main structure of the first service module was delivered for testing in the Netherlands.
- In April 2025, the ALEK (AVUM Life Extension Kit) structure has finished its mechanical tests, qualifying for launch.

==== Re-entry module ====
- In February 2025, CIRA has announced the successful qualification of Space Rider's body flaps.
- In July 2025, CIRA has completed the qualification testing campaign of the nose cone, the largest single component of the re-entry module's thermal protection system with a diameter of 1.3 m.
- In April 2026, CIRA has successfully completed testing of the re-entry performance of Space Rider's thermal protection system when damaged by micrometeoroids or orbital debris.

=== Integration ===
- By November 2025, all flight hardware has been manufactured and was awaiting integration or undergoing testing.

== See also ==
- Boeing X-37, a winged spaceplane by the U.S. Air Force
- RLV-TD, a spaceplane project by ISRO
- Dream Chaser, a private lifting body spaceplane developed by Sierra Space
- Vortex – Future European spaceplane
- Hermes (spaceplane), CNES/ESA spaceplane concept from 1975
- SUSIE, a 2022 ArianeGroup proposal for a reusable crewed spacecraft
- List of spaceplanes
- List of European Space Agency programmes and missions
