= List of spaceplanes =

A spaceplane is a winged vehicle that acts as an aeroplane while in the atmosphere and as a spacecraft while in space. Most concepts were only capable of sub-orbital spaceflight.

Type	Country	Class	Role	Date	Status	No.	Notes
ASSET	USA	Rocket launch	Experimental	1963	Prototype		Uncrewed reentry test vehicle.
Boeing X-20 Dyna-Soar	USA	Rocket launch	Experimental	1963	Project		Crewed
Boeing X-37	USA	Rocket launch	Utility	2010	Prototype		Robotic orbiter operated by the United States Armed Forces.
BOR-4	USSR	Rocket launch	Experimental	1982	Prototype		Uncrewed reentry test vehicle.
Buran Shuttle	USSR	Rocket launch	Utility	1988	Prototype		Crewed orbiter, launched by the Energia rocket. Only one robotic flight was made.
Dawn Aerospace Mk.2	The Netherlands / New Zealand	Suborbital rocket launch	Experimental	2020	Prototype		Uncrewed suborbital space plane. Horizontal takeoff and landing.
Dream Chaser	USA	Rocket launch	Utility	2004	Project		Uncrewed orbiter, originally intended as a crew vehicle. Launched by a Vulcan Centaur rocket.
HOTOL	UK	SSTO	Utility	1988	Project	0	Airbreathing rocket engine.
Interim HOTOL	UK	Air launch	Utility	1991	Project	0	Launched from the Antonov An-225 Mriya, the Buran air lift carrier aircraft.
Martin X-23 PRIME	USA	Rocket launch	Experimental	1966	Prototype		Uncrewed atmospheric re-entry test vehicle
North American X-15	USA	Air launch	Experimental	1959	Prototype	3	Air-dropped from a Boeing B-52.
Sanger Silbervogel	Germany	Composite	Bomber	1944	Project	0	Sub-orbital. Mockup and wind tunnel models only.
Scaled Composites SpaceShipOne	USA	Composite	Transport	2004	Prototype	1	First civilian-funded reusable spacecraft, lifted by White Knight to about 14 km
Scaled Composites SpaceShipTwo	USA	Composite	Transport	2010	Prototype	2	For Virgin Galactic commercial testing.
Skylon	UK	SSTO	Utility	1993	Project		Continuation of cancelled HOTOL.
Space Rider	ESA	Lifting body	Experimental	2021	Project		Robotic, orbital
Space Shuttle	USA	Rocket launch	Utility	1981	Retired	4–8	Crewed orbiter.
XCOR Lynx (formerly Xerus)	USA	Suborbital	Experimental	2008	Project	0	Horizontal takeoff and landing.
VORTEX	France, Germany	Rocket launch	Dual-use	2025	Project		Robotic, orbital

== See also ==
- Lists of spacecraft
- List of space launch system designs
- Mother ship
