= Thales Alenia Space =

European aerospace company

- Type: Joint venture
- Industry: Aerospace
- Predecessor: Alcatel Alenia Space
- Founded: 2007; 19 years ago
- Headquarters: Cannes, France
- Key people: Hervé Derrey (president and CEO)
- Operating income: €2.2 billion (2022)
- Owner: Thales Group (67%); Leonardo (33%)
- Number of employees: 8,500 (2022)
- Website: thalesaleniaspace.com

Thales Alenia Space (TAS) is an aerospace joint venture between the French corporation Thales Group (67%) and Italian conglomerate Leonardo (33%). It forms one half of their Space Alliance alongside Telespazio. TAS is headquartered in Cannes, France.

It designs, builds, and delivers space-based systems, including satellites, orbital infrastructure and ground segments, for telecommunications, earth observation, space exploration, meteorological and navigation purposes. It is a key contributor to Galileo, a European global satellite navigation system, being responsible for the ground segment in particular. In 2021, the company was also awarded a contract by the European Space Agency (ESA) and the European Commission to build 6 of the 12 new Galileo Second Generation satellites. The company is also a notable industrial contributor to the International Space Station (ISS), having produced numerous pressurized modules including the Cupola, the Harmony and Tranquility nodes, the Columbus laboratory and for the Cygnus cargo spacecraft; as well as an important industrial partner as to the development of the Lunar Gateway.

TAS has 17 industrial plants in Europe as well a joint venture in the United States, Leostella. This JV with the Seattle-based company, BlackSky Global, is mostly dedicated to the development of the BlackSky Pathfinder-1 high revisit optical constellation.

Plans have been announced to merge TAS, Telespazio and the Space Systems and Space Digital divisions of Airbus Defence and Space into a new joint venture owned by Airbus (35%), Leonardo (32.5%), and Thales (32.5%). The combined entity would have had an estimated annual turnover of €6.5 billion. If approved by regulators, the new company is expected to be operational in 2027.

== History ==
Thales Alenia Space was formed following Thales Group's decision to acquire Alcatel's shares in two existing Franco-Italian joint ventures with Finmeccanica: Alcatel Alenia Space and Telespazio.

Alcatel Alenia Space was established on 1 June 2005 through the merger of Alcatel Space and Alenia Spazio. The new company was owned by Alcatel-Lucent (67%) and Finmeccanica (33%). Its creation coincided with Alcatel taking a 33% stake in Finmeccanica's existing Telespazio subsidiary, which was combined with Alcatel's Space Services and Operations business.

On 5 April 2006, Alcatel announced plans to sell its stakes in both Alcatel Alenia Space and Telespazio to Thales. The European Commission approved the transaction on 10 April 2007 following a competition review. The same day, Thales announced the creation of a new space alliance with Finmeccanica.

According to a statement by Thales UK chief executive Alex Dorrian issued during 2007, Thales Alenia Space has actively sought out opportunities for both partnership and acquisition amongst other space enterprises. In December 2007, it was announced that Thales Alenia Space and Russian satellite specialist NPO PM have agreed to develop the new Express-4000 multi-mission satellite bus, which incorporates Russian equipment with a Thales-built payload. Since then, Thales Alenia Space has developed subcontracting relationships with North American aerospace companies, including Ball Aerospace and Boeing.

== Activities ==
Thales Alenia Space is a major European satellite specialist. These satellites range in purpose, from telecommunications to navigation, Earth observation and space exploration, including science and orbital infrastructures. Since 2007, the company has been regarded as the largest satellite manufacturer, in both the civilian and military sectors, in Europe.

In the mid-1990s, the United States stopped issuing export licenses for satellite components that will be launched on Chinese rockets, fearing that such launches would help China's military. In response, Thales Alenia developed a line of ITAR-free satellites that contained no restricted U.S. components. Between 2005 and 2012, numerous ITAR-free satellites, such as Apstar 6, Chinasat-6B, and Apstar 7, were launched on Chinese Long March launch vehicles. However, the United States Department of State disputed the ITAR-free status of these satellites, issuing a US$8 million fine to the American company Aeroflex for selling ITAR components. During 2013, Thales Alenia decided to discontinue its ITAR-free satellite line.

A major proportion of Thales Alenia Space's business is centered around the production of communications satellites, in which it is a world leader. During 2010, Thales Alenia Space received a US$2.9 billion fixed-price contract to manufacture a total of 81 satellites for Iridium Communications' NEXT satellite telephony network. It is also engaged in producing a separate batch of 24 satellites for Globalstar's second generation network. The company is also responsible for producing 6 satellites for Galileo second generation, a European global satellite navigation system (GSNS).

The company constructed the Multi-Purpose Logistics Modules, which were used to transport cargo inside the Space Shuttle orbiters. Thales Alenia Space also built several modules for the International Space Station (ISS): the Cupola, the Columbus structure, Harmony, Tranquility and Leonardo. After the American aerospace corporation Boeing, Thales Alenia Space was the second largest industrial provider to the ISS. It also built the pressure vessels for the Automated Transfer Vehicle (ATV) and Cygnus spacecraft. During the 2010s, Thales Alenia Space manufactured the Intermediate eXperimental Vehicle (IXV), a prototype suborbital spaceplane intended to validate work towards reusable launcher systems, acting as a stepping stone towards the Programme for Reusable In-orbit Demonstrator in Europe (PRIDE program) and the consequential Space Rider that harnesses IPX technology. It has also engaged with other space exploration efforts, such as proposed lunar cargo landing vehicle.

Since then, working with Avio, the company will build ESA's Space Rider reusable autonomous space transportation system, which draws on the heritage of the IXV demonstrator. The company will also be a key European partner onboard NASA's Artemis, aiming to bring physically astronauts back to the Moon in 2025. Thales Alenia Space will provide in particular three key modules for the Lunar Gateway space station. It will also deliver two pressurized modules for the Axiom commercial space station. Furthermore, Thales Alenia Space is developing a new line of on-orbit servicing spacecraft, capable of carrying out a wide range of operations in orbit, from satellite inspection and life extension, to robotic manipulation and deorbiting space debris. The company has also taken part to international space exploration missions across the Solar System such as Cassini-Huygens (Saturn exploration), ExoMars (Mars), BepiColombo (Mercury), Solar Orbiter (Sun), NASA' Orion probe (lunar exploration, part NASA's ARTEMIS), and many more. The company is also prime contractor for Euclid, ESA's science mission aimed to study the universe's dark matter and dark energy.

In the fields of telecommunications, Thales Alenia Space has launched 2 major product lines over the last 2 decades, dubbed Spacebus Neo and Space Inspire. Both based on platforms including electrical propulsion systems. Spacebus NEO is used for very high throughput satellites, helping bridge the digital divide across the globe. In 2022, EUTELSAT KONNECT VHTS satellite, for telecommunications operator Eutelsat, was successfully launched by Arianespace. Built by Thales Alenia Space, this Spacebus NEO satellite was said to be the most powerful and capacitive one ever built in Europe at that time. Its mission is to provide fiber-like high speed Internet over Europe, especially in isolated areas, called white zones. The launch of the second product line, Space Inspire, was announced in 2019. It is a compact and fully-digitalized solution that can be reconfigured in orbit. It will enable telecommunications operators to dynamically allocate capacity where and when needed, in any bandwidth. The company has been leading the geostationary telecommunications market in 2021 and in 2022, winning 60% of telecom satellites contracts available on the open market in 2022. The same year the company was awarded several contracts for 6 telecommunications satellites, including 5 based on its Space Inspire solution.

The company is also a lead player in Europe's Copernicus program, fully dedicated to environmental monitoring. In 2020, Thales Alenia Space was awarded five contracts for the six new Copernicus Expansion missions, as prime contractor for the CIMR, ROSE-L and CHIME satellites, and supplier of the CRISTAL and CO2M mission payloads. These new satellites will be used to measure the atmospheric carbon dioxide (CO_{2}) produced by human activity, monitor sea ice thickness and overlying snow depth, provide improved services for sustainable agriculture and biodiversity management, observe ocean behavior, and support precision agriculture and food security. The company has been the industrial prime contractor for 3 generations of Meteosat European weather satellites. Third generation MTG, Meteosat Third Generation, is still under development. This latest generation will include 6 satellites: 4 imaging ones and 2 atmospheric sounders. The first MTG imaging satellite, dubbed MTG-I1, was successfully launched by Arianespace late 2022. A few days after, it was the turn of SWOT oceanography satellite to be successfully orbited by SpaceX. Mostly built by Thales Alenia Space with contributions from NASA's Jet Propulsion Laboratory, the French-U.S. satellite, produced for French Space Agency, CNES, and NASA, is set to revolutionize oceanography and hydrology.

In the defense sector, a number of countries have chosen Thales Alenia Space for their military or dual telecommunications systems, providing front-line support for their armed forces in any theater of operations. In the market for space-based surveillance systems, Thales Alenia Space offers high and very-high resolution optical and radar payloads. The company is involved in numerous programs such as French Syracuse military satellites, Italian SICRAL, and many more.

Thales Alenia Space is also the exclusive supplier of very-high-resolution optical instruments for French intelligence satellites, including the optical payloads on Helios, Pleiades and CSO. Through the LeoStella joint venture in the United States, a JV between Thales Alenia Space and US-based company BlackSky, the company is also contributing to the BlackSky constellation, which will include 60 optical observation satellites featuring submetric resolution and very high revisit rates. The company is also the industrial prime contractor for the two generations of COSMO-SkyMed radar satellites for the Italian space agency and defense ministry.

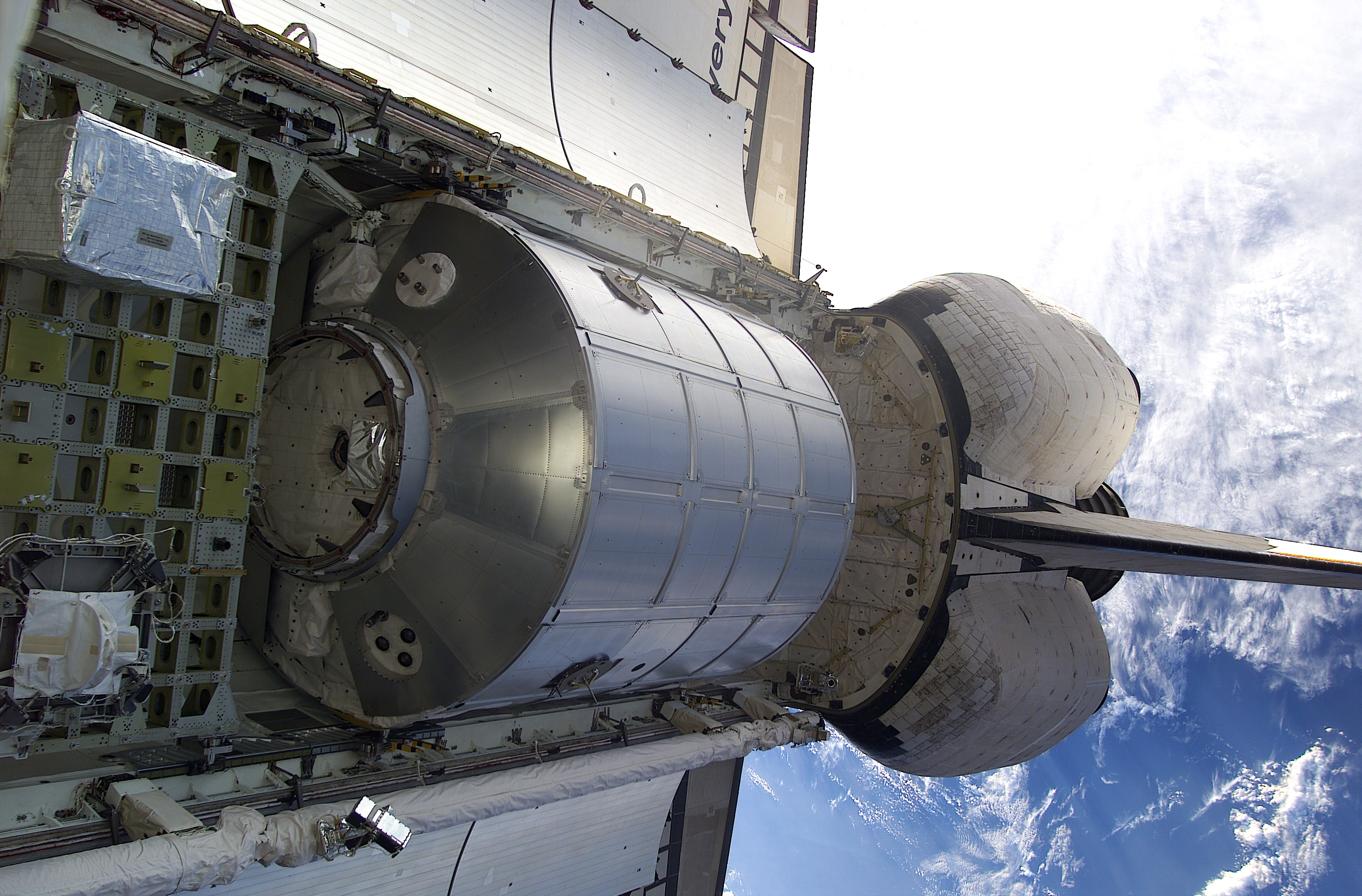
A Multi-Purpose Logistics Module inside Space Shuttle Discovery

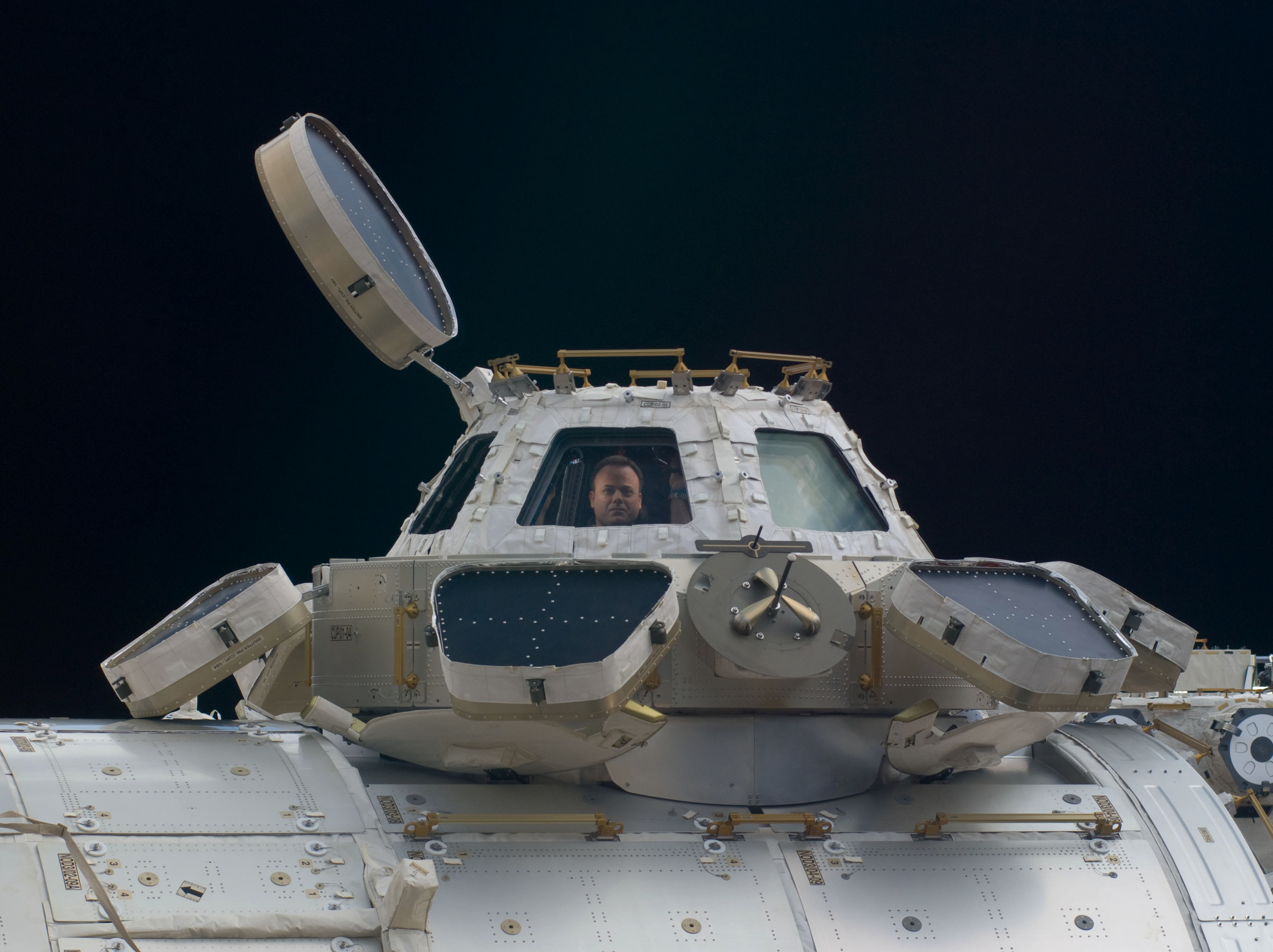
Cupola module

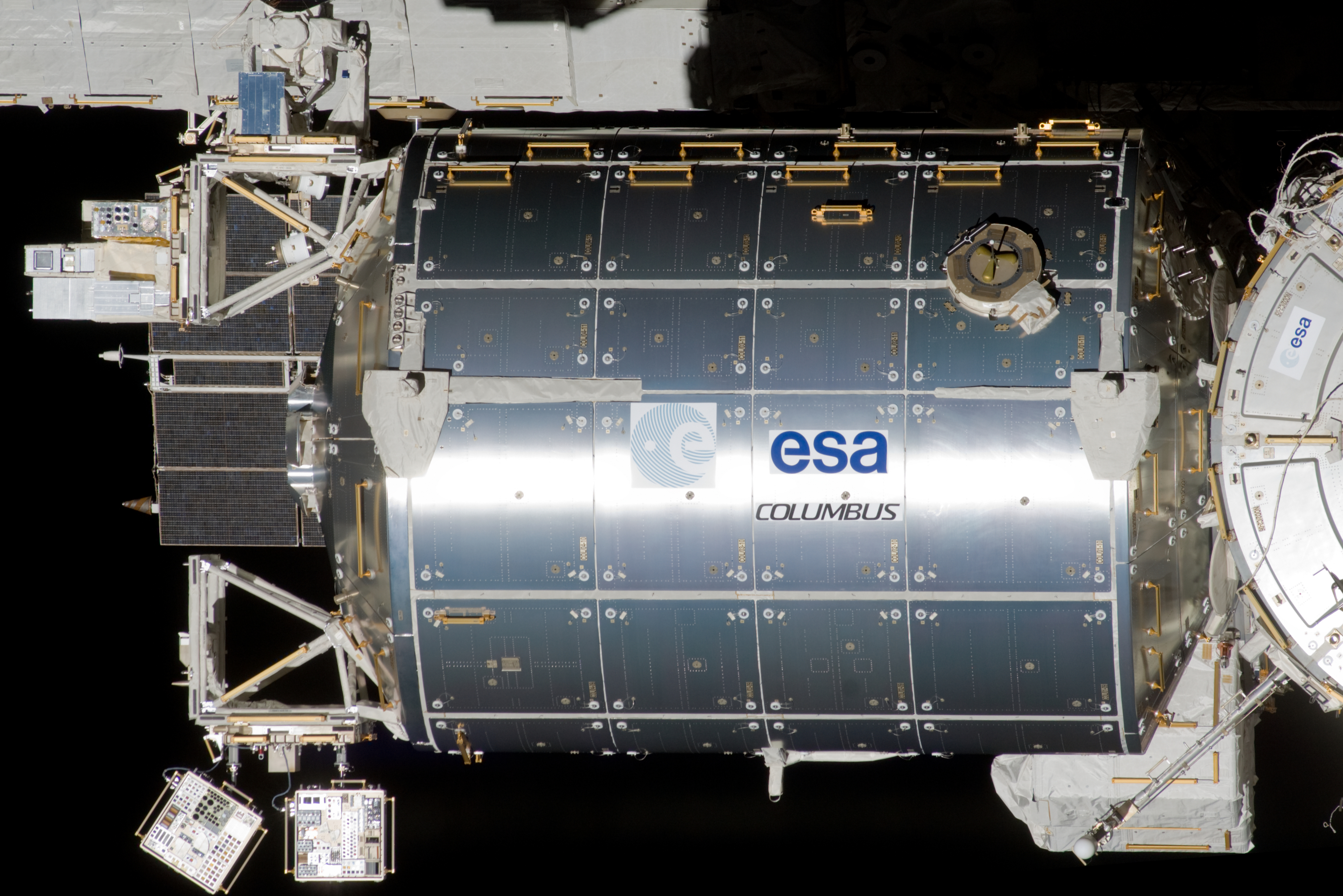
Columbus module

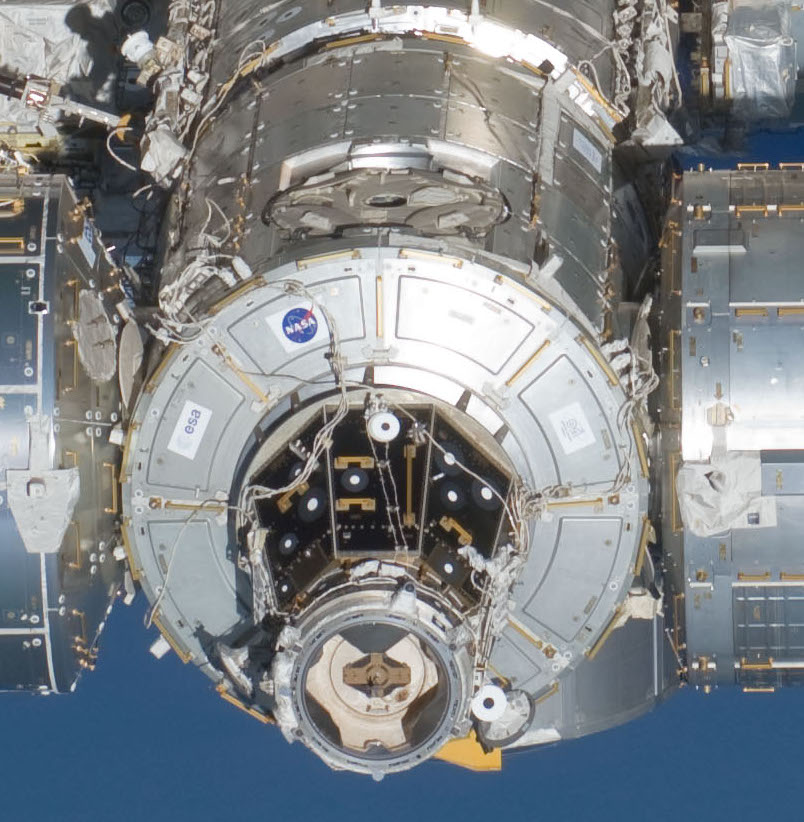
Harmony module (center)

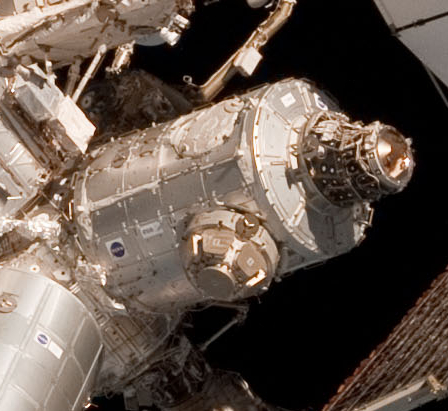
Tranquility module (center)

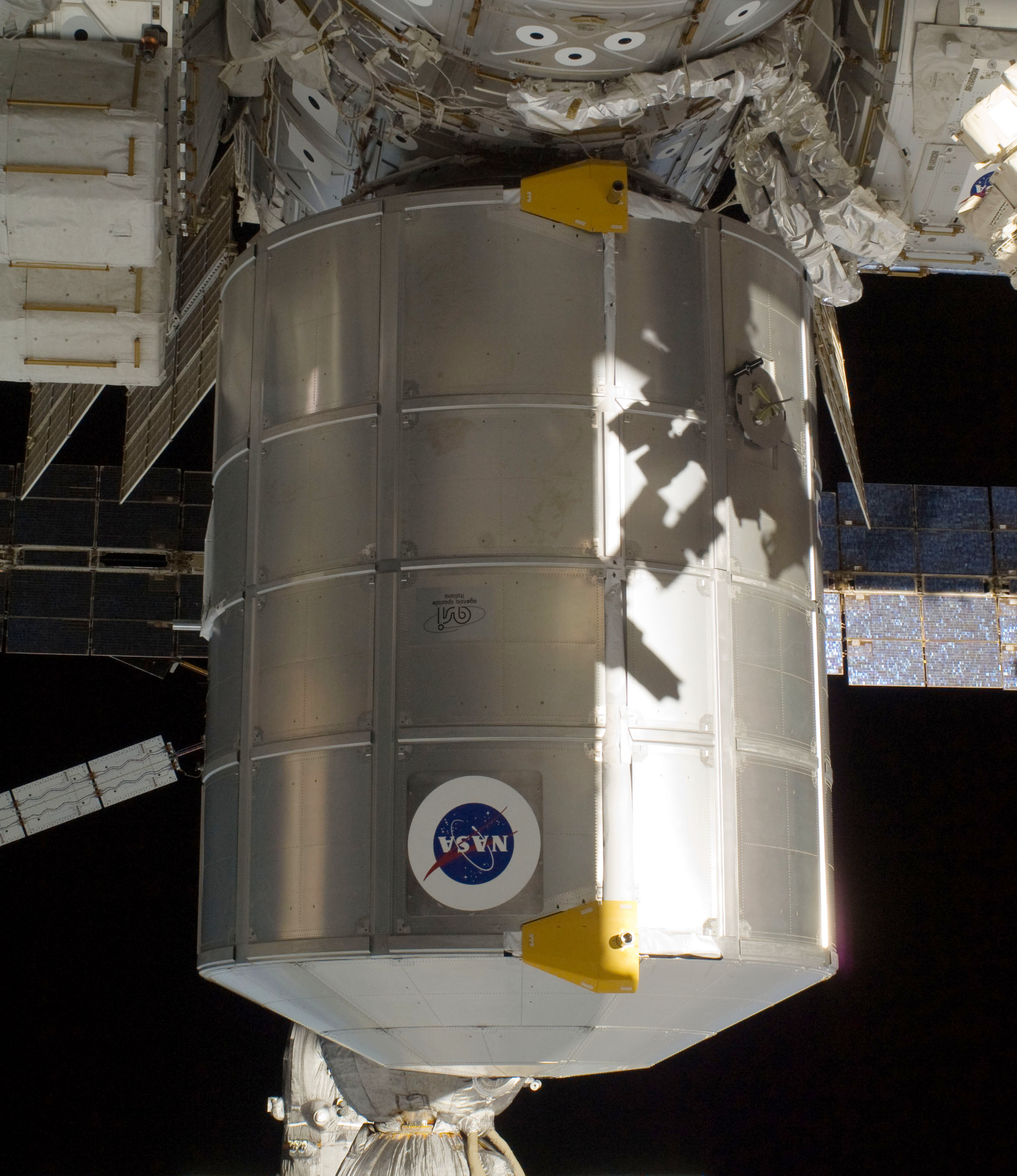
Leonardo module

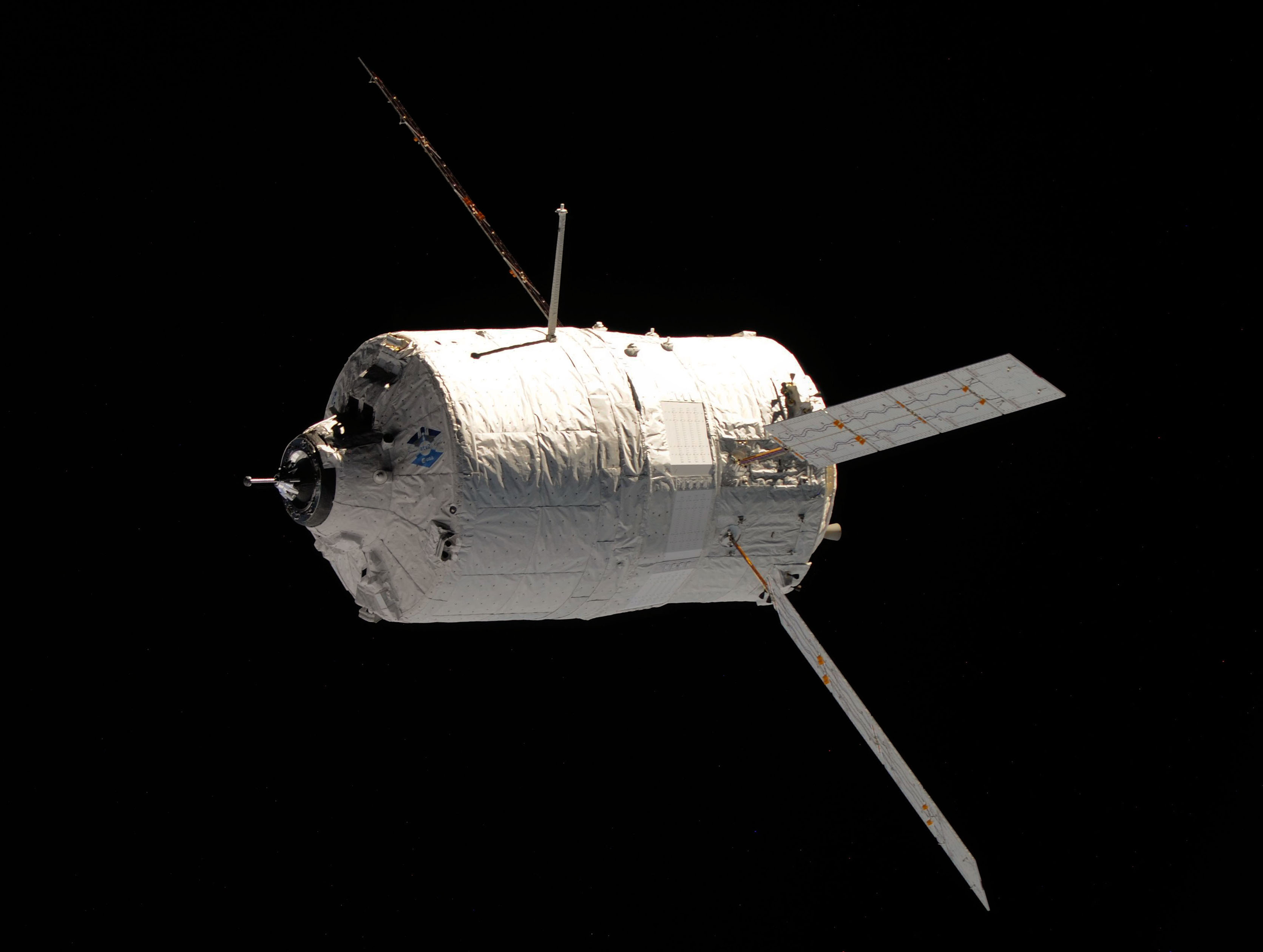
Automated Transfer Vehicle

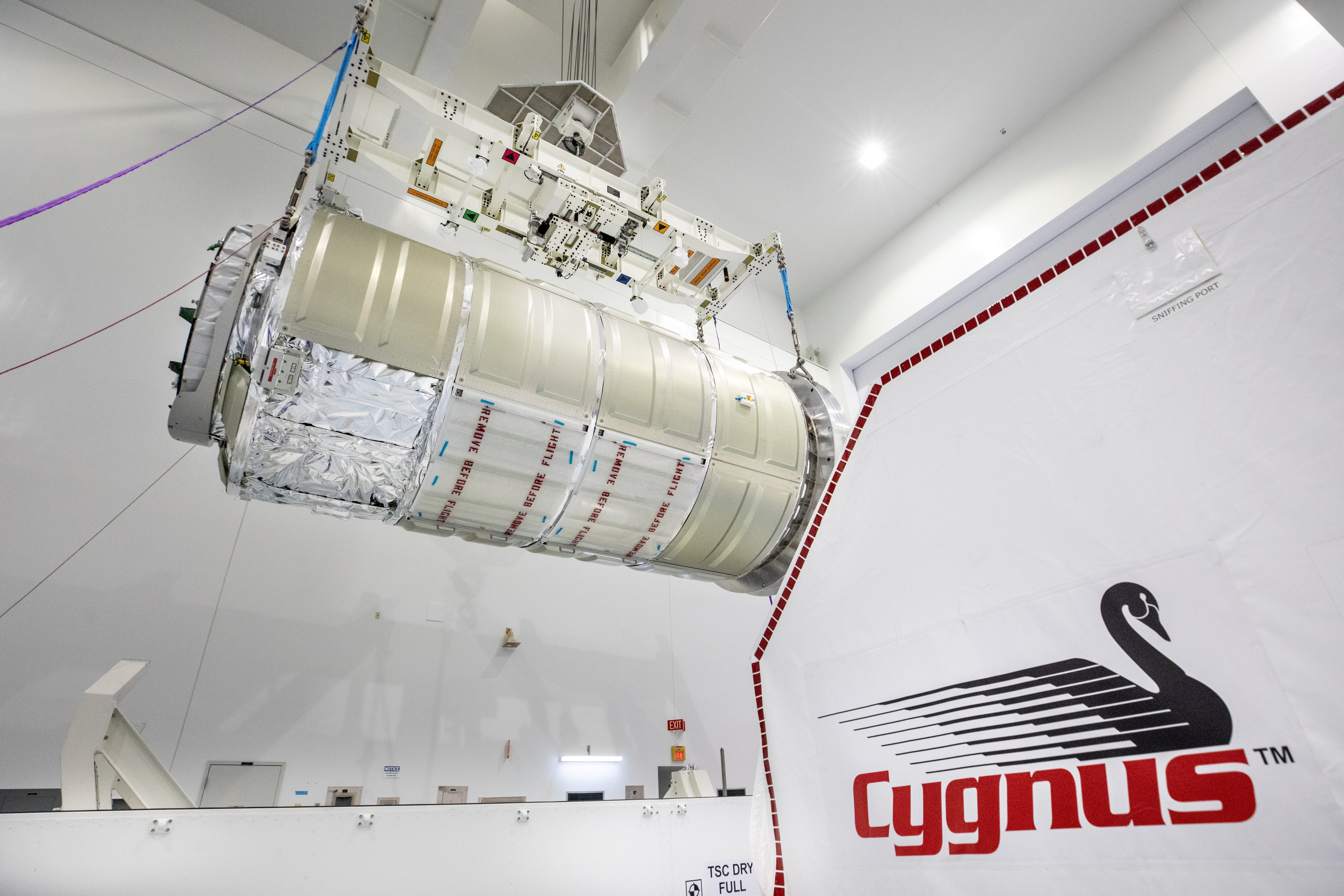
Pressurized vessel for the Cygnus spacecraft

== Locations ==
In 2021, Thales Alenia Space had 8,000 employees operating in 17 industrial sites located in nine European countries (France, Italy, Spain, Belgium, United Kingdom, Germany, Switzerland, Poland, Luxembourg):

- Cannes, France (also hosts the company's headquarters in the Cannes Mandelieu Space Center)
- Toulouse, France
- Rome, Italy (Saccomuro and Tiburtina)
- Turin, Italy
- L'Aquila, Italy
- Gorgonzola, Italy
- Charleroi, Belgium (Thales Alenia Space ETCA (acronym of « Études Techniques et Constructions Aérospatiales ») )
- Leuven, Belgium
- Hasselt, Belgium
- Madrid (Tres Cantos), Spain
- Stuttgart (Ditzingen), Germany
- Harwell, United Kingdom
- Bristol, United Kingdom
- Belfast, United Kingdom
- Warsaw, Poland
- Zurich, Switzerland
- Luxembourg City, Luxembourg (Digital Center of Excellence opened in 2021)

== Executive Board ==
Current CEO is Hervé Derrey since February 2020, replacing Jean-Loïc Galle.

== See also ==
- Cannes Mandelieu Space Center
- French space program
