= Intermediate eXperimental Vehicle =

ESA re-entry vehicle prototype

- Artist's view of IXV reentry phase
- Mission type: technology demonstration
- Operator: ESA
- Website: ESA Reentry technologies
- Apogee: 412 km (256 mi)

Spacecraft properties
- Spacecraft type: lifting body
- Manufacturer: Thales Alenia Space
- Launch mass: 1,800 kg (4,000 lb)

Start of mission
- Launch date: 13:40, 11 February 2015 (UTC)
- Rocket: Vega
- Launch site: Guiana Space Centre ELV

End of mission
- Landing date: 11 February 2015
- Landing site: Pacific Ocean

The Intermediate eXperimental Vehicle (IXV) is a European Space Agency (ESA) experimental suborbital re-entry vehicle. It was developed to serve as a prototype lifting body orbital return vehicle to validate the ESA's work in the field of reusable orbital return vehicles.

The European Space Agency has a program called Future Launchers Preparatory Programme (FLPP), which made a call for submissions for a reusable spaceplane. One of the submissions was by the Italian Space Agency, that presented their own Programme for Reusable In-orbit Demonstrator in Europe (PRIDE program) which went ahead to develop an initial test vehicle, Pre-X, followed the prototype named Intermediate eXperimental Vehicle (IXV) and the consequential Space Rider that inherits technology from its prototype IXV.

On 11 February 2015, the IXV conducted its first 100-minute suborbital space flight, successfully completing its mission upon landing intact on the surface of the Pacific Ocean. The vehicle is the first ever lifting body to perform full atmospheric reentry from orbital speed. Past missions have flight tested either winged bodies, which are highly controllable but also very complex and costly, or capsules, which are difficult to control but offer less complexity and lower cost.

== Development ==
=== Background ===
During the 1980s and 1990s, there was significant international interest in the development of reusable launch platforms and reusable spacecraft, particularly in respect to spaceplanes, perhaps the most high-profile examples of these being the American Space Shuttle and Soviet Buran programmes. The national space agencies of European nations, such as France's Centre National d'Études Spatiales (CNES) and Germany's German Aerospace Center (DLR), worked on their own designs during this era, the most prominent of these to emerge being the Hermes spaceplane. Development of the Hermes programme, which was backed by the European Space Agency (ESA) for several years, was ultimately terminated in 1992 prior to any flights being performed in favour of a partnership arrangement with the Russian Aviation and Space Agency (RKA) to use the existing Soyuz spacecraft instead.

While work on the development of the Hermes vehicle was cancelled during the early 1990s, the ESA maintained its strategic long-term objective to indigenously develop and eventually deploy similar reusable space vehicles. Accordingly, in support of this goal, the ESA embarked upon a series of design studies on different experimental vehicle concepts as well as to refine and improve technologies deemed critical to future reentry vehicles. In order to test and further develop the technologies and concepts produced by these studies, there were clear needs to accumulate practical flight experience with reentry systems, as well as to maintain and expand upon international cooperation in the fields of space transportation, exploration, and science. Out of these desires emerged the Future Launchers Preparatory Programme (FLPP), an ESA-headed initiative conceived and championed by a number of its member states, which provided a framework for addressing the challenges and development of the technology associated with reentry vehicles.

It was recognised that, in order for significant progress to be made, FLPP would require the production and testing of a prototype reentry vehicle that drew on their existing research, technologies, and designs. By adopting a step-by-step approach using a series of test vehicles prior to the development of a wider series of production vehicles, this approach was seen to reduce the risk and to allow for the integration of progressively more sophisticated developments from the early relatively-low-cost missions.

In line with this determination, during early 2005, the Intermediate eXperimental Vehicle (IXV) project was formally initiated by the Italian Space Agency and the Italian Aerospace Research Centre under an Italian programme named PRIDE (Programme for Reusable In-orbit Demonstrator in Europe) Their main industrial contractor was Next Generation Launcher Prime SpA (NGLP) in Italy. The latter organisation is a joint venture entity comprising two major European aerospace companies, Astrium and Finmeccanica. The PRIDE programme had the support of various national space agencies, including the European Space Research and Technology Centre, Italian Space Agency (ASI), French space agency CNES, and Germany's DLR; by November 2006, the IXV was supported by 11 Member States: Austria, Belgium, France, Germany, Ireland, Italy, Portugal, Spain, Sweden, Switzerland, and the Netherlands. Of these, Italy emerged as the principal financial backer of the IXV programme.

=== Selection and pre-launch testing ===
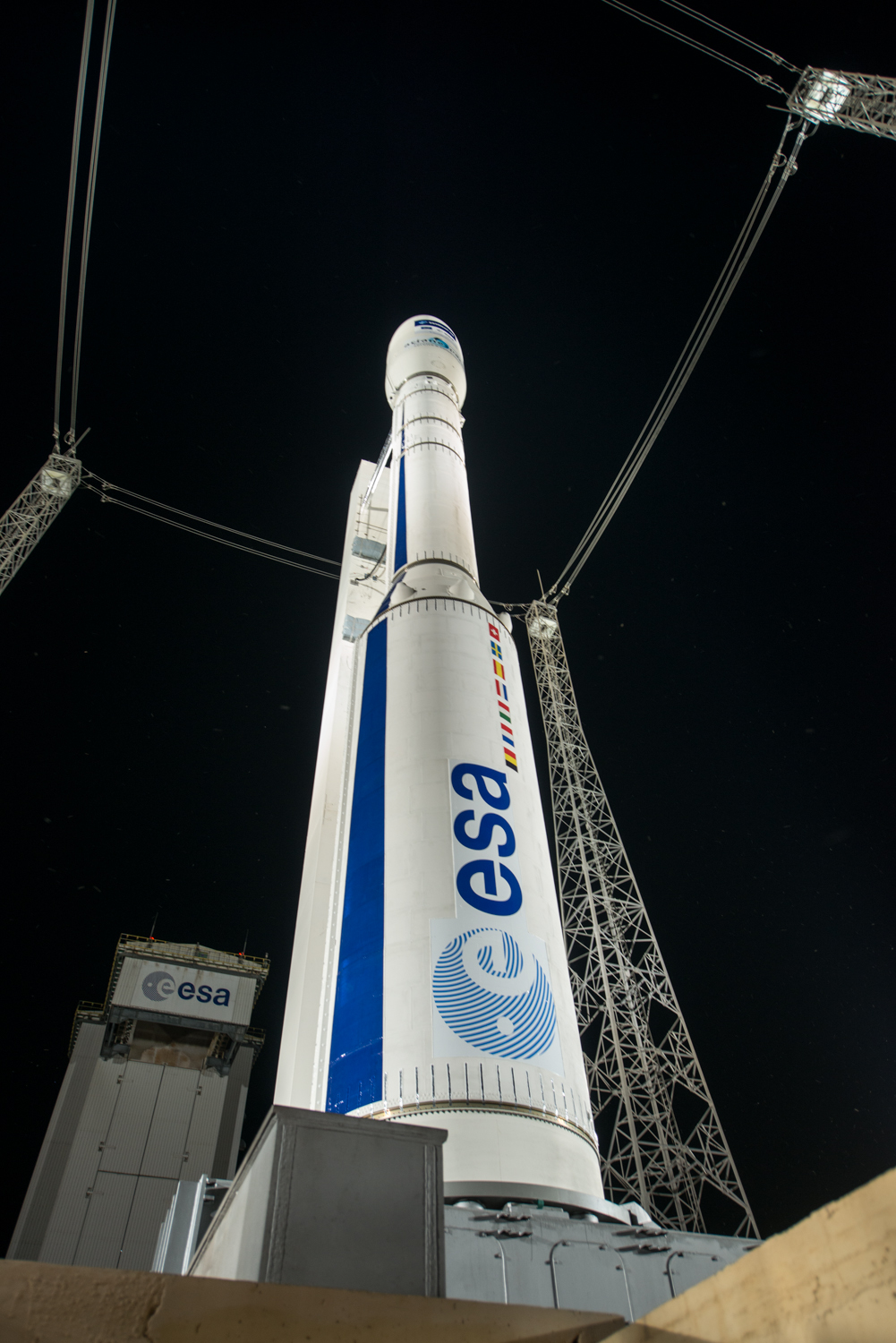
Vega rocket

The IXV project benefitted from and harnessed much of the research data and operational principles from many of the previously conducted studies, especially from the successful Atmospheric Reentry Demonstrator (ARD), which was test-flown during 1998. Early on, during the mission definition and design maturity stages of the project, thorough comparisons were conducted again between existing ESA and national concepts against shared criteria, aimed at evaluating the experiment requirements (technology and systems), programme requirements (technology readiness, development schedule and cost) and risk mitigation (feasibility, maturity, robustness, and growth potential). The selected baseline design, a slender lifting body configuration, drew primarily upon the CNES-led Pre-X the ESA's ARD vehicles. Development work quickly proceeded through the preliminary design definition phase, reaching a system requirements review by mid-2007.

On 18 December 2009, the ESA announced the signing of a contract with Thales Alenia Space, valued at €39,400,000, to cover 18 months of preliminary IXV work. In 2011, the total estimated cost for the IXV project was reportedly €150,000,000.

During late 2012, the IXV's subsonic parachute system was tested at the Yuma Proving Ground in Arizona, United States. Shortly thereafter, a series of water impact tests were conducted at Consiglio Nazionale delle Ricerche's INSEAN research tank near Rome, Italy.

On 21 June 2013, an IXV test vehicle was dropped from an altitude of 3 km (1.9 mi) in the Salto di Quirra range off Sardinia, Italy. The purpose of this test-drop was to validate the vehicle's water-landing system, including the subsonic parachute, flotation balloons, and beacon deployment. A small anomaly was encountered during the inflation of the balloons; however, all of the other systems performed as expected. Following the drop-test, the vehicle was retrieved for further analysis. On 23 June 2014, the recovery ship Nos Aries conducted a training exercise involving a single IXV test article off the coast of Tuscany.

During June 2014, the IXV test vehicle arrived at the ESTEC Technical Centre in Noordwijk, The Netherlands, to undergo a test campaign to confirm its flight readiness in anticipation of a flight on a Vega rocket, which was by that point scheduled to occur during November of that year.

== Design ==
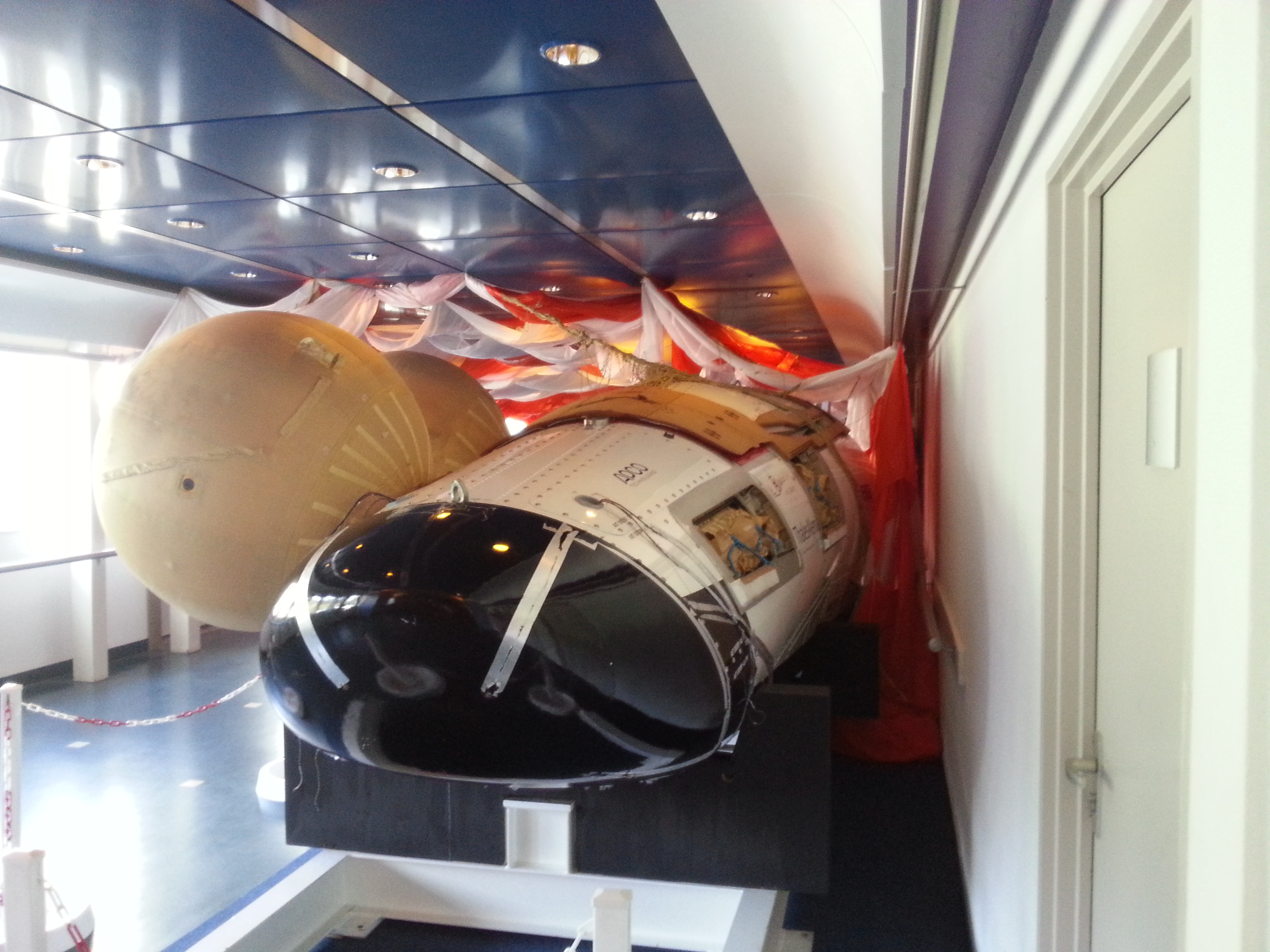
Frontal view of the vehicle

The Intermediate eXperimental Vehicle (IXV) is a prototype uncrewed reusable spaceplane and the precursor of the next model called Space Rider. According to the ESA, the Intermediate part of its name is due to the shape of the vehicle not necessarily being representative of the envisioned follow-on production spacecraft. It possesses a lifting body arrangement which lacks wings of any sort, resulting in a lift-to-drag ratio (L/D) of 0.7 during the reentry. The size and shape are balanced between the need to maximise internal volume to accommodate experimental payloads while keeping within the mass limits of the Vega launcher and favourable centre of gravity. The vehicle purposefully uses several key technologies of interest to the ESA, including its thermal protection system and the presence of active aerodynamic control surfaces. Control and manoeuvrability of the IXV are provided by a combination of these aerodynamic surfaces (comprising a pair of movable flaps) and thrusters throughout its full flight regime, which includes flying at hypersonic speeds.

A key role for the IXV is the gaining of data and experience in aerodynamically controlled reentry, which has been claimed by the ESA to represent significant advances on earlier ballistic and quasi-ballistic techniques previously employed. Throughout each mission, representative reentry performance data is recorded in order to investigate aerothermodynamic phenomena and to validate system design tools and ground verification methods, which in turn supports future design efforts. Reentry is accomplished in a nose-high attitude, similar to the NASA-operated Space Shuttle; during this phase of flight, manoeuvring of the spaceplane is accomplished by rolling out-of-plane and then lifting in that direction, akin to a conventional aircraft. Landing is accomplished by an arrangement of parachutes, which are ejected during the descent through the top of the vehicle; additionally, seconds prior to landing, a series of airbags are inflated to soften the landing.

Another key ESA objective for the IXV was the verification of both its structure and its advanced thermal protection measures, specifically their performance during the challenging conditions present during reentry. The underside is covered by ceramic thermal-protection panels composed of a blend of carbon fiber and silicon carbide directly fixed to the spaceplane's structure, while ablative materials comprising a cork and silicone-based composite material coat the vehicle's upper surfaces. The airframe was based on a traditional hot-structure/cold-structure arrangement, relying upon a combination of advanced ceramic and metallic assemblies, insulating materials, as well as the effective design of assorted attachments, junctions and seals; the role played by advanced navigation and control techniques was also deemed to be of high importance.

The IXV is supported on-orbit by a separate manoeuvring and support module, which is largely similar to the Resource Module that had been intended for use by the cancelled Hermes shuttle. The avionics of the IXV are controlled by a LEON2-FT microprocessor and are interconnected by a MIL-STD-1553B serial bus.

As an experimental vehicle primarily intended to gather data, various assorted sensors and monitoring equipment were present and operational throughout the full length of the flight in order to gather data to support the evaluation effort, including the verification of the vehicle's critical reentry technologies. The recorded data covered various elements of the IXV's flight, including its guidance, navigation, and control systems, such as Vehicle Model Identification (VMI) measurements for post-flight reconstruction of the spacecraft's dynamic behaviour and environment, as well as the mandatory core experiments regarding its reentry technologies. Additionally, the IXV will typically carry complementary passenger experiments which, while not having been directly necessary to its mission success, serve to increase the vehicle's return on investment; according to the ESA, in excess of 50 such proposals had been received from a mixture of European industries, research institutes and universities, many having benefits to future launcher programmes (such as potential additional methods for guidance, navigation, control, structural health monitoring, and thermal protection), space exploration, and scientific value. Throughout each mission, telemetry is broadcast to ground controllers to monitor the vehicle's progress; however, phenomenon such as the build-up of plasma around the spaceplane during its re-entry has been known to block radio signals.

The IXV is the precursor of the next model named Space Rider, also developed under the Italian PRIDE programme for ESA.

== Flight test ==
During 2011, it was reported that the IXV was planned to conduct its maiden flight as early as 2013; however, the vehicle was later rescheduled to perform its first launch using the newly developed Vega launcher during late 2014. This initial launch window was ultimately missed due to unresolved range safety concerns.

Following some delays, on 11 February 2015 the IXV was successfully launched into a suborbital trajectory by a Vega rocket on the VV04 mission. Having launched at 08:40am local time, the vehicle separated from the Vega launch vehicle at 333 km altitude and ascended to 412 km, after which it commenced a controlled descent towards beginning its reentry at 120 km altitude, travelling at a recorded speed of 7.5 km/s, identical to a typical re-entry path to be flown by low Earth orbit (LEO) spacecraft. Following re-entry, the IXV glided over the Pacific Ocean prior to the opening of its landing parachutes, which were deployed in order to slow down the craft's descent, having flown over 7300 km from the beginning of its reentry. The vehicle descended to the surface of the Pacific Ocean, where it was subsequently recovered by the Nos Aries ship; analysis of both the spacecraft itself and recorded mission data took place. Jean-Jacques Dordain, then-director general of the ESA, stated of the mission: "It couldn't have been better, but the mission itself is not yet over... it will move the frontiers of knowledge further back concerning aerodynamics, thermal issues, and guidance and navigation of such a vehicle – this lifting body".

== Future plans ==
Following on from the completion of the reportedly "flawless" test flight, ESA officials decided that an additional test flight should be performed during the 2019–2020 timeframe. During this mission, the IXV had been envisioned to land in a different manner, descending directly onto a runway instead of performing a splashdown landing as before; this approach is to be achieved either via the installation of a parafoil, or by the adoption of landing gear. The planning for the second spaceflight was originally to begin during March 2015, while design work on the modified vehicle was to commence during mid 2015.

=== Transition to Space Rider ===
In the ESA December 2016 Science Budget funding was approved by the Ministerial Council for the next IXV flight in the form of the commercialised Space Rider orbital vehicle. Following design reviews in 2018 and 2019, a full size mockup was to be dropped from a balloon in 2019 and will have a first flight atop a Vega-C in 2020/2021. It will then conduct approximately 5 science flights at 6 to 12-month intervals before becoming commercially available from 2025 at a cost of $40,000 per kg of payload for launch, operation, and return to Earth. The Space Rider mini shuttle will have a length of between 4 and 5 meters, a payload capacity of 800 kg, a total mass of 2,400 kg, and endurance of 2 to 6-month missions at a 400 km orbit before returning to Earth and being reflown within 4 months. The Vega-C rocket's 4th stage payload dispenser AVUM acts as the service module for the shuttle, providing orbital manoeuvring and braking, power, and communications before being jettisoned for re-entry. The AVUM service module replaces the integrated IXV Propulsion Module and frees 0.8 m^{3} of internal space in the vehicle for a payload bay. The Space Rider is similar in operation to the US X-37B but half the X37's length and a fifth the X37's mass and payload capacity, which will make it the smallest and lightest spaceplane to ever fly. Payload doors will be opened on achieving orbit exposing instruments and experiments to space before being closed for landing.

In December 2020, ESA signed contracts with co-prime contractors Thales Alenia Space and Avio for delivery of the Space Rider flight model. The first flight is now scheduled for 2028.

== Specifications ==
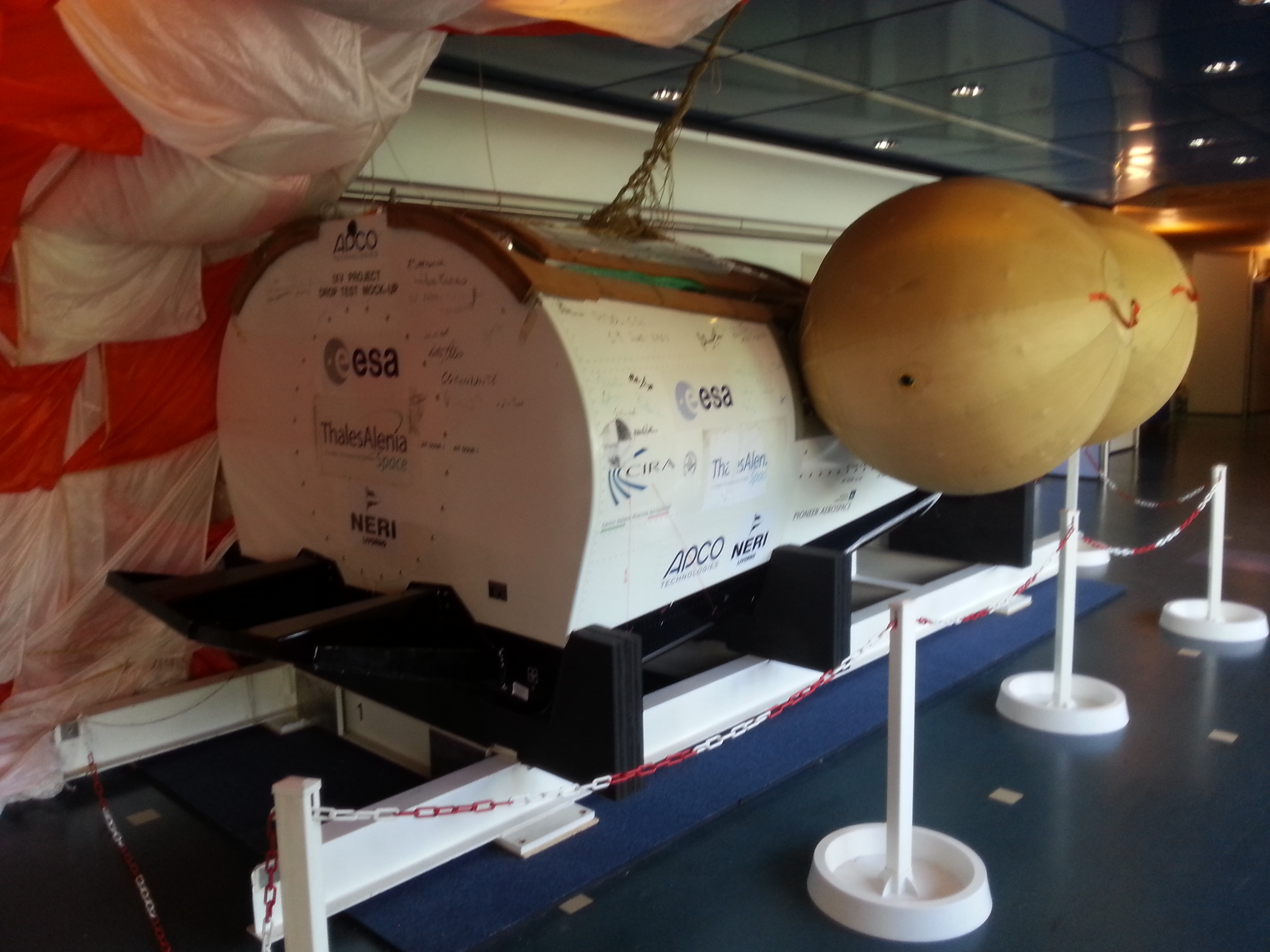
Drop-test model of the IXV with the flotation balloons inflated, as displayed in ESA ESTEC. The flaps in this model cannot move.

Data from ESA, Space.com, Gunter's Space Page

General characteristics

- Length: 5 m (16 ft 5 in)
- Wingspan: 2.2 m (7 ft 3 in)
- Height: 1.5 m (4 ft 11 in)
- Empty weight: 480 kg (1,058 lb)
- Gross weight: 1,900 kg (4,189 lb)
- Power: Batteries

Performance

- Maximum speed: 27,720 km/h (17,220 mph, 14,970 kn)
- Range: 7,500 km (4,700 mi, 4,000 nmi)
- Lift-to-drag: 0.7
- Max altitude: 412 km (256 mi)

== See also ==
- 2015 in spaceflight
- Atmospheric Reentry Demonstrator (ARD) – ESA re-entry testbed flown in 1998
- European eXPErimental Re-entry Testbed (EXPERT) – research programme developing materials used in IXV, never flown
- Future Launchers Preparatory Programme – parent programme for IXV
- Hopper – an earlier ESA project for a crewed spaceplane, cancelled
- HYFLEX (Hypersonic Flight Experiment) – equivalent Japanese spaceplane demonstrator for HOPE-X developed and flown by NASDA in 1996
- RLV-TD – Indian reusable technology validation test bed, in development by ISRO
- Space Rider – orbital spaceplane developed from IXV technologies
- List of European Space Agency programmes and missions
