= Giulio Ranzo =

Italian entrepreneur

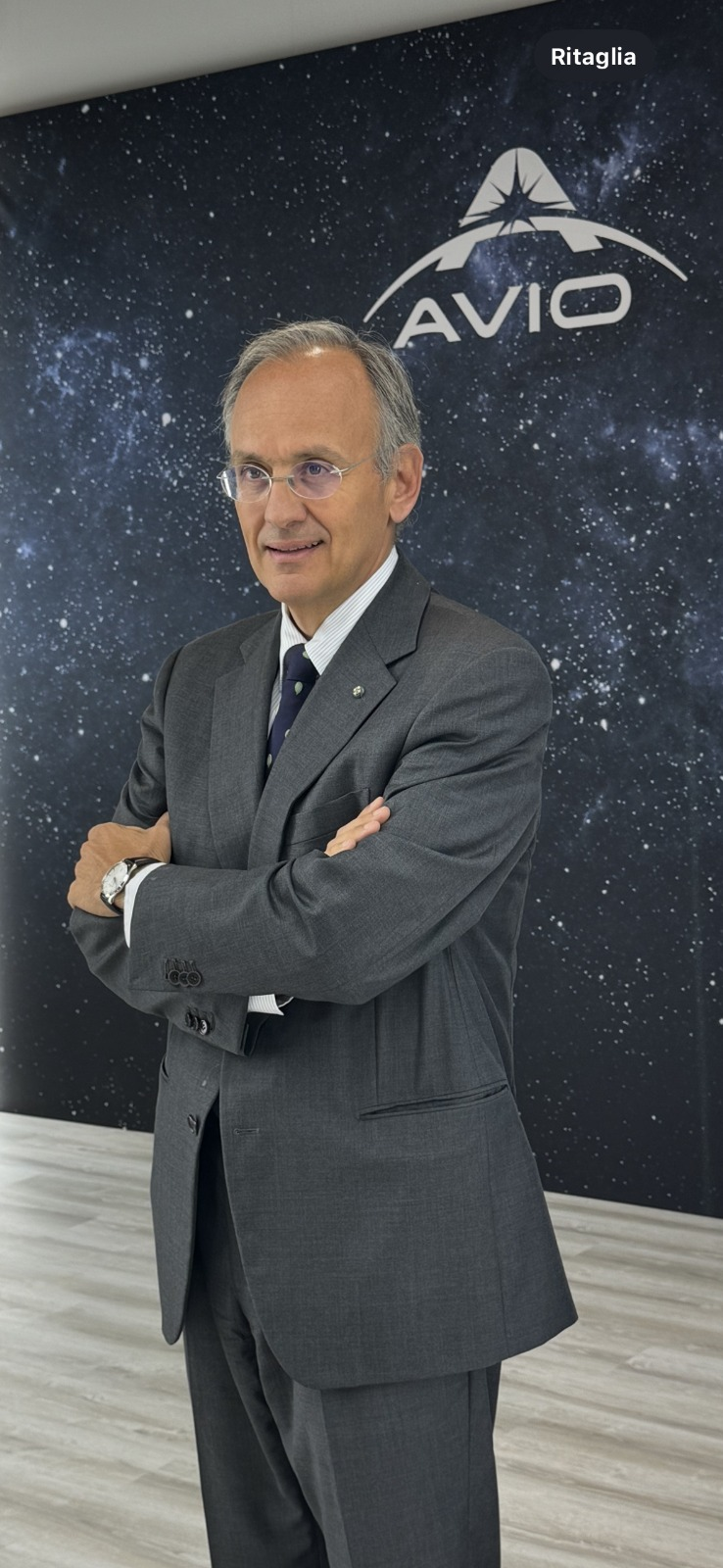
- Born: January 29, 1971 (age 54); Rome, Italy
- Education: University of Rome “La Sapienza”
- Occupation: CEO of Italian aerospace company Avio

Giulio Ranzo (born 29 January 1971, Rome) is an Italian civil engineer, executive, CEO of Italian aerospace company Avio, and a board member of Arianespace SA. As of 2024, Giulio manages the development of Vega C and Vega E rocket projects.

== Biography ==
Ranzo Giulio was born on 29 January 1971 in Rome, Italy. Giulio graduated cum laude in Civil Engineering at the University of Rome “La Sapienza”. Afterwards, he participated in a joint program between “La Sapienza” University and the University of California San Diego (UCSD) that allowed him to achieve a PhD in Structural Engineering.

From 1996 to 1999, he continued his academic career as a Graduate Research Assistant and Development Engineer at the University of California, San Diego. During that time, he has co-authored a number of scientific publications in the domain of Structural Engineering. The post-academic career of Giulio Ranzo started in the private sector at Booz Allen Hamilton, where he worked from 2000 to 2007 as Associate, Senior Associate and Principal within the Global Aerospace&Defense practice. In 2007, he became co-general manager and CFO of the Italian activities of Cementir Holding an international group operating in the building materials industry.

In 2011, Giulio was appointed by Avio as Senior Vice President Corporate Strategy of the Avio Group and worked on the de-merger of the aero-engine business, which was sold to General Electric in 2013. From 2014 to 2015, he supported the post-merger integration with GE Aviation.

Since October 2015, Ranzo is CEO of Avio. In 2016, Giulio founded In-Orbit SpA, an investment vehicle through which he co-invested with 50 Avio managers, acquiring a 4% share of Avio's capital. In 2017, he contributed to listing Avio on the Milan Stock Exchange on the STAR segment.

In 2022, Giulio completed the development and launch of the Vega C rocket, which is designed to carry heavier payloads into orbit than its predecessor Vega.

In 2024, Giulio signed a contract with the European Space Agency to complete the development of the successor of Vega C (Vega E).
