= Hopper (spacecraft) =

1990s European proposal of a robotic spaceplane

- Country: ESA
- Contract award: EADS, German Aerospace Center
- Status: Canceled

Hopper was a proposed European Space Agency (ESA) orbital spaceplane and reusable launch vehicle. The Hopper was a FESTIP (Future European Space Transportation Investigations Programme) system study design.

Hopper was one of several proposals for a reusable launch vehicle (RLV) developed by the ESA. The proposed reusable launch vehicles were to be used for the inexpensive delivery of satellite payloads into orbit as early as 2015. A prototype of Hopper, known as (EADS) Phoenix, was a German-led European project which involved the construction and testing of a one-seventh scale model of the proposed Hopper. On 8 May 2004, a single test flight of the Phoenix was conducted at the North European Aerospace Test range in Kiruna, Sweden, which was followed by more tests later that month.

== Development ==
=== Background ===
From the 1980s onwards, there was growing international interest in the development of reusable spacecraft; at the time, only the superpowers of the era, the Soviet Union and the United States, had developed this capability. European nations such as the United Kingdom and France embarked on their own national programs to produce spaceplanes, such as HOTOL and Hermes, while attempting to attract the backing of the multinational European Space Agency (ESA). While these programs ultimately did not garner enough support to continue development, there was still demand within a number of the ESA's member states to pursue the development of reusable space vehicles. During the 1990s, in addition to the development and operation of several technology demonstrator programs, such as the Atmospheric Reentry Demonstrator (ARD), the ESA were also working on the production of a long-term framework for the eventual development of a viable reusable spacecraft, known as the Future Launchers Preparatory Programme (FLPP).

Under FLPP, the ESA and European industrial partners performed detailed investigations of several partially-reusable launch vehicle concepts; the aim of the program was to prepare a suitable vehicle to, upon a favorable decision by the ESA's member-nations, proceed with the production of a Next Generation Launcher (NGL). A total of four launch concepts were studied: the Horizontal Take-Off (HTO) Hopper, the Vertical Take-Off (VTO) Hopper, the Reusable First Stage (RFS), and the liquid fly-back booster. Each of these concept vehicles consisted of a reusable winged booster, which was paired with an expendable upper stage, to deliver a payload in geostationary transfer orbit.

The HTO Hopper variant was designed for horizontal take-off, the first portion of which was to be achieved via a rocket sled arrangement. It possessed a relatively conventional wing-body configuration, although one atypical feature was the nose of the spacecraft, which possessed a deliberately low camber so that the required size of the elevons for desired trim functionality could be reduced while also resulting in an improved internal structure, such as in the accommodation of the nose gear. Aerodynamically, the HTO Hopper configuration features a rounded delta planform wing at a 60-degree leading edge sweep, which was matched with a central vertical stabilizer and a flat-bottomed underside for the purpose of maximizing the spacecraft's performance during hypersonic flight.

The alternative VTO Hopper variant was designed for vertical take-off, being launched conventionally via an expendable launch system. It featured a relatively traditional slender missile-like body but differed in the presence of a small delta wing at a 45-degree leading edge sweep and a central vertical stabilizer arrangement. In terms of its structure, the VTO Hopper possessed a circular cross section complete with a loft fillet on the underside of the craft which functioned to accommodate both the wings and body flap; it also featured a booster which was designed to carry the payload upon the nose of the fuselage. Studies determined that both the HTO and the VTO variant concepts possessed a relatively similar reentry load environment.

=== HTO Hopper - Selection ===
The HTO Hopper was adopted for further development work under another ESA initiative in the form of the FESTIP (Future European Space Transportation Investigations Programme) system design study. During 1998, it was decided that the design of Hopper fulfilled all of the established requirements. At this point, the spacecraft was to be composed of a single-stage reusable vehicle which would not attain orbital velocity itself. Hopper reportedly held the promise of delivering lower cost orbital deployment of payloads. An EADS spokesperson stated that a reusable launch vehicle like Hopper could halve the cost of sending a satellite into orbit, which reportedly had been determined to be around US$15,000 per kilogram of payload in 2004.

The envisioned mission profile of Hopper would have involved several phases. The launch phase was to be achieved by using a 4 km magnetic horizontal track, which was to be purpose-built at the Guiana Space Centre in French Guiana, that would accelerate the spacecraft up to launch speed. Upon reaching an altitude of 130 km, the vehicle would fire an expendable rocket-powered upper stage to attain orbital speed; once it had achieved the necessary height and speed, it would have released its satellite payload, which would independently ascend higher still to reach the desired orbit. Reportedly, Hopper was designed to deliver 7.5 tonne satellites into an orbit of 130 km above the surface of the Earth. Following the release of its payload, the vehicle would have then glided down in a controller descent. It was intended that the spacecraft would land at a predetermined island facility in the Atlantic Ocean, after which it would have been transported back to French Guiana by ship for further flights.

Multinational aerospace conglomerate EADS was responsible for the project management of Hopper, as well as for the development of the project's software-based elements. A number of other partner companies were also involved in the spacecraft's development. Reportedly, both the ESA and EADS had originally intended to complete development of Hopper between 2015 and 2020. After the first glide test using the Phoenix prototype in May 2004, no further updates on the programme were forthcoming; it is believed that work on Hopper has been discontinued.

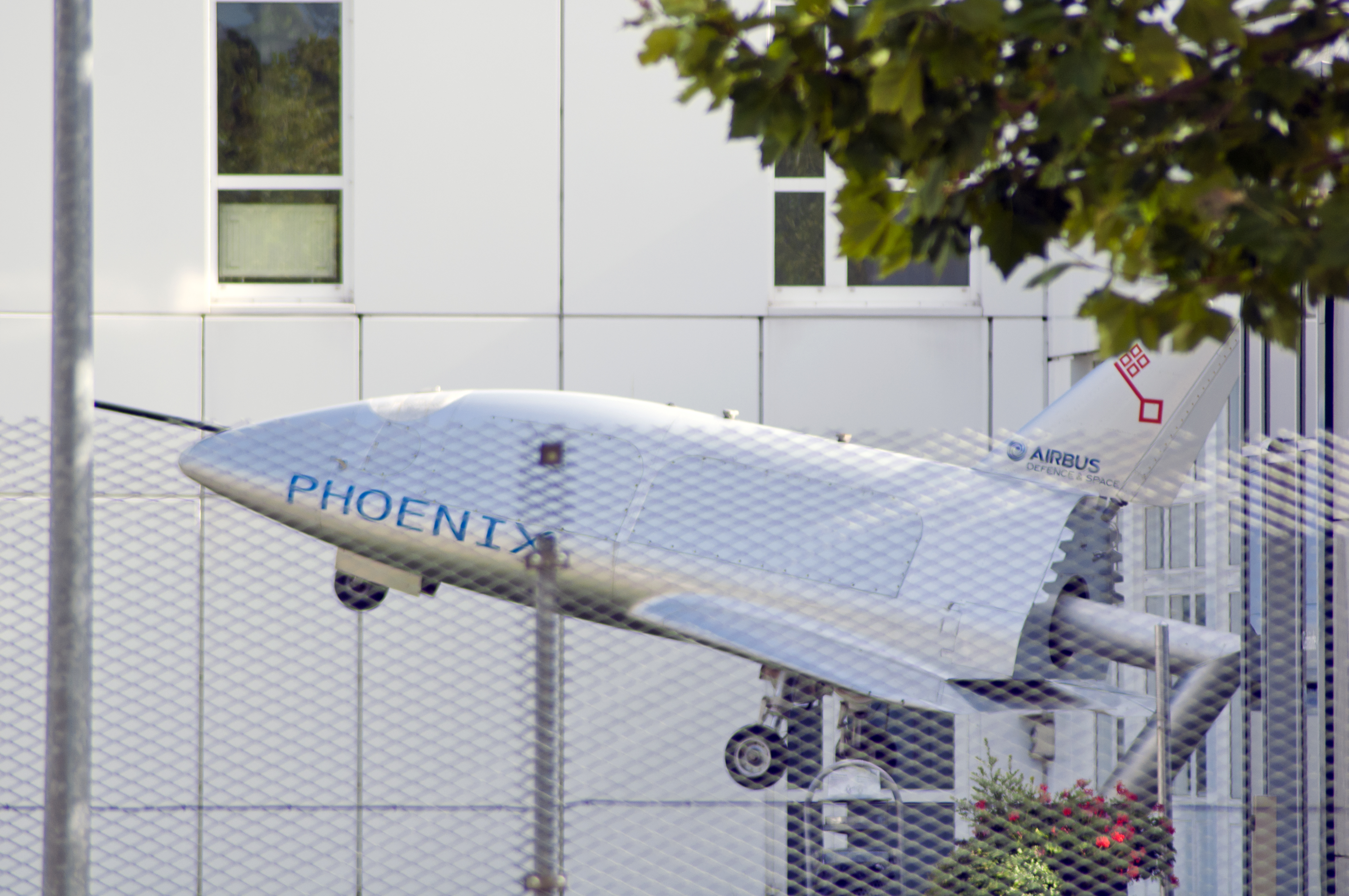
Phoenix prototype glider preserved at Airbus Bremen

== Prototype - Phoenix ==
The Phoenix RLV launcher, the prototype of the Hopper launcher, was announced by DASA in June 1999 to be developed and produced as a portion of the wider ASTRA program of the German Aerospace Center (DLR), a €40 million project founded by the German Federal Government, EADS' Astrium subsidiary and the state of Bremen. Reportedly, EADS and the state of Bremen invested at least €8.2 million and €4.3 million respectively in the ASTRA programme. A further contribution of €16 million was sourced from partner companies on the program, such as the Bremen-based OHB-System, the DLR and the Federal Ministry for Education and Research. Construction of the prototype began in 2000.

The Phoenix RLV was 6.9 meters (23 feet) long, had a weight of 1,200 kilograms (2,600 pounds), and a wingspan of 3.9 meters (13 feet). During its design, an emphasis had been placed on minimizing drag by making the vehicle as small as possible. The fuselage interior was occupied by various avionics and onboard systems, providing navigation, data transfer, energy supply, and artificial intelligence functions to allow it to automatically perform its data-gathering mission. Phoenix was one-sixth the size of the planned Hopper vehicle. The final version of the vehicle was expected to be able to support the reentry forces and heat, and be able to glide from an altitude of 129 kilometers (80 mi). Integration and system testing works were completed in April 2004.

=== Drop tests - May 2004 ===
On Saturday, May 8, 2004, the Phoenix prototype underwent a large-scale drop-test at the North European Aerospace Test range in Vidsel, Sweden. The vehicle was lifted by helicopter and dropped from a height of 2.4 kilometres (7,900 ft). Following a 90-second guided glide, the prototype reportedly landed with precision and without incident. The primary aim of the test was to assess the glider potential of the craft. More specifically, the Phoenix explored various methods of performing automatic landings that would not involve any human intervention; guidance was provided by multiple means of navigation, including GPS satellites, radar and laser altimeters, and various pressure and speed sensors. According to EADS spokesman Mathias Spude, the prototype had landed within three centimeters of the intended target.

Additional tests had already been scheduled, including three that were planned to occur during the following two weeks, which were to build towards the testing of more challenging landings (involving the spacecraft being dropped from different angles or orientations relative to the landing site). Furthermore, the project had an anticipated milestone of releasing the prototype from an altitude of 25 kilometres (82,000 ft) within three years. However, EADS noted prior to the flight that further tests would be dependent on the craft's performance during the initial flight.

Two further test flights were conducted on May 13 (a repeat of the May 8 drop test) and May 16.

== Longer term - Socrates ==
In the long term, if successful and viable, the landing technology tested on Phoenix was to be incorporated into a follow-on re-usable vehicle, which was to be named Socrates. While not envisioned to serve as an orbital vehicle, Socrates was to be capable of flying at up to 10 times the speed of sound, as well as of performing very rapid turnaround times between flights as a steppingstone towards re-usability.

== See also ==
- Hermes – French crewed spaceplane concept (1975–1992)
- Intermediate eXperimental Vehicle – ESA re-entry vehicle prototype
- Maglev – Train system using magnetic levitation
- Rocket sled launch – Proposed method for launching space vehicles
- Liquid Fly-back Booster – Launch vehicle study
- German space programme
