= Atmospheric Reentry Demonstrator =

ESA suborbital reentry vehicle

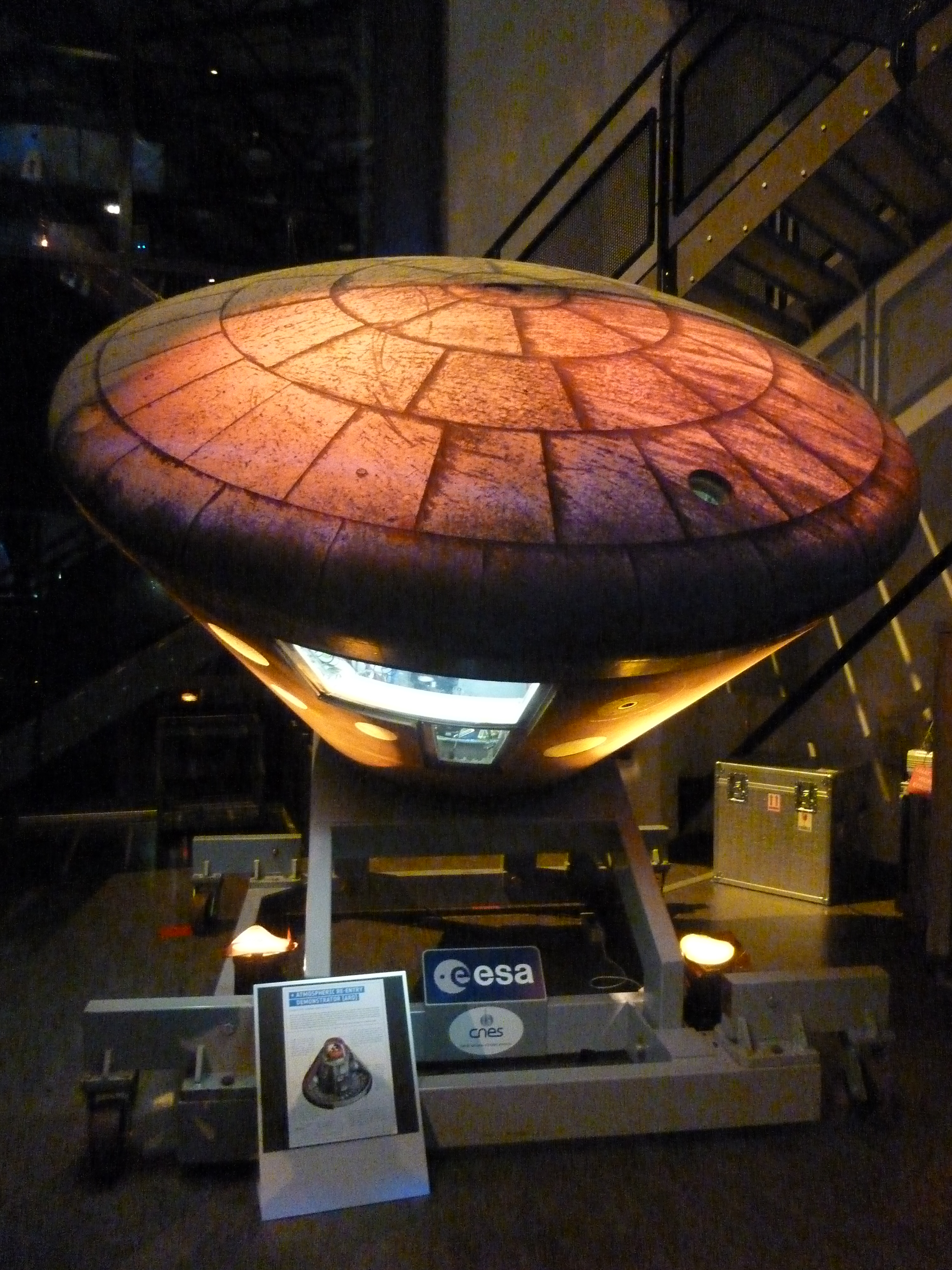
The Atmospheric Reentry Demonstrator at ESTEC

The Advanced Reentry Demonstrator (ARD) was a European Space Agency (ESA) suborbital reentry vehicle. It was developed and operated for experimental purposes, specifically to validate the multiple reentry technologies integrated upon it and the vehicle's overall design, as well as to gain greater insight into the various phenomenon encountered during reentry.

The ARD only performed a single spaceflight. On 21 October 1998, the vehicle was launched upon the third flight of the Ariane 5 expendable launch system. Reaching a recorded altitude of 830 km, the ARD performed a guided reentry back to Earth before splashing down relatively close to its intended target point in the Pacific Ocean after one hour and 41 minutes of flight. Following its recovery and subsequent analysis, the vehicle was found to have performed well, the nose cone and heat shield thermal protection having remaining in an ideal state and having remained completely airtight and perfectly intact.

The ARD was the first guided sub-orbital reentry vehicle to be manufactured, launched and recovered by Europe. One of the core purposes of the mission was the gathering of knowledge that could be subsequently used during the development of future re-entry vehicles and precise landing capabilities. In the aftermath of the programme, the ESA decided to embark on a follow-up reentry demonstrator, known as the Intermediate eXperimental Vehicle (IXV). The first IXV vehicle underwent its first successful test flight during February 2015. The ARD and IVX demonstrators are intended to serve as developmental stepping stones towards a vehicle called Space Rider, meant to be the first of a series of production-standard spaceplanes.

== Development ==
From the 1980s onwards, there was growing international interest in the development of reusable spacecraft; at this time, only the superpowers of the era, the Soviet Union and the United States, had developed this capability. European nations such as Britain and France embarked on their own national programmes to produce spaceplanes, such as HOTOL and Hermes, while attempting to attract the backing of the multinational European Space Agency (ESA). While these programmes ultimately did not garner enough support to continue development, there was still demand within a number of the ESA's member states to pursue the development of reusable space vehicles. Accordingly, shortly after the abandonment of the Hermes programme, it was decided to conduct a technology demonstrator programme with the aim of producing a vehicle which would support the development of subsequent reusable spacecraft. The ESA later referred to this programme, which became known as the Atmospheric Reentry Demonstrator (ARD), as being: "major step towards developing and operating space transportation vehicles that can return to Earth... For the first time, Europe will fly a complete space mission – launching a vehicle into space and recovering it safely."

The ARD was developed and operated as a cooperative civilian space programme under the oversight of the ESA; it fell within the agency's Manned Space Transportation Program (MSTP) framework. Under this framework, the programme was pursued with a pair of expressed principal objectives. First, the ESA was keen to perform a demonstration of the ability of the European space industry to design and produce low-cost reentry vehicles, as well as its ability to handle the critical mission phases involved in their operation, such as sub-orbital flight, reentry and vehicle recovery. In addition, the ARD was equipped with a comprehensive suite of sensors and recording equipment so that detailed measurements were obtained during testing; it was recognised that exploration of various phenomena across the successive phases of flight would be of high value. The data gained would be subsequently catalogued and harnessed during further programmes, especially future reentry vehicles and reusable launch systems.

The prime contractor selected to perform the ARD's development and construction was French aerospace company Aérospatiale (which later merged into the multinational EADS – SPACE Transportation group). During 1995 and 1996, multiple development studies exploring concepts for the shape of such a vehicle were conducted; ultimately, it was decided to adopt a configuration that resembled the classical manned Apollo capsule which had been previously operated by NASA. The use of an existing shape was a deliberate measure to avoid a length exploration of the craft's aerodynamic properties; both the dimensions and mass of the craft were also defined by the capabilities of the Ariane 5 expendable launch system used to deploy the vehicle.

It has been claimed that even early on, the programme schedule was relatively tight and funding was limited. According to the ESA, the restrictive financing of the programme was an intentional effort, to prove that such a vehicle could be demonstrated with a smaller budget than previous efforts had been.

The experience and data obtained through ARD and IVX demonstrators are serving as developmental stepping stones towards a vehicle called Space Rider.

== Design ==
The ARD is an unmanned 3-axis stabilised automated capsule which served as experimental reentry vehicle primarily for technology-proving and data-gathering purposes. In terms of its shape, the vehicle bears an external resemblance to a 70 per cent-scale version of the American Apollo capsule, and considered by the ESA to be a 50 per cent-scale vehicle of a prospective potentially operational transportation vehicle; as such, it is 2.8 meters in diameter and weighs 2.8 tons at atmospheric interface point. The ARD possesses an air- and water-tight pressurised structure primarily composed of an aluminium alloy, which is protected by a layer of Norcoat 62250 FI cork composite tiles across the exterior of nosecone and by an arrangement of aleastrasil silicon dioxide-phenol formaldehyde resin tiles over the heat shield. The vehicle itself can be divided into three distinct sections: the frontshield section, the rear-cone section and the backcover section.

The ARD possesses manoeuvrability capabilities during re-entry; a favourable lift-to-drag ratio is achieved via an off-set center of gravity. The guidance law is akin to that of Apollo and the Space Shuttle, being based on a drag-velocity profile control and bank angles manoeuvres in order to conform with heating, load factor, rebound, and other required conditions; according to the ESA, this provided acceptable final guidance accuracy (within 5 km) with limited real-time calculation complexity. In operation, the guidance system becomes active once the aerodynamic forces become efficient and as long as the reaction control system remains efficient. Instead of using flight control surfaces, non-linear control is instead ensured by an assortment of seven hydrazine thrusters which, according to the manufacturer, were derived from the Ariane 5 expendable launch system. These rocket thrusters, each typically generating 400-N of thrust, were arranged in a blow-down configuration and positioned so that three units provide pitch control, two for roll and two for yaw.

During its reentry into the atmosphere, the ARD's heat shield is exposed to temperatures reaching as high as 2000 °C and a heat flux peaking at 1000 kW/m2, resulting from the ionisation of the atmosphere, which is in turn caused by the vehicle travelling at hypersonic speeds, in excess of 27,000 km/h during parts of its reentry descent. While the conical area of the vehicle may reach 1000 °C, with a heat flux of 90–125 kW/m2, the interior temperature will not rise above 40 °C. The thermal protection measures used were a combination of pre-existing materials that Aerospatiale had already developed under French military programmes along with multiple new-generation materials, the latter of which had been principally included for testing purposes. During reentry, the ARD's head shield loses only 0.5 mm of its thickness, keeping its aerodynamic shape relatively constant, which in turn simplifies the flight control algorithms.

The vehicle is equipped with a Descent Recovery System (DRS), deployed prior to splashdown in order to limit the impact loads and to ensure its flotation for up to 36 hours. This system involving the deployment of multiple parachutes, stored within the internal space of the tip of the nose cone; in total, one flat ribbon pilot chute, one conical ribbon drogue chute with a single reefing stage, and three slotted ribbon main parachutes with two reefing stages are typically deployed. For buoyancy purposes, a pair of inflatable balloons are also present in the DRS, helping to keep the vehicle upright. To aid in its recovery, the ARD is furnished with both a satellite-based search and rescue radio beacon and flashing light.

The internal space of the ARD and was packed with the most advanced technologies to test and qualify new technologies and flight control capabilities for atmospheric reentry and landing. The avionics of the vehicle were primarily sourced from existing equipment used upon the Ariane 5 launcher. The guidance and navigation systems used a computerised inertial navigation system which, via a databus, would be automatically corrected by GPS during the ballistic phase of flight. However, the ARD was designed to be tolerant to instances of GPS failure; this is achieved via a series of control loop algorithms that verify the GPS-derived data to be within a pre-established ‘credibility window’, defined by the inertial navigation readings. During the vehicle's sole mission, it continuously recorded and transmitted to the ground in excess of 200 critical parameters that were used to analyse the ARD's flight performance as well as the behaviour of the equipment on board.

== Operational history ==
The ARD only performed a single spaceflight. On 21 October 1998, the ARD was launched upon the third flight of the Ariane 5 expendable launch system. It was released shortly after separation of the launcher's cryogenic main stage (at an altitude of about 216 km) 12 minutes after lift-off from the Guiana Space Centre, Europe's spaceport in Kourou, French Guiana. The ARD attained a recorded altitude of 830 km, after which a guided reentry into the atmosphere was conducted. It splashed down to within 4.9 km of its target point in the Pacific Ocean between the Marquesas Islands and Hawaii after one hour and 41 minutes of flight.

The ARD was recovered roughly five hours following splash down. Following recovery, the vehicle was transported back to Europe and subject to detailed technical analysis in order to acquire more information on its performance. Engineers analysing data from its sub-orbital flight reported that all the capsule's systems had performed well and according to expectations; analysis of the craft's real-time telemetry broadcast during the flight had also reported that all electrical equipment and propulsion systems functioned nominally. The onboard telemetry systems and reception stations had all performed well, and the onboard GPS receiver worked satisfactorily during the entire flight except, as expected, during black-out in reentry.

Following post-mission analysis of the ARD's performance, it was announced that all of the demonstration and system requirements of the programme had been successfully achieved. The test flight itself was described as having been "nearly nominal", particularly the trajectory and flight control aspects; additionally, many of the onboard systems, such as the navigation (primary and backup), propulsion, thermal protection, communication, and DRS were found to have performed either as predicted or to have been outside these predictions by only a small margin. During reentry, the heat shield temperature reached a recorded peak temperature of 900 °C; nevertheless, both the vehicle's cone and heat shield thermal protection were found in a perfect state following its retrieval.

Issues highlighted during analysis included the role of design uncertainties having led to difficulties in observing some physical phenomena such as real gas effects, addressing aerothermal environment characterization was also hindered due to the premature failure of some thermocouples. Overall, the flight was stated to have brought a great amount of high quality aerodynamic information back which, amongst other benefits, served to confirm and enhance the capabilities of ground-based prediction tools. Since its retrieval and the conclusion of post-mission examination, the sole ARD vehicle itself has been preserved and has become a publicly-accessible exhibit at the European Space Research and Technology Centre in Noordwijk, Netherlands.

== See also ==
- IXV, follow-up ESA reentry demonstrator, tested in February 2015.
- OREX, equivalent Japanese demonstrator from 1994, developed and flown by NASDA
- CARE, experimental test vehicle for the ISRO Orbital Vehicle launched on 18 December 2014 atop GSLV Mk III LVM 3X
