= Italian Aerospace Research Centre =

Coordinates: 41°07′16″N 14°10′50″E

The Italian Aerospace Research Centre (Italian: Centro Italiano Ricerche Aerospaziali, CIRA) is a consortium established in July 1984 by Luigi G. Napolitano to promote the growth and success of the aerospace industry in Italy (its head-office is in Capua). The majority of CIRA share capital is held by government organizations: the Italian Space Agency (ASI) and the National Research Council of Italy (Consiglio Nazionale delle Ricerche - CNR).

== Spaceplane technology ==
CIRA is developing spaceplane technology using its facilities for numerical simulation and ground tests, and has flown its first transonic flight test of a "flying test-bed" (FTB) vehicle dropped from a high-altitude balloon. CIRA intends to develop FTB vehicles by 2012 that can perform atmospheric reentry from low Earth orbit, launched using the Vega space launch system. This is consistent with the Intermediate eXperimental Vehicle (IXV) plan of the European Space Agency.

Since 2005, CIRA is a partner of the Euro-Mediterranean Center for Climate Change (CMCC).
