= European eXPErimental Re-entry Testbed =

Planned European Space Agency experiment

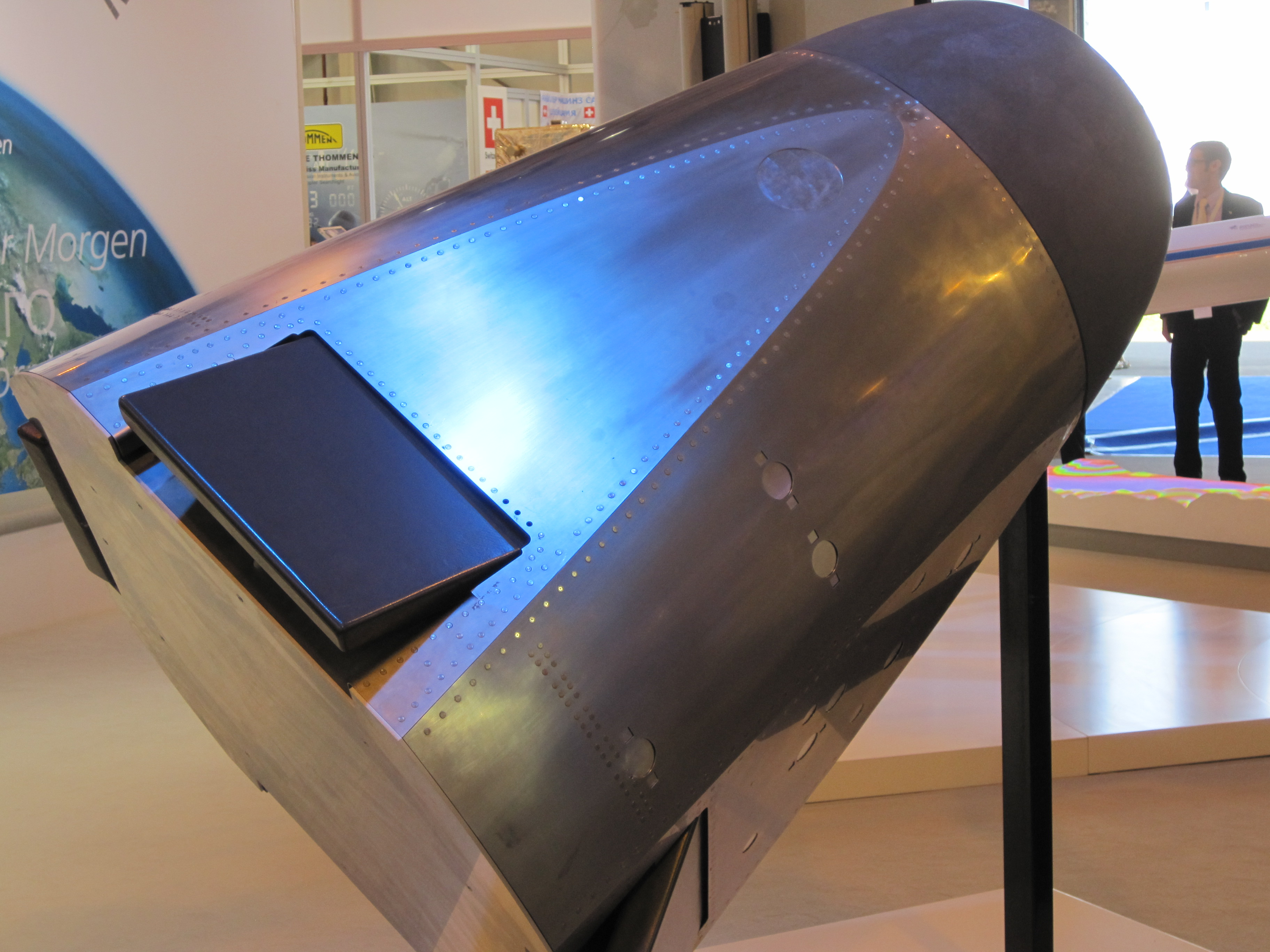
EXPERT

European eXPErimental Re-entry Test-bed (EXPERT) was a European Space Agency aerothermodynamics research programme. It was planned that vehicle will be launched on a Russian Volna launch vehicle and will provide knowledge and experience in the design and development of re-entry vehicles. As of 2012, one element in a European Space Agency push to develop vehicles capable of re-entry has been pushed back until at least 2013 as the agency seeks a launch alternative to the Russian submarine-launched Volna rocket which was withdrawn. One of its main goals was to test materials for ESA's Intermediate eXperimental Vehicle (IXV), an unmanned, delta-winged plane launched in 2015 aboard ESA's new Vega small-satellite launcher. Currently EXPERT remains in storage conditions in Turin.

== EXPERT Mission objectives ==
According to an ESA-ESTEC paper, the EXPERT program has the following goals:

- Enable in-flight data gathering of selected aerothermodynamic phenomena with high accuracy and reliability
- Allow the validation of numerical modeling tools (CFD) and of methodologies for ground-to-flight data extrapolation
- Qualify in-flight classical and advanced measurement techniques
- Conduct extensive post-flight analyses based on in-flight data, pre-flight numerical databases, preflight ground testing activities.
