= German space programme =

German government program

The German space programme is the set of projects funded by the government of Germany for the exploration and use of outer space. The space programme is run by the German Aerospace Center, who conduct research, plan, and implement the programme on behalf of the German federal government.

== History ==
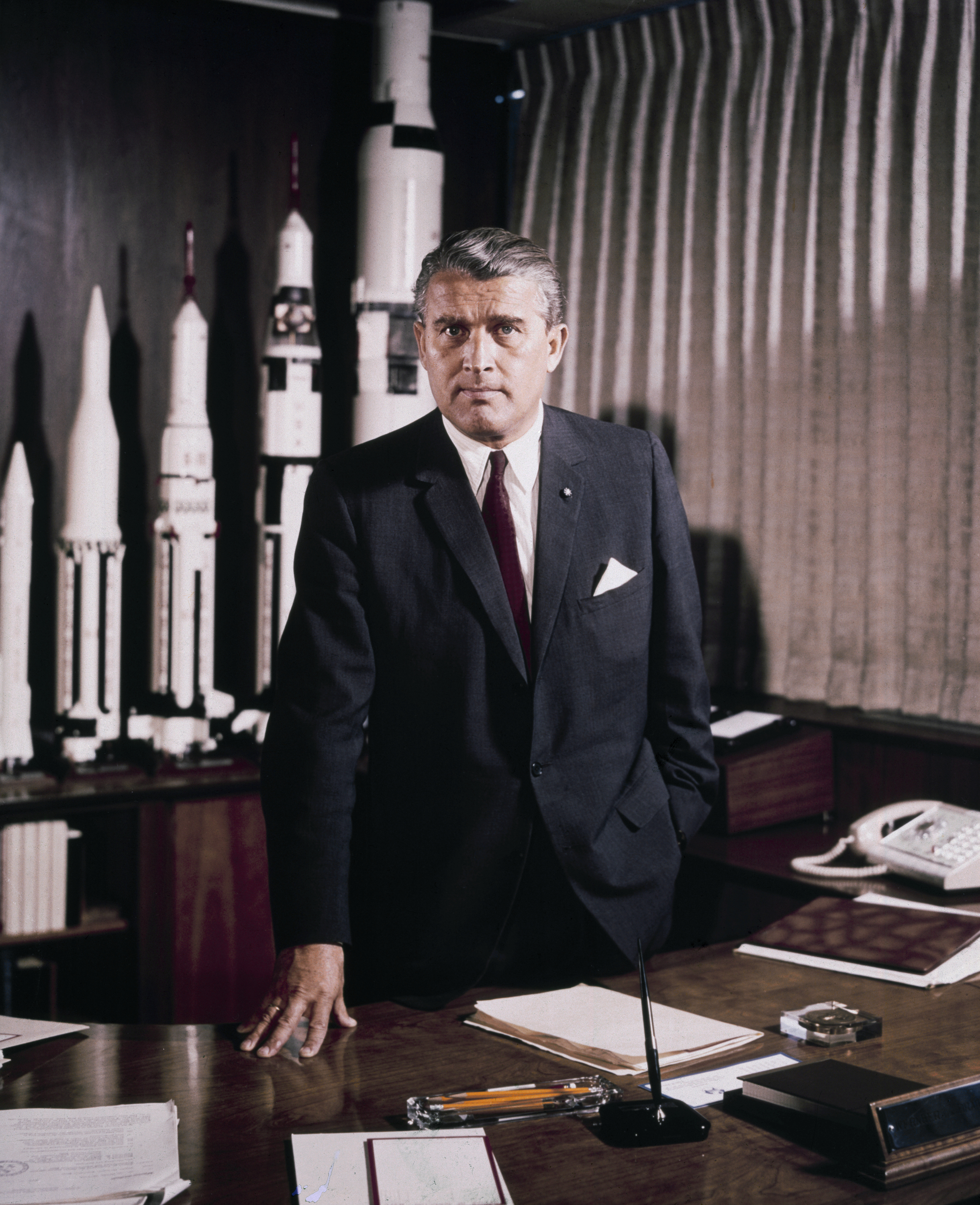
Wernher von Braun (1912–1977) was the technical director of Nazi Germany's missile programme before his migration to the United States.

While the idea of spaceflight had been explored by novels before, Hermann Oberth’s book Die Rakete zu den Planetenräumen was influential in propagating the idea of space flight. The book eventually inspired the establishment of the Verein für Raumschiffahrt (Society for Space Travel) in 1927, where amateur rocket scientists collaborated to advance the field of liquid-fueled rocketry. Between the 1930s and 1940s, Nazi Germany researched and built operational ballistic missiles capable of suborbital spaceflight.

== Organisations ==
Locations of space organisations of Germany

=== German Aerospace Center ===
The German Aerospace Center (German: Deutsches Zentrum für Luft- und Raumfahrt e.V.; DLR) is Germany's research and technology organisation for aeronautics and space. It conducts research for these fields, as well as in energy, transport, security and defence. The German Space Agency at the DLR is Germany's space agency. DLR also serves as a project management agency (Projektträger) both nationally and internationally.

DLR is headquartered in Cologne. It operates at 30 locations across Germany with 51 institutes, facilities and competence centres. DLR employs a total of 11,786 people (as of 2024).

DLR is actively engaged in European and international research networks and maintains offices in Brussels, Paris, Washington D.C. and Tokyo. It also collaborates with several international research infrastructures, including Andøya, Norway (launch site for sounding rockets), Almería, Spain (research, development and test centre for concentrating solar technologies), Évora, Portugal (solar field with parabolic trough test facility for molten salt), Gars O'Higgins, Antarctica (satellite data receiving station), Inuvik, Canada (satellite data reception station), and Kiruna, Sweden (launch site for sounding rockets).

==== Institute of Space Propulsion ====
The Institute of Space Propulsion in Lampoldshausen is one of the eight research centers of the German Aerospace Center (DLR).

Approximately 220 people work there in the fields of research and tests of rocket engines. The main purpose of the facility is the operation of test stands for space propulsion on behalf of the European Space Agency (ESA) and in cooperation with the European space industry.

== Mission control centres ==
=== Columbus Control Centre ===
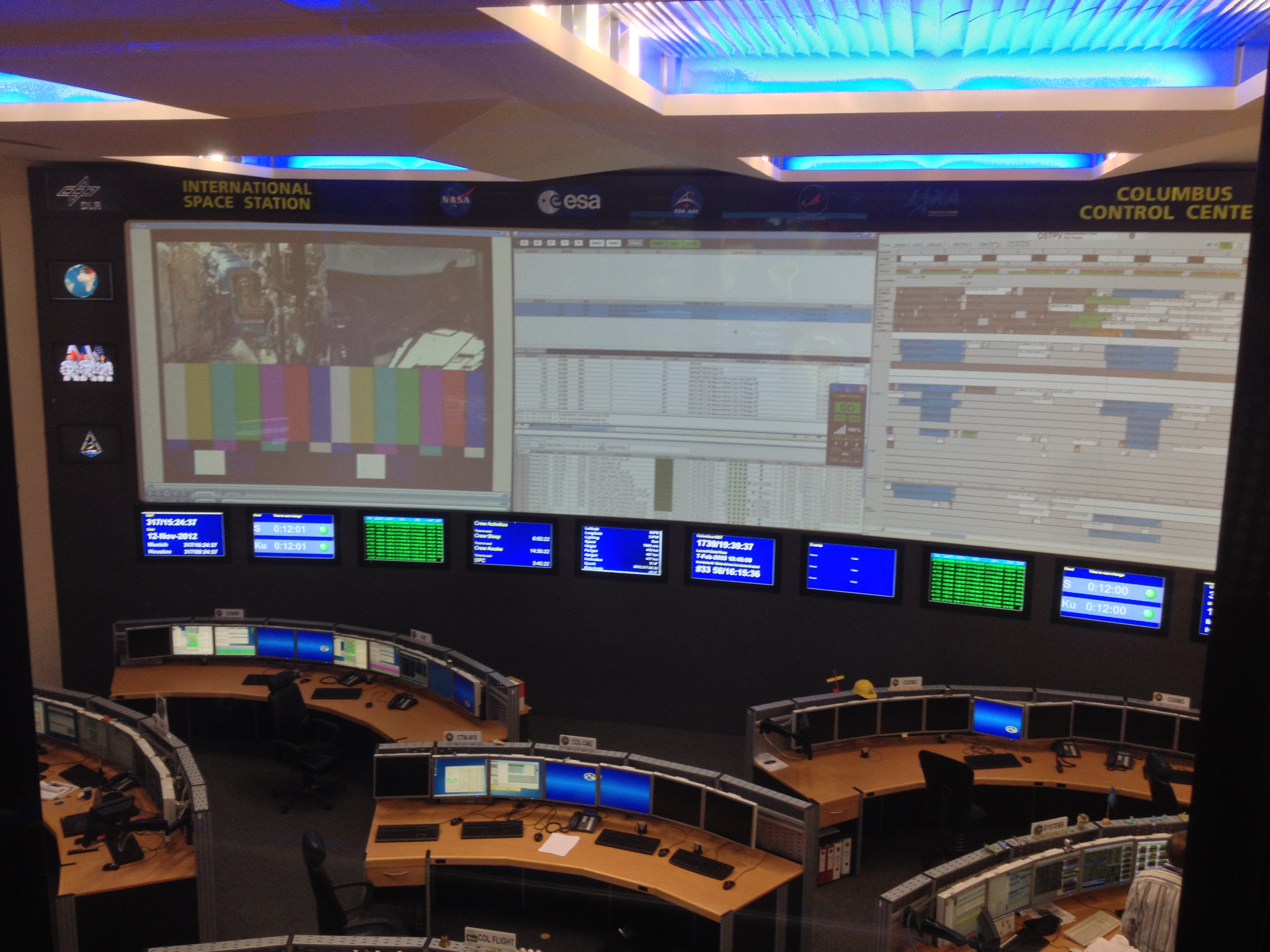
Interior of the Columbus Control Centre

The Columbus Control Centre also known by its radio callsign, Mission Control Munich, is the mission control centre which is used to control the Columbus research laboratory, which is part of the International Space Station (ISS). The control centre is located at the German Aerospace Center (DLR) facility in Oberpfaffenhofen near Munich, Germany. The centre is operated by the DLR, under contract from the European Space Agency (ESA).

The Columbus Control Centre entered full-time operation during the STS-122 Shuttle Mission, which delivered the Columbus module to the ISS. The module was attached to the ISS on 11 February 2008.

=== European Space Operations Centre ===
The European Space Operations Centre (ESOC) serves as the main mission control centre for the European Space Agency (ESA) and is located in Darmstadt, Germany. ESOC's primary function is the operation of uncrewed spacecraft on behalf of ESA and the launch and early orbit phases (LEOP) of ESA and third-party missions. The centre is also responsible for a range of operations-related activities within ESA and in cooperation with ESA's industry and international partners, including ground systems engineering, software development, flight dynamics and navigation, development of mission control tools and techniques and space debris studies.

ESOC's current major activities comprise operating planetary and solar missions, such as Mars Express and the Trace Gas Orbiter, astronomy & fundamental physics missions, such as Gaia and XMM Newton, and Earth observation missions such as CryoSat2 and Swarm.

ESOC is responsible for developing, operating and maintaining ESA's ESTRACK network of ground stations. Teams at the centre are also involved in research and development related to advanced mission control concepts and Space Situational Awareness, and standardisation activities related to frequency management; mission operations; tracking, telemetry and telecommanding; and space debris.

=== German Space Operations Center ===
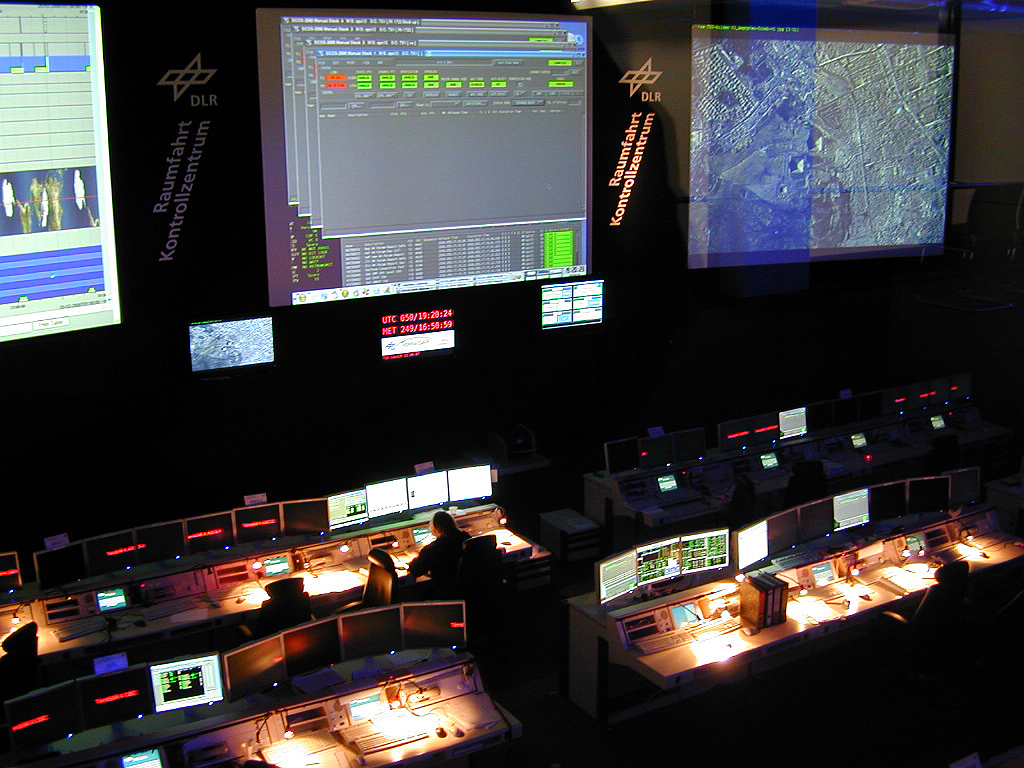
View of the German Space Operations Center

The German Space Operations Center (GSOC; German: Deutsches Raumfahrt-Kontrollzentrum) is the mission control center of German Aerospace Center (DLR) in Oberpfaffenhofen near Munich, Germany.

After the Federal Republic of Germany decided in the 1960s to launch a national space program and to participate in international space projects, the idea of having its own space control center became concrete. In 1967, then Federal Minister of Finance Franz Josef Strauss laid the foundation stone for the first building complex, which was opened a little later.

Until 1985, the Oberpfaffenhofen site of the then German Aerospace Research and Testing Institute (DFVLR) increasingly concentrated on spaceflight. The human spaceflight received special attention. The GSOC then accompanied two crewed missions: During STS-61-A in 1985, GSOC took over the control of the Spacelab, while flight control continued from NASA's Lyndon B. Johnson Space Center was acquired. For the first time, the Payload Operation Control Center (POCC) of a US space mission was directed outside of NASA. For the first time, a human spaceflight was partially monitored from outside the USA or the Soviet Union. During this mission, then Bavarian Prime Minister Franz Josef Strauss announced on 5 November 1985 an extensive investment program with which the role of Oberpfaffenhofen in European spaceflight should be increased.

The failure of Ariane 3 in 1985 and the Challenger disaster in 1986 slowed the development of the Oberpfaffenhofen and the GSOC. The investment program gave the GSOC a new building, Building 140. Construction began in April 1989.

In 1993, GSOC accompanied the entire operation with STS-55 and had full payload control via the Spacelab. This was the first time that there was unfiltered access to all data.

== Astronauts ==
As of 2024, twelve Germans have been in space. The first German, and only East German, in space was Sigmund Jähn in 1978. Three astronauts – Ulf Merbold, Reinhard Furrer and Ernst Messerschmid – represented West Germany during the time of divided Germany. Merbold made two other spaceflights after Germany was reunified in 1990. He is the only German to have been in space three times.

Thomas Reiter, Alexander Gerst, and Mathias Maurer have made long-term spaceflights. The other five astronauts are Klaus-Dietrich Flade, Hans Schlegel, Ulrich Walter, Reinhold Ewald, and Gerhard Thiele.

== Rockets ==
=== V-2 ===
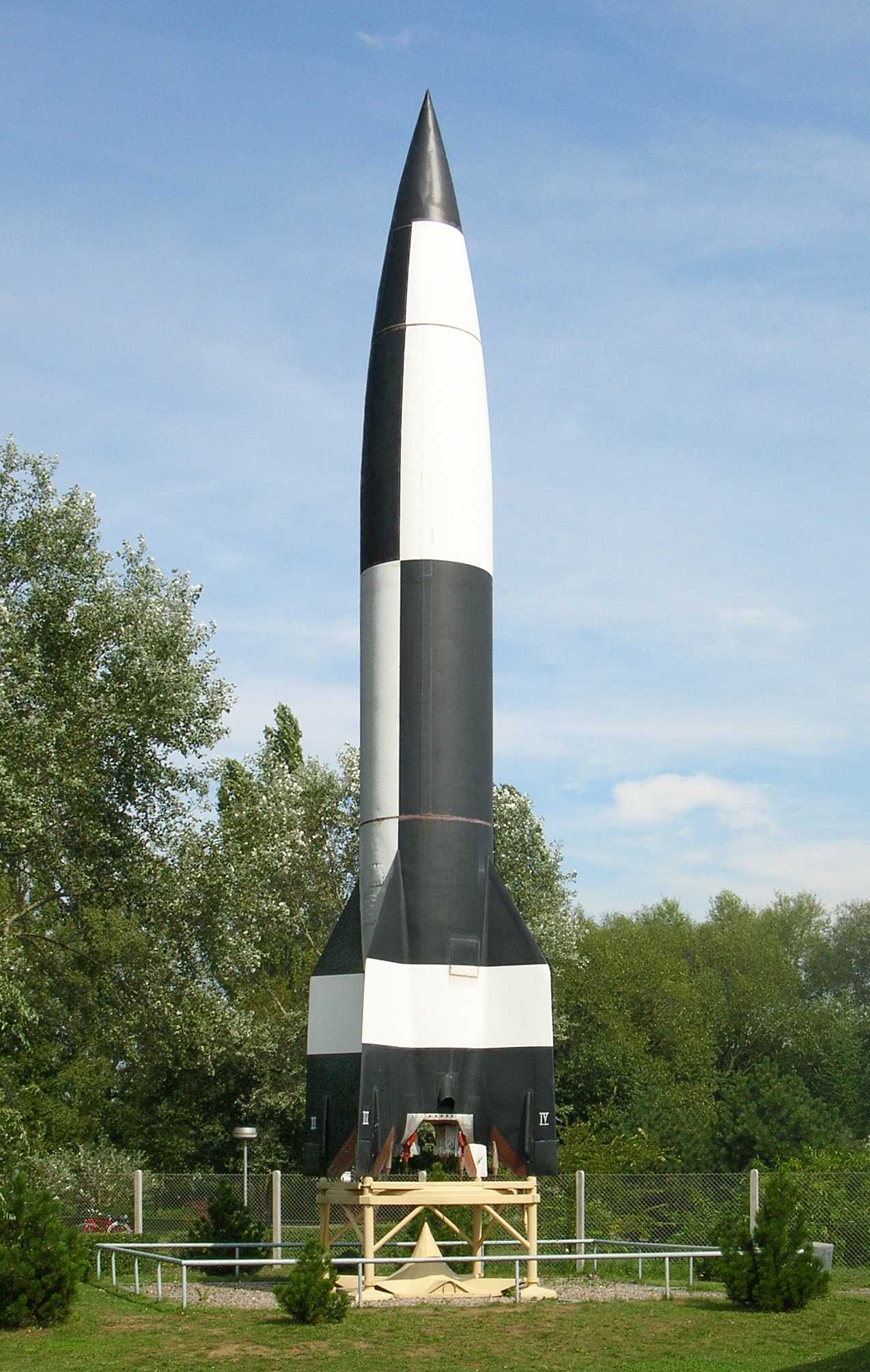
Peenemünde Museum replica of V2

The V-2 rocket (German: Vergeltungswaffe 2, lit. 'Vengeance Weapon 2'), with the development name Aggregat-4 (A4), was the world's first practical, modern ballistic missile. The missile, powered by a liquid-propellant rocket engine, was developed during the Second World War in Nazi Germany as a "vengeance weapon" and assigned to attack Allied cities as retaliation for the Allied bombings of German cities. After an altitude of 100km was selected to define the edge of space, the V2 rocket also became retroactively the first artificial object to travel into space with the vertical launch of MW 18014 on 20 June 1944.

Research of military use of long-range rockets began when the graduate studies of Wernher von Braun were noticed by the German Army. A series of prototypes culminated in the A4, which went to war as the V2. Beginning in September 1944, more than 3,000 V2s were launched by the Wehrmacht against Allied targets, first London and later Antwerp and Liège. According to a 2011 BBC documentary, the attacks from V-2s resulted in the deaths of an estimated 9,000 civilians and military personnel, while a further 12,000 laborers and concentration camp prisoners died as a result of their forced participation in the production of the weapons.

The rockets traveled at supersonic speeds, impacted without audible warning, and proved unstoppable. No countermeasures existed except for misdirection and attacks on launch sites and manufacturing facilities. However, postwar and historical assessments found they had little material or strategic impact on the war, despite the great cost of the program.

Teams from the Allied forces—the United States, the United Kingdom, France and the Soviet Union—raced to procure the Germans' missile technology. Through Operation Paperclip, captured hardware and manufacturing facilities, the V-2 was very influential on later ballistic missile and spaceflight development.

=== TEXUS ===
TEXUS is a European/German sounding rocket programme, serving the microgravity programmes of ESA and DLR. The launches are conducted from Esrange in Sweden.

The first mission was conducted on 13 December 1977, using a British Skylark rocket. All missions up to TEXUS-41 in 2004 were conducted using Skylark rockets. Following the Skylark's retirement in 2005, TEXUS launches switched to the Brazilian VSB-30 rocket.

=== Liquid fly-back booster ===
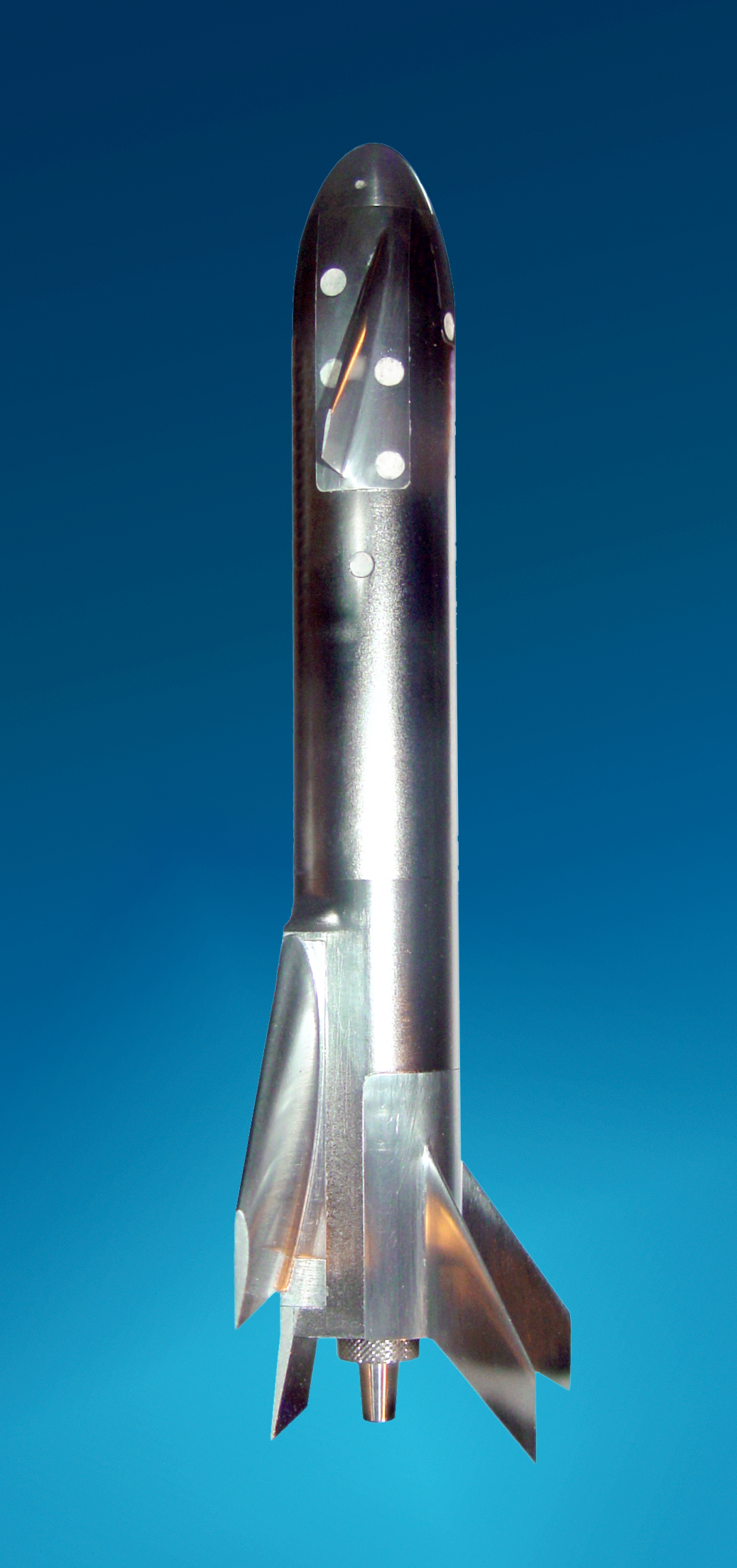
The LFBB model used in wind tunnel tests by the German Aerospace Center (DLR)

Liquid Fly-back Booster (LFBB) was a German Aerospace Center's (DLR's) project concept to develop a liquid rocket booster capable of reuse for Ariane 5 in order to significantly reduce the high cost of space transportation and increase environmental friendliness. LFBB would replace the existing solid rocket boosters, which provided the majority of thrust from liftoff to separation. Once separated, the two winged boosters would perform an atmospheric entry, go back autonomously to the French Guiana, and land horizontally on the airport like an aeroplane.

Additionally a family of derivative launch vehicles was proposed in order to take an advantage of economies of scale, further reducing launch costs. These derivatives include:

German Aerospace Center studied Liquid Fly-back Boosters as a part of future launcher research programme from 1999 to 2004. After the cancellation of the project, publications at DLR continued until 2009.

=== SpaceLiner ===
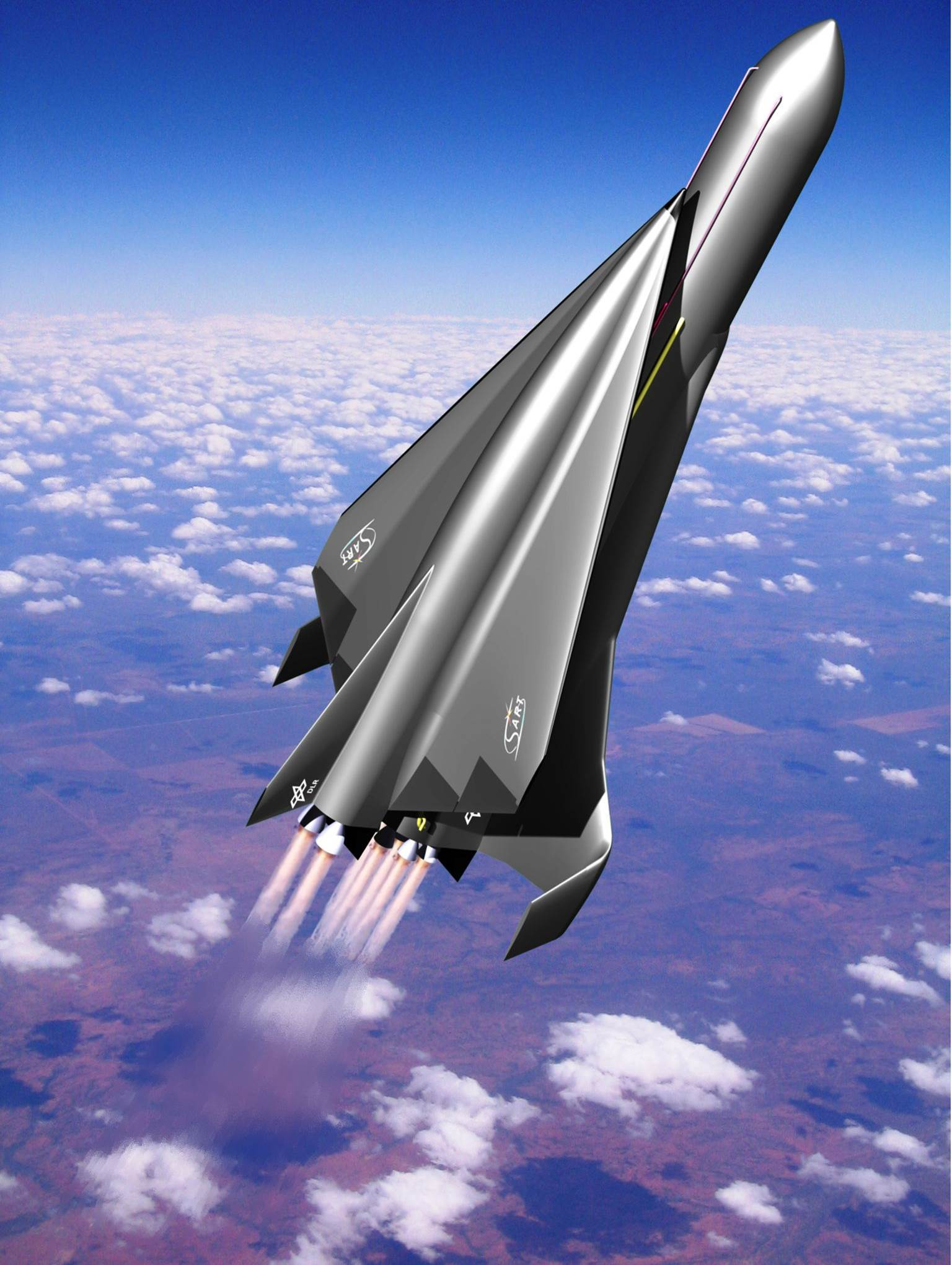
Artist's impression of the SpaceLiner 7 during ascent

SpaceLiner is a concept for a suborbital, hypersonic, winged passenger supersonic transport, conceived at the German Aerospace Center (Deutsches Zentrum für Luft- und Raumfahrt, or DLR) in 2005. In its second role the SpaceLiner is intended as a reusable launch vehicle (RLV) capable of delivering heavy payloads into orbit.

The SpaceLiner is a very long-term project, and does not currently have funding lined up to initiate system development as of 2017. Projections in 2015 were that if adequate funding was eventually secured, the SpaceLiner concept might become an operational spaceplane in the 2040s.

=== RETALT ===
RETALT (RETro Propulsion Assisted Landing Technologies) is a project for aiming to investigate in key technologies for retropropulsion reusable launch systems established in March 2019 with funds from the European Union's Horizon 2020 program. It aims to "advance the research and development of key technologies for European vertical-landing launch vehicles."

The reference configurations for the development of the targeted technologies are two types of vertical launch and landing rockets a two-stage-to-orbit and a single-stage to orbit . The partner organisations are DLR, CFS Engineering (Switzerland), Elecnor Deimos (Spain), MT Aerospace (Germany), Almatech (Switzerland) and Amorim Cork Composites (Portugal).

== Missions operated by Germany ==
=== MW 18014 ===
MW 18014 was a German A-4 test rocket (Note: V-2 rockets were still known as A-4s until September 1944) launched on 20 June 1944, at the Peenemünde Army Research Center in Peenemünde. It was the first man-made object to reach outer space, attaining an apogee of 176 kilometres (109 mi), well above the Kármán line that was established later as the lowest altitude of space. As a vertical test launch that was not intended to reach orbital velocity, it returned and impacted Earth, making it the first sub-orbital spaceflight.

=== Helios ===
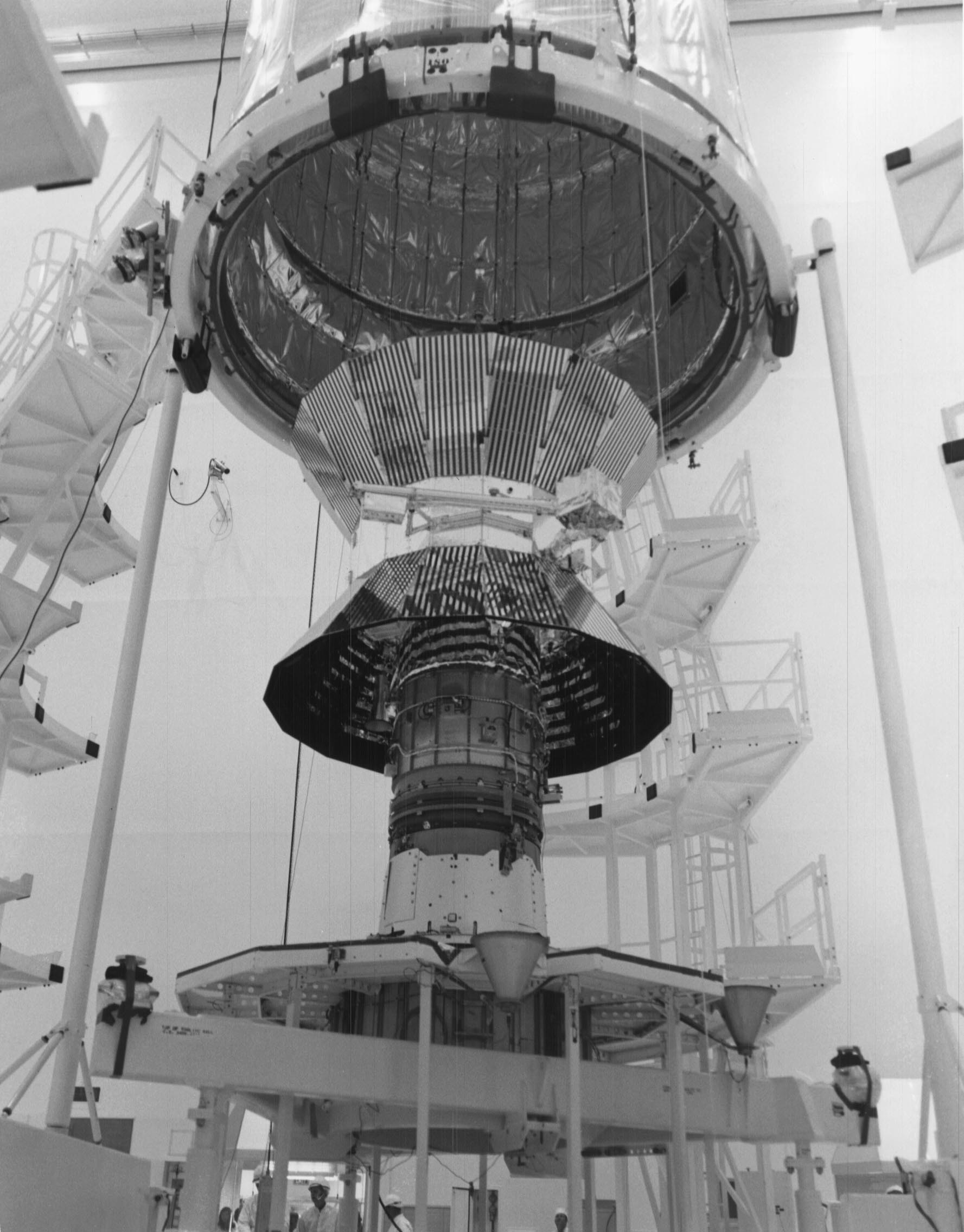
Prototype of the Helios spacecraft

Helios-A and Helios-B (after launch renamed Helios 1 and Helios 2) are a pair of probes that were launched into heliocentric orbit to study solar processes. As a joint venture between German Aerospace Center (DLR) and NASA, the probes were launched from Cape Canaveral Air Force Station, Florida, on December 10, 1974, and January 15, 1976, respectively.

The Helios project set a maximum speed record for spacecraft of 252,792 km/h (157,078 mph; 70,220 m/s). Helios-B performed the closest flyby of the Sun so far, a record only broken in October 2018 by the Parker Solar Probe. The probes are no longer functional, but as of 2024 remain in elliptical orbits around the Sun.

=== STS-61-A ===
STS-61-A (also known as Spacelab D-1) was the 22nd mission of NASA's Space Shuttle program. It was a scientific Spacelab mission, funded and directed by West Germany – hence the non-NASA designation of D-1 (for Deutschland-1). STS-61-A was the ninth and last successful flight of Space Shuttle Challenger before the STS-51-L disaster. STS-61-A holds the current record for the largest crew—eight people—aboard any single spacecraft for the entire period from launch to landing.

The mission carried the NASA/European Space Agency (ESA) Spacelab module into orbit with 76 scientific experiments on board, and was declared a success. Payload operations were controlled from the German Space Operations Center in Oberpfaffenhofen, West Germany, instead of from the regular NASA control center. This was the first spaceflight to include multiple crewmembers from any single country other than the United States or Soviet Union. The crew also included the first Dutch citizen astronaut, payload specialist Wubbo Ockels.

=== STS-55 ===
STS-55, or Deutschland 2 (D-2), was the 55th overall flight of the NASA Space Shuttle and the 14th flight of Shuttle Columbia. This flight was a multinational Spacelab flight involving 88 experiments from eleven different nations. The experiments ranged from biology sciences to simple Earth observations.

The D-2 mission, as it was commonly called, augmented the German microgravity research program started by the D-1 mission. The German Aerospace Center (DLR) had been tasked by the German Space Agency (DARA – Deutsche Agentur für Raumfahrtangelegenheiten) to conduct the second mission. DLR, NASA, the European Space Agency (ESA), and agencies in France and Japan contributed to D-2's scientific program. Eleven nations participated in the experiments. Of the 88 experiments conducted on the D-2 mission, four were sponsored by NASA.

=== SAMPEX ===
The Solar Anomalous and Magnetospheric Particle Explorer (SAMPEX or Explorer 68) was a NASA solar and magnetospheric observatory and was the first spacecraft in the Small Explorer program. It was launched into low Earth orbit on 3 July 1992 from Vandenberg Air Force Base (Western Test Range) aboard a Scout G-1 launch vehicle. SAMPEX was an international collaboration between NASA and the Max Planck Institute for Extraterrestrial Physics of Germany (which provided the Heavy Ion Large Telescope). The Solar Anomalous and Magnetospheric Particle Explorer (SAMPEX) is the first of a series of spacecraft that was launched under the Small Explorer (SMEX) program for low-cost spacecraft.

=== ABRIXAS ===
A Broadband Imaging X-ray All-sky Survey, or ABRIXAS, was a space-based German X-ray telescope. It was launched on 28 April 1999 in a Kosmos-3M launch vehicle from Kapustin Yar, Russia, into Earth orbit. The orbit had a periapsis of 549.0 kilometres (341.1 mi), an apoapsis of 598.0 kilometres (371.6 mi), an inclination of 48.0° and an eccentricity of 0.00352, giving it a period of 96 minutes.

The telescope's battery was accidentally overcharged and destroyed three days after the mission started. When attempts to communicate with the satellite – while its solar panels were illuminated by sunlight – failed, the $20 million project was abandoned. ABRIXAS decayed from orbit on 31 October 2017.

The eROSITA telescope was based on the design of the ABRIXAS observatory. eROSITA was launched on board the Spektr-RG space observatory on 13 July 2019 from Baikonur to be deployed at the second Lagrange point (L2).

=== DLR-Tubsat ===
DLR-Tubsat (a.k.a. TUBSAT) was a German remote sensing microsatellite, developed in a joint venture between Technische Universität Berlin (TUB) and German Aerospace Center (DLR). TU Berlin was responsible for the satellite bus and DLR was responsible for the payload. The satellite was launched into orbit on 26 May 1999, on the fifth mission of the PSLV program PSLV-C2. The launch took place in the Sriharikota Launching Range. The satellite had an expected life of one year.

=== TerraSAR-X ===
TerraSAR-X is an imaging radar Earth observation satellite, a joint venture being carried out under a public-private-partnership between the German Aerospace Center (DLR) and EADS Astrium. The exclusive commercial exploitation rights are held by the geo-information service provider Astrium. TerraSAR-X was launched on 15 June 2007 and has been in operational service since January 2008. With its twin satellite TanDEM-X, launched 21 June 2010, TerraSAR-X acquires the data basis for the WorldDEM, the worldwide and homogeneous DEM available from 2014.

=== Columbus ===
Columbus is a science laboratory module that forms part of the International Space Station (ISS) and represents the European Space Agency's (ESA) largest single contribution to the station. It was constructed in Turin, Italy, by Alcatel Alenia Space (now Thales Alenia Space) with functional equipment and software designed by EADS (now Airbus Defence and Space) in Bremen, Germany. The module was launched aboard Space Shuttle Atlantis on 7 February 2008, during mission STS-122. Columbus is operated by the Columbus Control Centre at the German Space Operations Center, part of the German Aerospace Center (DLR) in Oberpfaffenhofen near Munich. In 2008, ESA estimated the total cost of Columbus—including construction, ten years of operations, scientific experiments, and supporting ground infrastructure—at approximately €1.4 billion (about US$2 billion).

== Proposed missions ==
=== Baden-Württemberg 1 ===
Baden-Württemberg 1 (BW1) was a proposed lunar mission spacecraft. The mission was led by the University of Stuttgart. The basic design was for a cubical spacecraft 1 meter on a side, with a mass of about 200 kg (441 lb). It may use an pulsed plasma thruster utilizing polytetrafluoroethylene (PTFE) as propellant. As of 2013 work on trajectories had been performed.

Baden-Württemberg 1 was part of the Stuttgart Small Satellite Program initiated in 2002 that included FLYING LAPTOP, PERSEUS, CERMIT, and the aforementioned BW-1.

=== LEO ===
LEO (Lunarer Erkundungsorbiter; English: Lunar Exploration Orbiter) was the name of a proposed German mission to the Moon, announced by the German Aerospace Center (DLR) Director Walter Doellinger on March 2, 2007. Because the necessary funding for 2009 was diverted elsewhere, the start of the project was delayed indefinitely.

Precise characteristics of the mission were announced in early 2008, and estimated costs were projected to be ca. €350 million (~$514 million) over five years. The mission would involve a lunar orbiter that DLR intended to build and launch in 2012 to map the lunar surface. It would be the first German mission to the Moon and the first European mission to the Moon since SMART-1.

Numerous leading German planetologists, among them Gerhard Neukum, Ralf Jaumann and Tilman Spohn, have condemned the indefinite postponement and argue for resuming the LEO-project.

== See also ==
- French space program
- British space programme – Official efforts to develop space capabilities
- Chinese space program
- Soviet space program – Space exploration program conducted by the Soviet Union from 1951 to 1991
