= Oceansat-1 =

Indian Earth observation satellite

- Names: OceanSat-1; IRS-P4; Indian Remote Sensing satellite-P4
- Mission type: Earth observation Oceanography
- Operator: ISRO
- COSPAR ID: 1999-029A
- SATCAT no.: 25756
- Website: https://www.isro.gov.in/
- Mission duration: 5 years (planned); 11 years (achieved)

Spacecraft properties
- Spacecraft: OceanSat-1
- Bus: IRS-1A
- Manufacturer: Indian Space Research Organisation
- Launch mass: 1,050 kg (2,310 lb)
- Dimensions: 2.80 by 1.98 by 2.57 metres (9 ft 2 in × 6 ft 6 in × 8 ft 5 in)
- Power: 750 watts

Start of mission
- Launch date: 26 May 1999, 06:22 UTC
- Rocket: Polar Satellite Launch Vehicle, PSLV-C2
- Launch site: Satish Dhawan Space Centre, First Launch Pad (FLP)
- Contractor: Indian Space Research Organisation
- Entered service: August 1999

End of mission
- Deactivated: 8 August 2010

Orbital parameters
- Reference system: Geocentric orbit
- Regime: Sun-synchronous orbit
- Perigee altitude: 719 km (447 mi)
- Apogee altitude: 730 km (450 mi)
- Inclination: 98.4°
- Period: 99.0 minutes

Instruments
- Multi-frequency Scanning microwave radiometer (MSMR); Ocean Colour Monitor (OCM)

Oceansat-1 or IRS-P4 was the first Indian satellite built primarily for ocean applications. It was a part of the Indian Remote Sensing Programme satellite series. The satellite carried an Ocean Colour Monitor (OCM) and a Multi-frequency Scanning Microwave Radiometer (MSMR) for oceanographic studies. Oceansat-1 thus vastly augment the IRS satellite system of Indian Space Research Organisation (ISRO) comprising four satellites, IRS-1B, IRS-1C, IRS-P3 and IRS-1D and extend remote sensing applications to several newer areas.

== Launch ==
Oceansat-1 was launched by the Indian Space Research Organisation's PSLV-C2 along with the DLR-Tubsat of Germany and Kitsat-3 of South Korea on 26 May 1999 from the Satish Dhawan Space Centre First Launch Pad of Satish Dhawan Space Centre in Sriharikota, India. It was the third successful launch of Polar Satellite Launch Vehicle (PSLV). It was the 8th satellite of the Indian Remote Sensing Programme (IRS) satellite series of India. Oceansat-1 was operated in a Sun-synchronous orbit. On 26 May 1999, it had a perigee of 719 km (447 mi), an apogee of 730 km (450 mi), an inclination of 98.4°, and an orbital period of 99.0 minutes.

== Instruments ==
Oceansat-1 carried two instruments:

- Multi-frequency Scanning Microwave Radiometer (MSMR), collects data by measuring microwave radiation passing through the atmosphere over the ocean. This offers information including sea surface temperature, wind speed, cloud water content, and water vapour content. MSMR monitor at 6.6 GHz.
- Ocean Colour Monitor (OCM), is a solid state camera literally designed primarily to monitor the colour of the ocean, thereby useful for documenting chlorophyll concentration, phytoplankton blooms, atmospheric aerosols and particulate matter. It is capable of detecting eight spectrums ranging from 400 nm to 885 nm, all in the visible or near infrared spectrums. OCM monitor globally potential fishery zones, ocean currents, and pollution and sediment inputs in the coastal zones. It operates on eight wavelength bands, providing data with a swath width of 1,420 kilometres (880 mi) and at a resolution of 350 metres (0.22 mi).

== Mission ==
Although initially launched with a lifespan of 5 years, Oceansat-1 completed its mission on 8 August 2010, after serving for 11 years.
