= NEXTSat-2 =

NEXTSat-1
- COSPAR ID: 2023-072A
- SATCAT no.: 56743

Spacecraft properties
- Launch mass: 179.9 kg (397 lb)
- Power: 230

Start of mission
- Launch date: May 24, 2023 UTC
- Rocket: Nuri
- Launch site: Naro Space Center

NEXTSat-2 (Korean: 차세대소형위성 2호) is a small satellite developed by the KAIST Satellite Technology Research Center in South Korea, and was launched on May 25, 2023 aboard Nuri. Its main mission is ground detection and measurement of cosmic radiation near the Earth.

== Launch ==
NEXTSat-2 was launched on May 25, 2023 at 6:24 p.m. on board Nuri. After successfully settling into the target orbit, it succeeded in two-way communication with the ground station of the KAIST Satellite Technology Research Center.

At 7:07 p.m., the first satellite signal was received at the King Sejong Station in Antarctica, and at 7:58 p.m., initial communication was made through the Daejeon ground station. In the early morning of the 26th, seven additional communications were made through Daejeon and overseas ground stations. These communications included receiving the satellite's remote metering information and checking whether the satellite's attitude was in a normal sun-oriented state. Through the communications, it was confirmed that the command data processing system function and the communication system's transmission and reception functions were normal.

It will orbit the Earth in a sun-synchronous orbit for two years, orbiting the Earth approximately 15 times a day, performing key missions including ground detection and measurements of cosmic radiation near the Earth.

== Missions ==
=== Cosmic radiation measurement ===
On its upper surface, it is equipped with the 'LEO-DOS' (Korean: 레오도스), a near-Earth cosmic radiation measurement equipment developed by the Korea Astronomy and Space Science Institute (KASI). Its main specifications are weight 1.7 kg, length 19 cm, width 8.5 cm, and height 14.4 cm.

LEO-DOS is equipped with a device to measure charged particles and neutrons. Its main mission is to measure the energy distribution and temporal changes of neutrons and charged particles around the Earth. It has the function of precisely measuring how seriously astronauts are affected by cosmic radiation when they are active outside the space station and providing data that can reveal the effects of neutrons on the human body. It is also expected to explore the changes in cosmic radiation according to the solar activity cycle and the effects on the space environment around the Earth.

=== Test observation ===
NEXTSat-1 conducted initial operations for three months after launch, including functional checks, system stabilization, and test observations of the satellite body, payload, and ground station. In addition, it transmitted photos and videos of Mt. Baekdu, Arctic Ocean and other locations to Earth using the small X-band synthetic aperture radar (SAR) onboard observation equipment.

== See also ==
- NEXTSat-1
