= Orbital Propulsion Centre =

The Orbital Propulsion Centre Lampoldshausen (abbreviated LAM), a Division of ArianeGroup, is the European competence centre for development and production of satellite and orbital propulsion systems (spacecraft propulsion). Founded in 1963 by Ludwig Bölkow as a branch of the Bölkow-Entwicklungs-KG, the centre is situated within the German Aerospace Center (DLR) site at Lampoldshausen, Germany.

== Notable milestones ==
In 1969 the development, qualification and test of bi-propellant propulsion systems for satellite orbit and attitude control system was started, with first application on the French and German Symphonie (satellite), which was successfully launched from the Kennedy Space Center on December 19, 1974.

2001 the RIT-10 gridded Ion thruster fully recovers the Artemis (satellite) mission from a total loss.

With the maiden flight of the Automated Transfer Vehicle - Jules Verne, launched 9 March 2008, the LAM site demonstrated its orbital propulsion competences within man-rated spacecraft as main sub-contractor for the Propulsion Re-boost SubSystem Assemblies.

== Orbital propulsion solutions ==
From orbital propulsion to high-performance propulsion systems and equipment, the Lampoldshausen site covers the full range of requirements for satellites and spacecraft. The Orbital Propulsion Centre supplies chemical and electrical orbital propulsion solutions to all European prime contractors (Airbus, OHB and TAS) and other customers worldwide. Its ability to meet all orbital propulsion requirements is unique.
