= KITSAT-2 =

1993 South Korean satellite

- Names: KITSAT-B; Uribyol-2; KITSAT-OSCAR 25; KO-25
- Mission type: Technology demonstration
- Operator: SaTReC
- COSPAR ID: 1993-061F
- SATCAT no.: 22828
- Website: KAIST SaTReC
- Mission duration: 5 years (planned)

Spacecraft properties
- Spacecraft: KITSAT-2
- Bus: KITSAT-1
- Manufacturer: SaTReC
- Launch mass: 47.5 kg (105 lb)
- Dimensions: 35.2 cm × 35.6 cm × 67 cm (13.9 in × 14.0 in × 26.4 in)
- Power: 30 watts

Start of mission
- Launch date: 26 September 1993, 01:45 UTC
- Rocket: Ariane-40 H10 (V59)
- Launch site: Centre Spatial Guyanais, ELA-2
- Contractor: Arianespace

Orbital parameters
- Reference system: Geocentric orbit
- Regime: Sun-synchronous orbit
- Perigee altitude: 800 km (500 mi)
- Apogee altitude: 823 km (511 mi)
- Inclination: 98.60°
- Period: 100.90 minutes

Instruments
- CCD Earth Imaging System (CEIS); Next Generation Small Satellite Computer; High Speed Modulation Experiment Device; Digital Store and Forward Communication Experiment (DSFCE); Low Energy Electron Detector (LEED)

KITSAT-2 (a.k.a. "Uribyol 2", "KITSAT-OSCAR 25", "KO-25" and "KITSAT-B") was a South Korean experimental Earth observation microsatellite. KITSAT-2 was South Korea's second satellite and was the first to be developed and manufactured domestically by the Korea Advanced Institute of Science (KAIST).

== Launch ==
The satellite was launched into orbit on 26 September 1993, at 01:45 UTC, on the 59th flight of the Ariane-40 H10 launch vehicle. The launch took place in the Centre Spatial Guyanais, French Guiana. KITSAT-2 was a South Korean microsatellite that was launched along with SPOT-3. Its mission was very similar to PoSAT-1 (1993-061D).

== Mission ==
The satellite's mission was to improve and enhance the KITSAT-1 systems, use domestically manufactured components, demonstrate experimental modules and to promote domestic space industry.

== See also ==
- KITSAT-1
- KITSAT-3
- PSLV-C2
