= LEO (spacecraft) =

Proposed German Moon mission

Lunar Exploration Orbiter
- Names: LEO
- Operator: German Aerospace Center
- Mission duration: 4 years (proposed)

Spacecraft properties
- Launch mass: ~650 kg (1,430 lb) including sub satellite

Start of mission
- Launch date: 2012 (proposed)

Orbital parameters
- Reference system: Selenocentric
- Periselene altitude: 50 km (31 mi)
- Epoch: planned

LEO (Lunarer Erkundungsorbiter; English: Lunar Exploration Orbiter) was the name of a proposed German mission to the Moon, announced by the German Aerospace Center (DLR) Director Walter Doellinger on March 2, 2007. Because the necessary funding for 2009 was diverted elsewhere, the start of the project was delayed indefinitely.

Precise characteristics of the mission were announced in early 2008, and estimated costs were projected to be ca. €350 million (~$514 million) over five years. The mission would involve a lunar orbiter that DLR intended to build and launch in 2012 to map the lunar surface. It would be the first German mission to the Moon and the first European mission to the Moon since SMART-1.

Numerous leading German planetologists, among them Gerhard Neukum, Ralf Jaumann and Tilman Spohn, have condemned the indefinite postponement and argue for resuming the LEO-project.

== Design ==
The main satellite will weigh about 500 kilograms and is accompanied by a small sub-satellite, which weighs about 150 kilograms. The intended orbital altitude is about 50 km.

Planned experiments included measurements of lunar gravitational and magnetic fields. The main satellite would have also carried a microwave radar to probe beneath the lunar surface up to a depth of a few hundred meters. At maximum depth the radar would be able to resolve structures up to two meters.

== Science objectives ==
The duration of the mission around the moon will be four years, during which the charting of the entire lunar surface would take place. The survey is to be three-dimensional and in colour with one aim being to provide indications of significant geological formations that could later be of interest for drilling.

The probe was also intended to investigate the moon's magnetic and gravity fields, look for water, and analyse the mineral composition of its surface through a number of means, including photography, radar sensors and spectral analysis.

== See also ==
- German space programme
