= KAIST Satellite Technology Research Center =

South Korean university research center

- 한국과학기술원 인공위성연구센터

Agency overview
- Abbreviation: SaTReC
- Formed: 1989
- Type: Space agency
- Headquarters: Yuseong-gu, Daejeon, South Korea
- Administrator: Park Seong-Ook
- Website: https://satrec.kaist.ac.kr/e_index.php

KAIST Satellite Technology Research Center (SaTReC; Korean: 인공위성연구센터), is a university based research center for satellite technology and applications research.

== Space Programme ==
SaTReC, which is located within the Korea Advanced Institute of Science and Technology (KAIST), promotes the education and training of satellite engineers through research programs in satellite engineering, space science and remote sensing. In 1992, SaTReC developed and launched the first satellite of Korea, KITSAT-1, a scientific microsatellite. Since then, SaTReC continues to develop satellites with scientific and technology demonstration missions.

=== Satellite Missions ===
- Development and Operations of Kitsat-1
- Development and Operations of Kitsat-2
- Development and Operations of Kitsat-3
- Development and Operations of NEXTSat-1
- Development and Operations of NEXTSat-2
