= Institute of Space Propulsion =

German research center

Coordinates: 49.2850°N 9.3750°E

The Institute of Space Propulsion in Lampoldshausen is one of the eight research centers of the German Aerospace Center (DLR).

Approximately 220 people work there in the fields of research and tests of rocket engines. The main purpose of the facility is the operation of test stands for space propulsion on behalf of the European Space Agency (ESA) and in cooperation with the European space industry.

== Test stands ==
The facility has a surface area of approximately 35 ha, on which are seven test stands.

=== Test stand P1 ===
At the altitude test stand P1 are tested small engines with a thrust up to 600 N. In particular, thrusters for Reaction Control Systems (RCS) and Apogee Kick Motors (AKM) fall in this category.

=== Test stand P2 ===
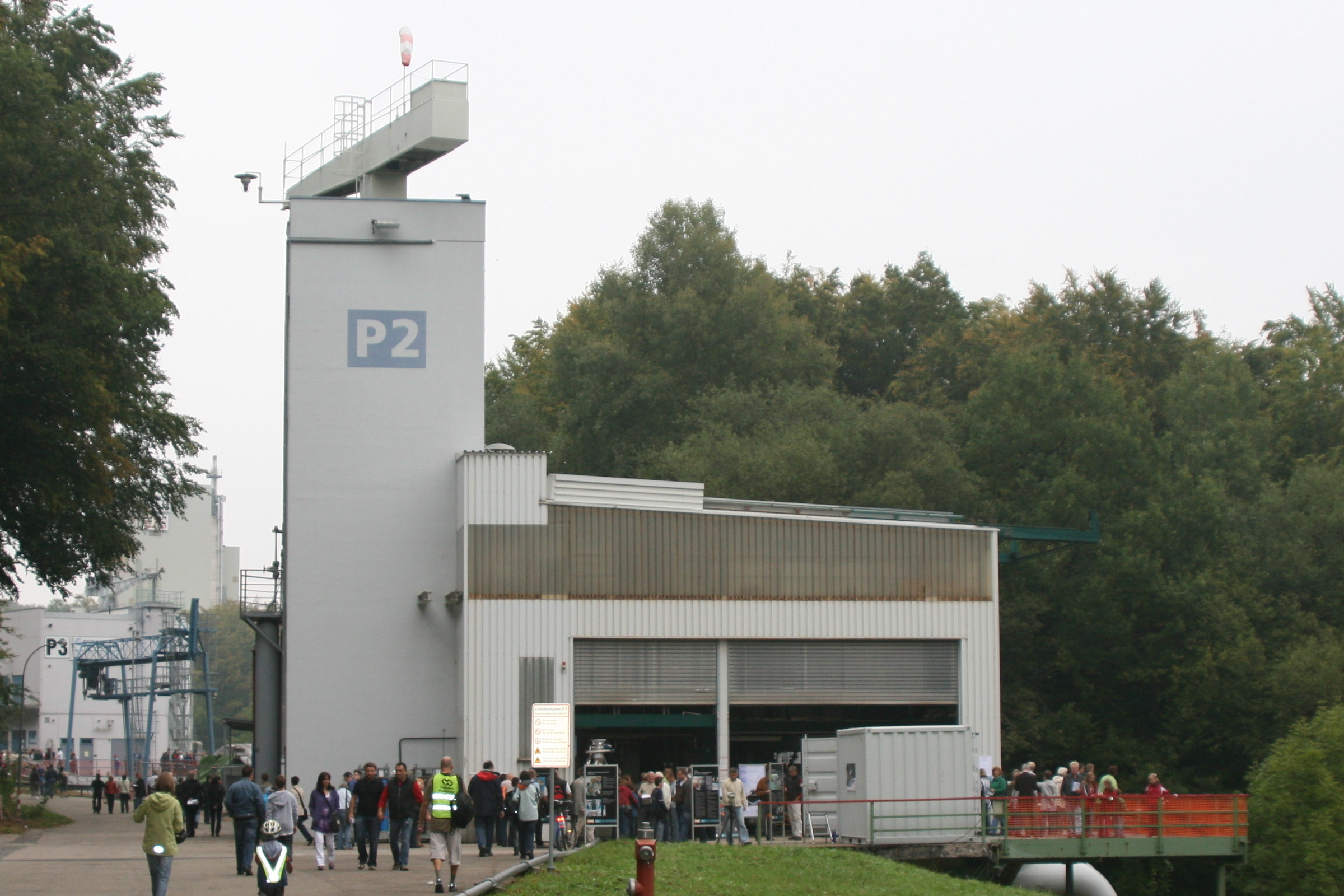
Test stand P2

The test stand P2 is used for testing hypergolic engines with a thrust up to 100 kN under ground conditions.

=== Test stand P3 ===
The test stand P3 is a component test stand for cryogenic propellants. It was set up mainly for the development and tests of combustion chambers, in particular those of the Vulcain 1 and Vinci engines for the European launcher Ariane 5.

=== Test stand P4 (P4.1 / P4.2) ===
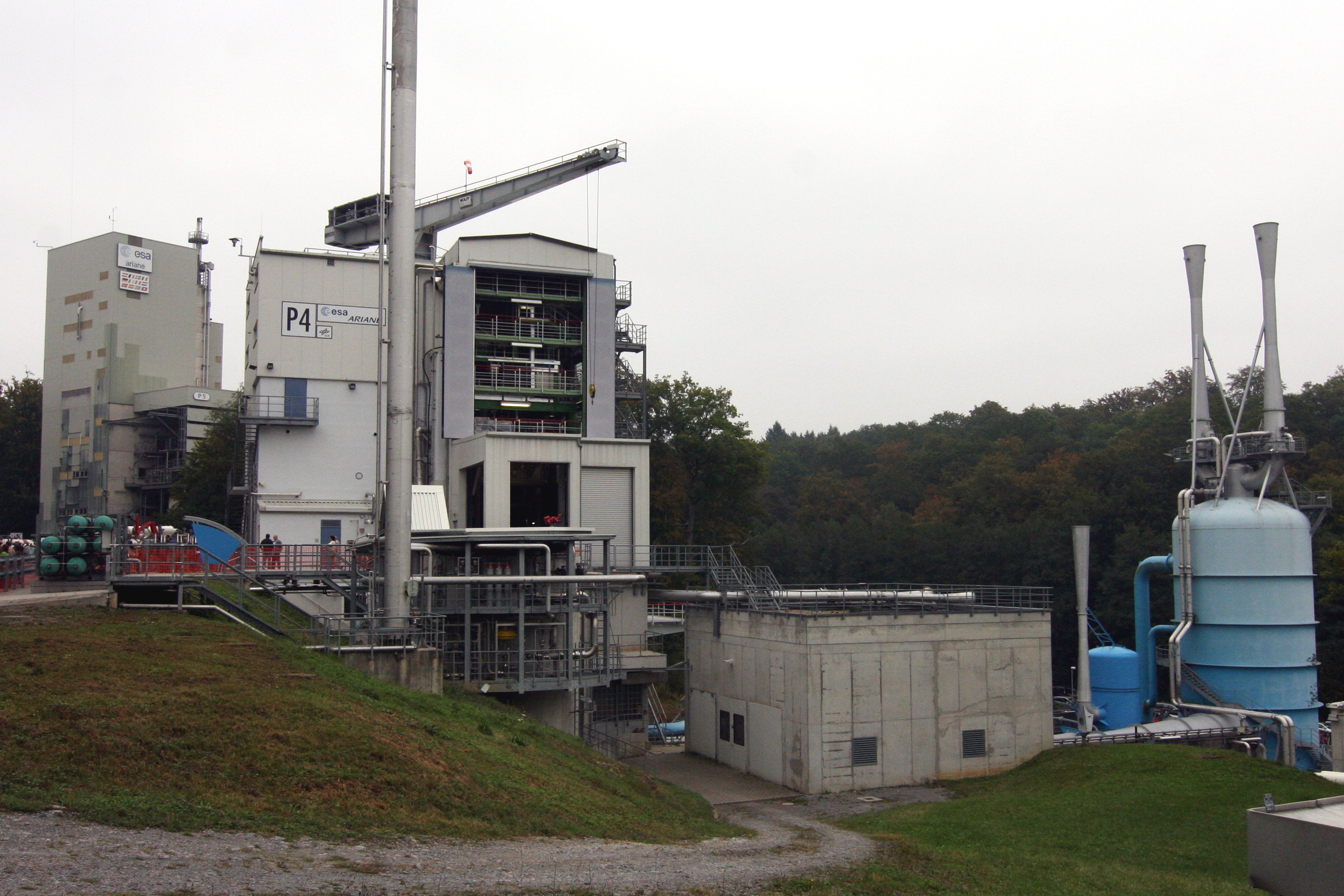
Test stand P4

The vacuum test stand P4 is composed of two test stands P4.1 and P4.2. Tests with the Aestus engine can be carried out at the P4.2 test stand, whereas the test stand P4.1 has been used for the Vinci upper stage engine.

=== Test stand P5 ===
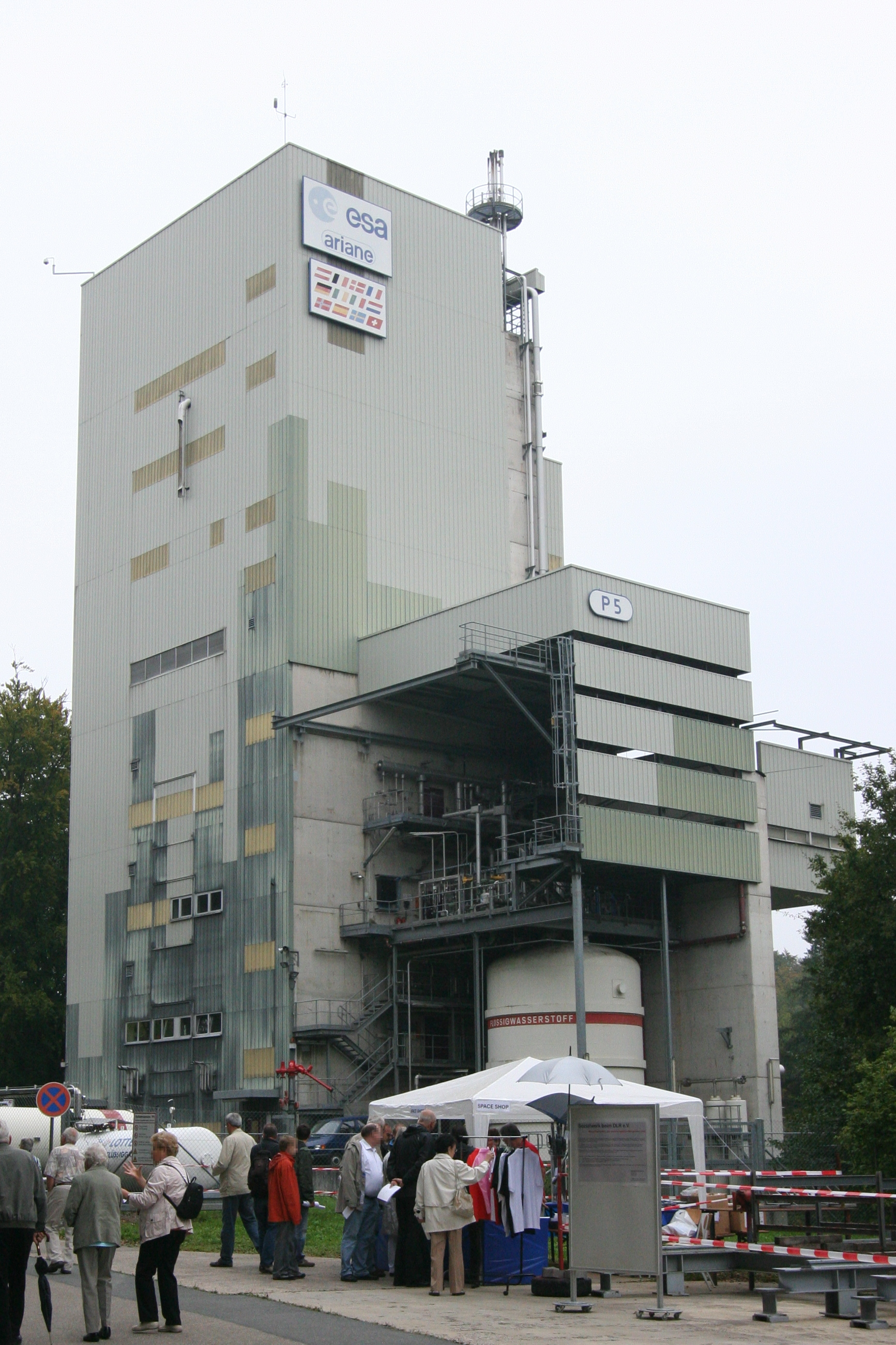
Test stand P5

The test stand P5 has been used for the development and the qualification of the Vulcain and Vulcain 2 engines. Today, it is mainly used to test engines in the frame of the ESA ARTA program.

=== Test stand P6 ===
The test stand P6 is an altitude test stand for cold gas thrusters.

=== Test stand P8 ===
In the frame of a German-French cooperation arose the idea to build a common European Research and Technology test stand P8. The partners SNECMA, Astrium, CNES and DLR made a start on this project in 1992. The main purpose of this test stand is the research about high pressure combustion of hydrogen and oxygen.

== See also ==
- German space programme
