= KITSAT-1 =

First South Korean satellite

- Artist rendering of KITSAT-1 satellite
- Names: KITSAT-A; Korea Institute of Technology Satellite-1; Uribyol-1; KITSAT-OSCAR-23; KO-23; Our Star
- Mission type: Technology demonstration
- Operator: SaTReC
- COSPAR ID: 1992-052B
- SATCAT no.: 22077
- Website: KAIST SaTReC
- Mission duration: 5 years (planned)

Spacecraft properties
- Spacecraft: KITSAT-1
- Bus: SSTL-70
- Manufacturer: Surrey Satellite Technology (SSTL)
- Launch mass: 48.6 kg (107 lb)
- Dimensions: 35.2 cm × 35.6 cm × 67 cm (13.9 in × 14.0 in × 26.4 in)
- Power: 30 watts

Start of mission
- Launch date: 10 August 1992, 23:08:07 UTC
- Rocket: Ariane 42P H-10
- Launch site: Centre Spatial Guyanais, ELA-2
- Contractor: Arianespace

Orbital parameters
- Reference system: Geocentric orbit
- Regime: Low Earth orbit
- Perigee altitude: 1,316 km (818 mi)
- Apogee altitude: 1,328 km (825 mi)
- Inclination: 66.00°
- Period: 112.0 minutes

Instruments
- Digital Store and Forward Communication Experiment (DSFCE); CCD Earth Imaging System (CEIS); Digital Signal Processing Experiment (DSPE); Cosmic Ray Experiment (CRE)

KITSAT-1 or KITSAT-A (Korean Institute of Technology Satellite) is the first South Korean satellite to be launched. Once launched, the satellite was given the nickname "Our Star" (우리별). KITSAT-1 operated in a 818 miles (1,316 km) by 825 miles (1,328 km) low Earth orbit (LEO). Of the 12 satellites launched by South Korea, KITSAT-1 is in the highest orbit. While KITSAT-1 maintains equilibrium by gravity gradient forces, magnetic torque can be used to control attitude if needed. The forecasted lifespan of KITSAT-1 was only five years, but communication with the satellite was maintained for 12 years. Since the launch of KITSAT-1, South Korea launched an additional 36 satellites by 2020.

== Description ==
KITSAT-1 is considered to be a smallsat or microsatellite. KITSAT-1 is the smallest low Earth orbit satellite that has been launched by South Korea.

=== Instruments ===
KITSAT-1's on-board computer (OBC) system uses an OBC186 for the main OBC and an OBC80 as the backup on-board computer system.

KITSAT-1 carried a Digital Store and Forward Communication Experiment (DSFCE), a CCD Earth Imaging System (CEIS), a Digital Signal Processing Experiment (DSPE), and a Cosmic Ray Experiment (CRE).

The CCD Earth Imaging System is equipped with two different cameras. These cameras are a wide-angle camera with a 4 km/pixel resolution and a high-resolution camera with a 400 m/pixel resolution. The two CCD cameras on KITSAT-1 are located on the bottom of the satellite so that the cameras should always be pointed toward Earth

On board was equipment to run the Cosmic Ray Experiment (CRE). The experiment's main purpose was to monitor and study space radiation in a 1,320 km (820 mi) low Earth orbit. These space radiation measurements were to be taken in short and long time frames. The CRE is able to measure high-energy protons, galactic cosmic rays from deep space, and solar cosmic rays from solar flares.

The CRE payload consists of two subsystems. The two subsystems are the Cosmic Particle Experiment (CPE) and the Total Dose Experiment (TDE). The CPE is used to measure the Linear Energy Transfer (LET) spectrum over short time frames, and the TDE is used to measure the total accumulated ionizing radiation dose over long time frames.

== Launch ==
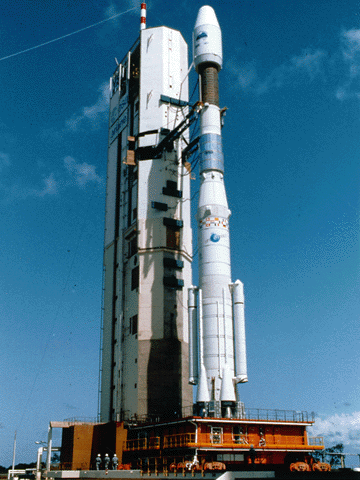
The Ariane 4 launch vehicle, with TOPEX/Poseidon, KITSAT-1, and S/80T on board

Launched in 1992, KITSAT-1, which stands for the Korea Institute of Technology Satellite-1, was the first satellite developed by SaTReC. Developed through a collaborative program between SaTReC and the University of Surrey, United Kingdom, the main objective of the KITSAT-1 program was to acquire satellite technology through the training and education of satellite engineers.

KITSAT-1 was placed in a 1320 km orbit with a 66° orbital inclination. This orbit lies just within the inner Van Allen radiation belt.

The success of the KITSAT-1 program marked the beginning of space technology development for South Korea.

KITSAT-1 was launched from Centre Spatial Guyanais (CSG) on 10 August 1992 on an Ariane 42P H-10 launch vehicle along with NASA's TOPEX/Poseidon satellite and France's S80/T satellite. Its launch weight was 48.6 kg, and it measured 35.2 cm x 35.6 cm x 67 cm. The console of the University of Surrey UoSAT-5 satellite was used.

With this launch, South Korea became the 22nd country to operate a satellite.

== See also ==
- KITSAT-2
- KITSAT-3
