= Sodern =

French space and science company

- Industry: Space instrumentation, optics, defence and neutron
- Founded: 1962
- Headquarters: Limeil-Brévannes, France
- Key people: Franck Poirrier, CEO
- Number of employees: 450+
- Parent: ArianeGroup
- Website: www.sodern.com

Sodern is a French company based in Limeil-Brévannes, near Paris in Ile-de-France, specialized in space instrumentation, optics and neutron analyzers.

Its shareholders are ArianeGroup (90%) and the French Alternative Energies and Atomic Energy Commission (10%).

Sodern develops and produces instruments for space exploration missions or scientific programmes; satellite equipment; neutron generators and neutron interrogation tools.

Since the 2000s, Sodern has participated in space exploration missions to Mars (NASA InSight, India Mars Orbiter, etc.), the moons of Jupiter (NASA Europa Clipper, ESA JUICE, etc.), Venus ( Japanese Mission "Planet C"), Ceres (NASA Dawn), the Moon, etc. It has developed high-tech scientific instruments including the heart of the PHARAO atomic clock, which should deviate by no more than one second every 300 million years, and will verify the effects predicted by the theory of general relativity.

Sodern is one of the world leaders in the development and production of star trackers, instruments that allow satellites to position themselves in space, and neutron tubes.

Called a "key actor" of national defense by French minister Jean-Yves Le Drian, Sodern develops and produces the neutron sources for the French nuclear force, part of the payloads of the French military satellites dedicated to Earth observation, GPS-free positioning systems, etc.

Franck Poirrier, CEO of Sodern, is the representative of the space equipment manufacturers within COSPACE (French Ministerial Committee of Space Coordination).

== History ==
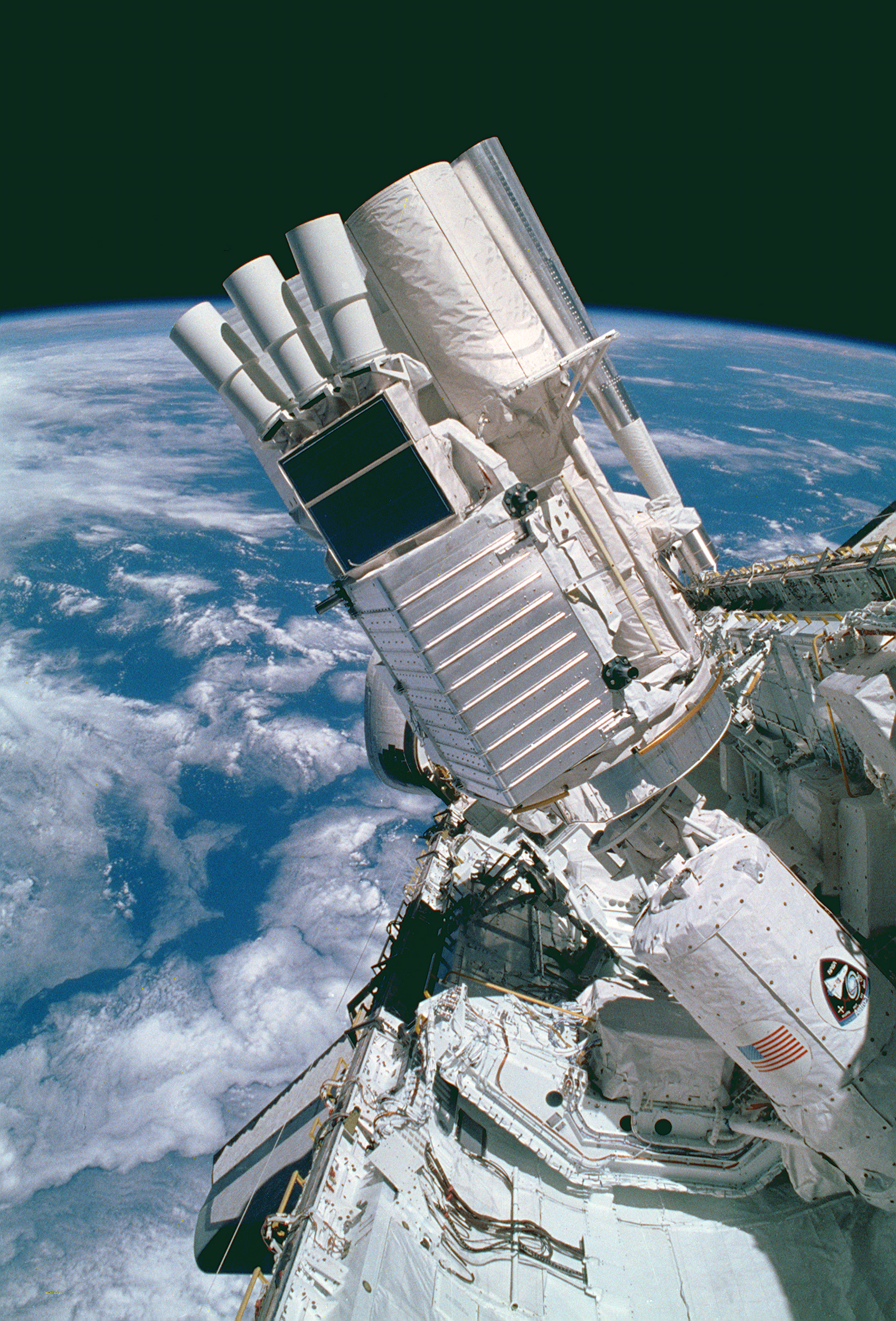
IPS visible on the side of the ASTRO-1 observatory

Sodern was created in 1962 in the Philips' Laboratory of Electronics and Applied Physics (LEP) to launch a first generation of external neutron sources.

In the late sixties, Sodern began to diversify its activities towards optical and high-tech space sensors, for which it is today the global leader. In the early 70s, on CNES demand, Sodern realized the first European Earth sensors, sensors dedicated to the attitude control of the experimental telecommunication satellite Symphonie.

In 1975, the European Space Agency (ESA) subcontracted the manufacturing of multiple instruments for the Spacelab. Sodern created a high-precision system for measuring the spacecraft's attitude (orientation) and for fine-tuning its inertial reference. Sodern also delivered SED04 stars trackers for the Instrument Pointing System (IPS) of the Spacelab observatory. These sensors had a precision of 0.75 seconds of arc, thus the precision needed to see "a golf ball from a 10 km [6.2-mile] distance".

Meanwhile, in the mid-1990s, Sodern enhanced its optical instrumentation activity dedicated to Space.

== Activity ==
Although Sodern activity started in the neutron area, by designing neutron sources for the French deterrent force, it began to diversify into optical sensors and advanced spacecraft instrumentation in the late 1960s.

=== Spatial Instrumentation ===
Nowadays, its activities cover several ranges of space instruments.

- Instruments for satellite attitude control: Earth and Solar sensors and stars trackers, equipping among others Spot, Helios, Eurostar satellites and M51 missile. The first Earth sensor was created in 1977 and boarded on Meteosat I.

- Instruments for Earth observation (cameras, optical and optronic instruments for Spot satellites, Helios, Envisat, etc.).

- Advanced optical instruments for the nuclear industry, the French deterrence force and scientific research, for example Astrium ATV videometers, that can guide its automatic docking to the International Space Station (ISS), and the Infrared Atmospheric Sounding Interferometer (IASI) instrument for MetOp.

- Unique scientific instruments created on demand and integrated aboard satellites, space stations and space vehicles, such as PHARAO atomic clock (developed from the work of the Nobel Laureate Claude Cohen-Tannoudji), critical liquids on DECLIC orbit study instruments, some of the main components of the camera seeking for exoplanets aboard COROT satellite, etc.

==== Stars Trackers ====
As a Star trackers worldwide leader, Sodern takes in 75% of the global market with two other European leaders, Galileo (Italy) and Jena Optronik (Germany).

SED16 sensor has been the first to be used to replace gyroscopes in satellites. It was launched for the first time in May 2002 aboard Spot 5. It has since flown with numerous satellites, including the US communication satellite AMC 12 in February 2005. SED26, his almost similar successor, was launched in April 2005 aboard the satellite Apstar VI. The U.S. probe Dawn, that was made to visit two asteroids Vesta and Ceres, locates itself thanks to SED16 sensors. Those sensors are, within all Sodern's supplied equipment, those farthest from Earth in deep Space.

The SED26 sensor guides, among others, the European Automated Transfer Vehicle ATV, the satellites Helios 2, Orbview 3 and 4, Sorce (from the American manufacturer Orbital), and more than a dozen satellites of the Russian manufacturer ISS-Reshetnev.

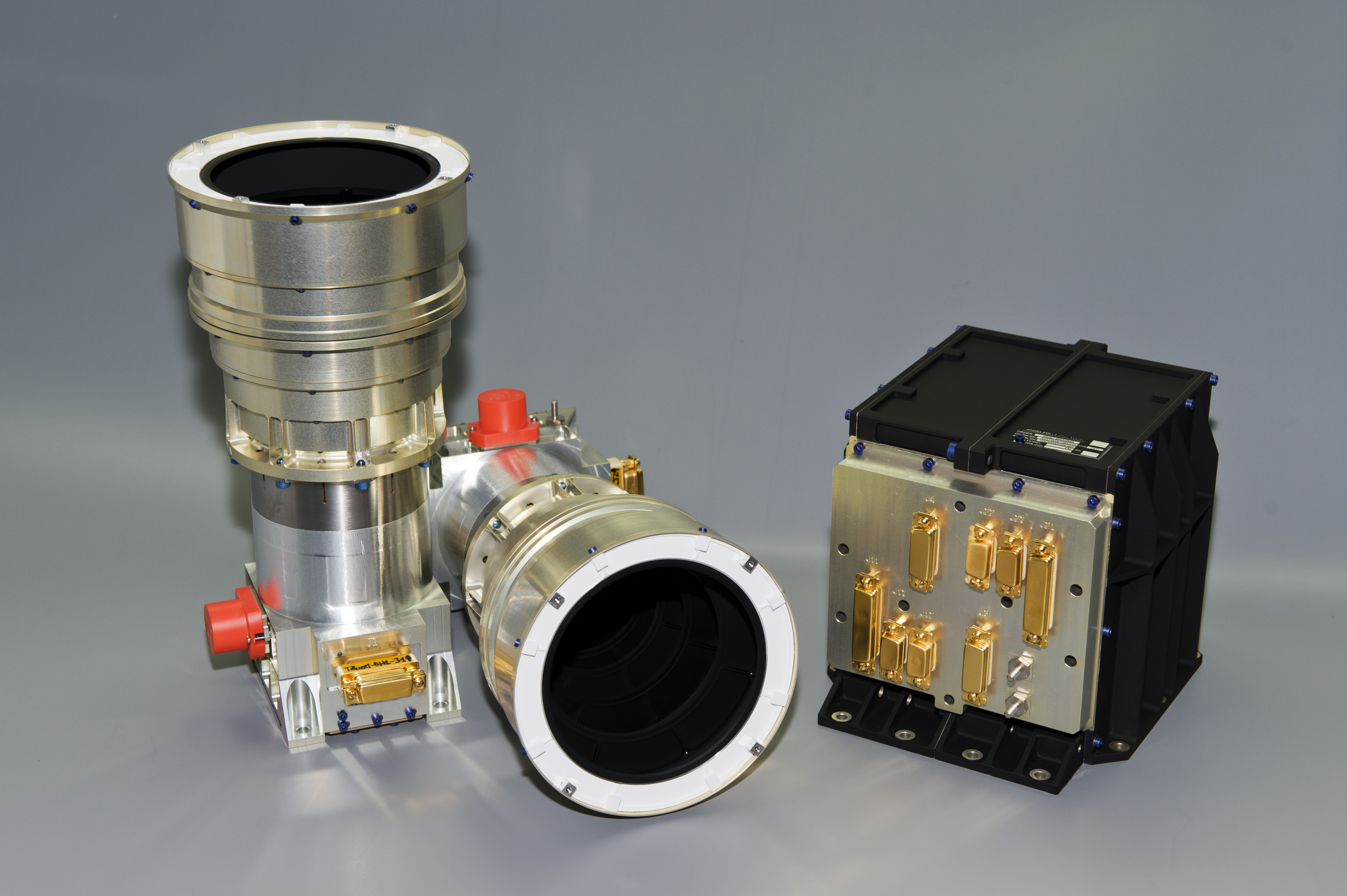
Hydra Star Tracker

In June 2005, Sodern announced the development and production of Hydra sensors, more accurate, more compact and lighter than the SED. Development of the sensor was funded by the European Space Agency (ESA) and The French Space Agency (CNES), and resulted in a radiation-resistant sensor, about half as heavy as the SED (which had a mass of 3 Kg), which consumes only one Watt while operating and which has a precision of one arc second on each of its three axes. Sodern has sold more than a hundred of Hydra sensors so far, the first of which was launched in September 2012, aboard the French satellite Spot 6.

=== Optical Instrumentation ===
In the late 60s, several projects in optical instrumentation have been materialized, such as the strips, bands incorporating all the data exchanged during the operations of air traffic control, as well as the prototype of a mini-camera for the French hospital Val-de-Grâce, detecting gamma and beta rays, to facilitate complete removal of cancerous tumours.

During the 1980s, Sodern designed the focal plans and the optics for the Meris instrument of the European Space Agency satellite Envisat, provided the cameras for the programs Iasi (CNES) and CALIPSO (CNES/NASA), and the dioptric objective of the Corot instrument, which doesn't observe the Earth but looks into Space searching for exoplanets or studying the seismic activity of the stars.

By producing Spot1's camera in 1986 (DTA01), Sodern began a long participation in Earth observation programs, providing cameras as much as optical and optronic instruments for the satellites ranges Spot, Helios, Envisat, etc.

==== Strip Filters ====
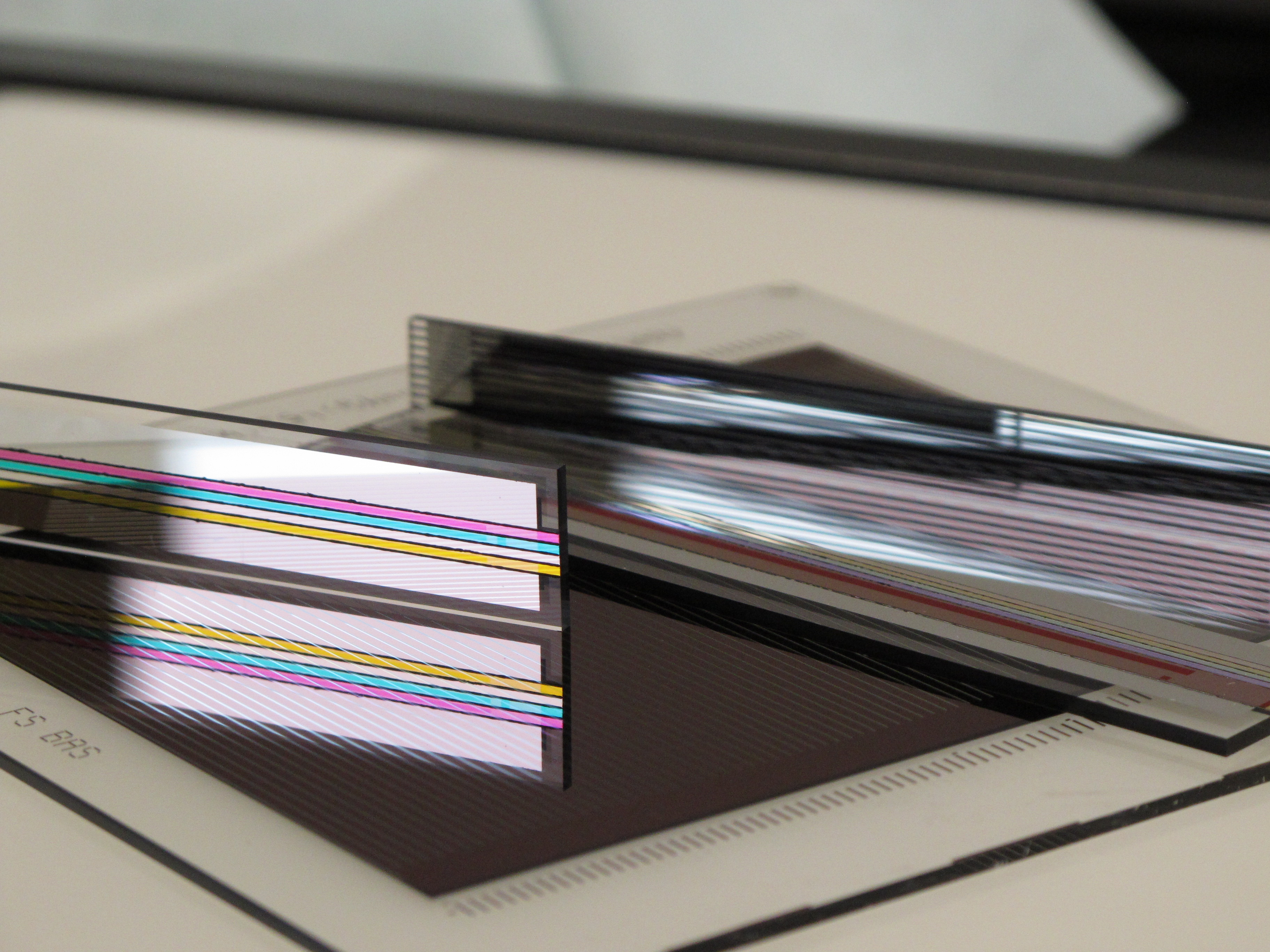
Strip Filters

Optical instrumentation and space being often linked, Sodern has developed a new generation of multi-spectral filters, "strip filters".

The acquisition on multiple spectral bands is enabled by the use of multiple elementary optical filters juxtaposed to each other. Regarding the technology developed by Sodern, this juxtaposition is obtained by assembly of strips, the strip being a sub-set containing all the functions of an elementary filter. The final component is called "assembled strip filter". The number of elementary filters and their characteristics (centring, width, rejection, sloping edges, etc.) depend on the type of the satellite (Earth observation in the visible, infrared, etc.).

=== Neutron ===
In the 1980s, Sodern has developed its civil neutron activity and designed neutron generators (TN26 then GENIE36) used by radioactive waste reprocessing plants for the measurement of transuranic elements. It's also used for in situ measurements in mining and oil logging, for the control of raw materials in metallurgy, for the detection of explosives and in neutron radiography.

In the early 1990s, a first neutron-flanged tube for the oil logging (electrical logging) was designed at the request of Schlumberger, first of an ongoing collaboration.

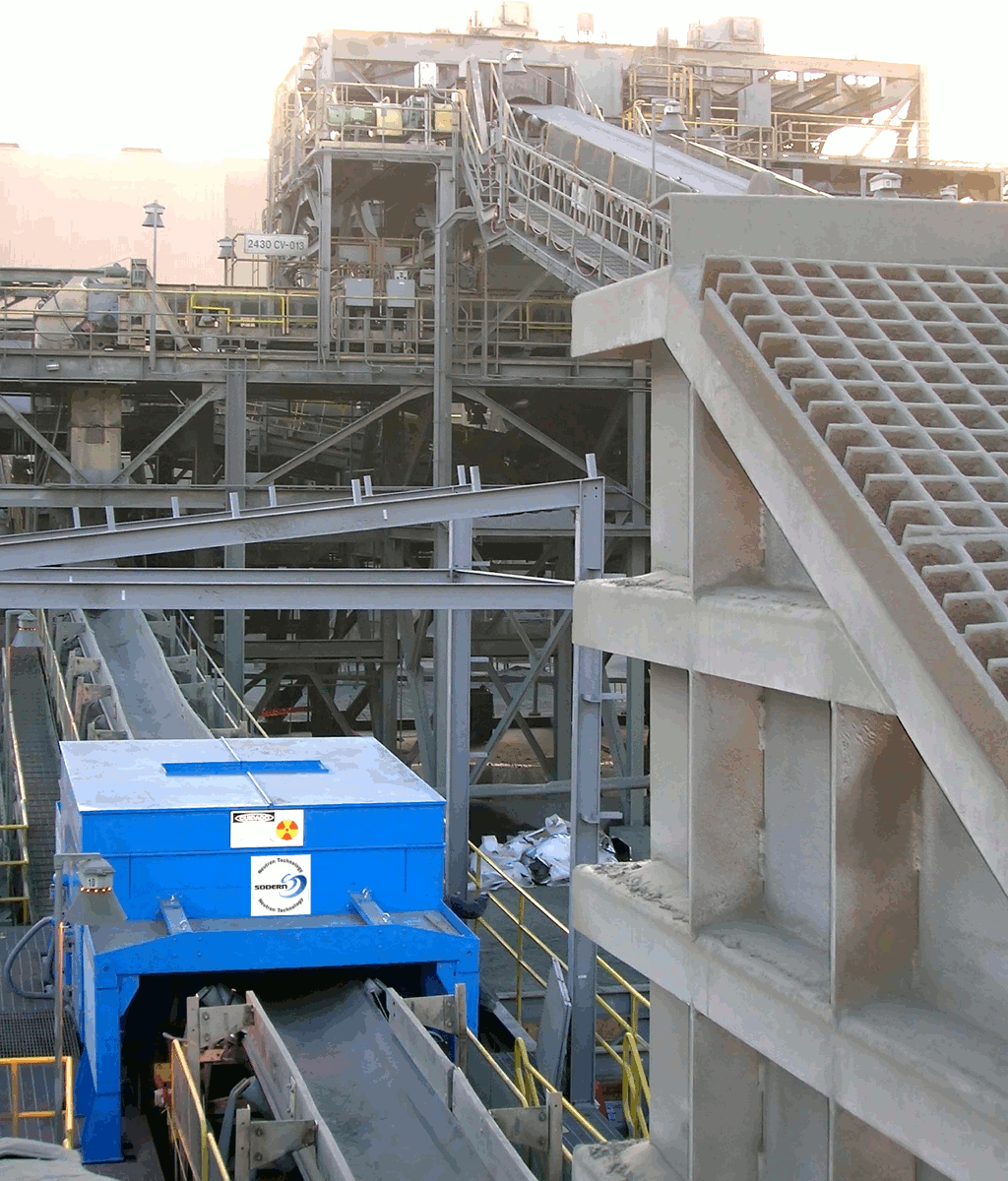
Cement CNA

In the late 1990s, a new project of neutron analyzer was launched, the Continuous Neutron Analyzer (CNA) for the analysis of cements. The principle of material analysis by neutron interrogation was then extended for a vast range of applications: coal, ores (copper, nickel, bauxite, iron), scrap and waste. In 2010, about 70 of those devices had been sold, mostly to cement makers. These CNAs are marketed by another company, PANalytical.

Based on the same principle of analysis, Sodern designed INES, a detector of explosives for luggage at airports. This detector was developed jointly with the French Commissariat à l'Energie Atomique (CEA). It has used a technology called FNA, for Fast Neutron Activation, different from its American competitor (Science Applications International Corp.) technology, which is called TNA, for Thermal Neutron Activation. Sodern FNA detector was based on the fact that explosives often contain a large amount of oxygen and nitrogen but little carbon. A pulsed generator of neutrons then enabled it to detect such elements. The detector was able to analyze 1200 bags per hour, for a detection rate of 99.8%. It has not yet been commercialized.

THOR (military version) and ULIS (civilian version) emerged in the 1990s. They make the detection of explosive and hazardous materials (toxic chemicals products), as illegal ones, possible in abandoned luggage and parcels, from a distance. Their small size allows them to be carried like a suitcase.

NIPPS (Neutron Induced Prompt Photometer System) allows the non-intrusive detection of illicit and dangerous substances. It has been used by the Organisation for the Prohibition of Chemical Weapons (OPCW).

== Management ==
The main shareholder (90%) has been the European company ArianeGroup, the remaining 10% being held by the French Atomic Energy Commission CEA.

In 2017, the company employed about 400 people, including around 60% of engineers.
