= Symphonie =

1974 and 1975 communication satellites

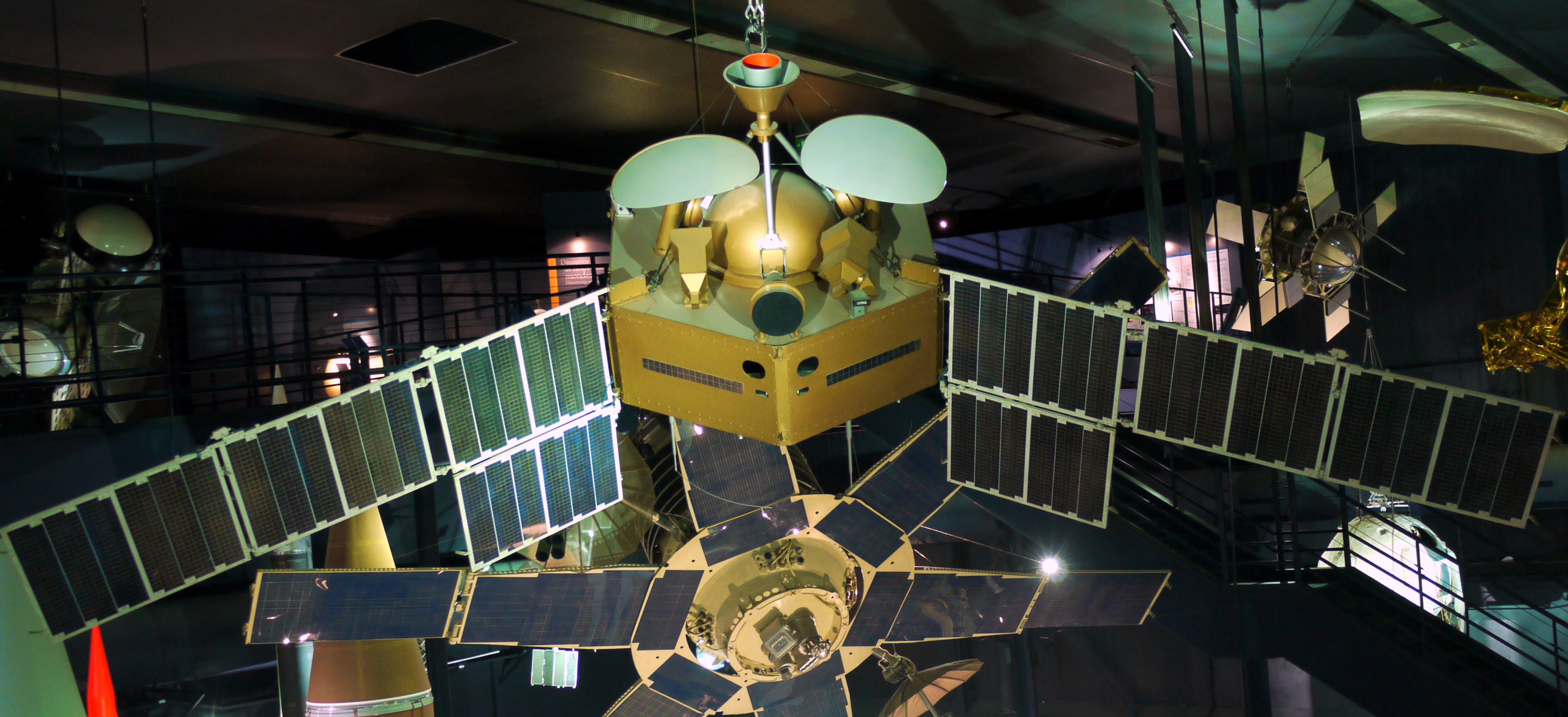
Symphonie 1 (1974)

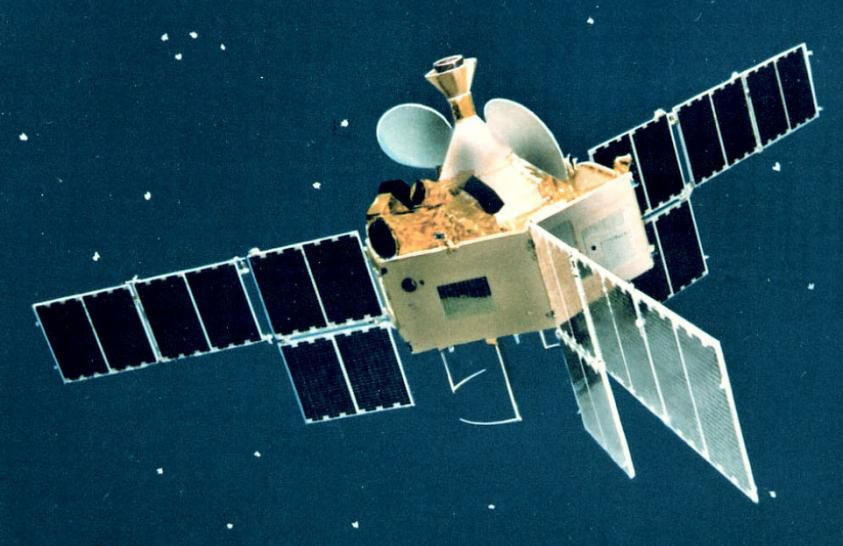
Symphonie 2

The Symphonie satellites (2 satellites orbited) were the first communications satellites built by France and Germany (and the first to use three-axis stabilization in geostationary orbit with a bipropellant propulsion system) to provide geostationary orbit injection and station-keeping during their operational lifetime. After the launch of the second flight model, they comprised the first complete telecommunications satellite system (including an on-orbit spare and a dedicated ground control segment). They were the result of a program of formal cooperation between France and Germany.

== 1963–1970: Beginnings ==
- January 22, 1963: Signing by President Charles de Gaulle and Chancellor Konrad Adenauer of the Élysée Treaty, an agreement for Franco-German cooperation. Start of preliminary studies in France (SAROS project) and in Germany (Olympia project) of communications satellites.
- June 1967: Both countries sign an intergovernmental convention concerning the launch and exploitation of an experimental telecommunication satellite (Symphonie) and the development and construction of earth stations necessary for control of the satellites. Formation of a Franco-German board of directors and executive committee. The committee is headed by two executive secretaries – one German and the other French. Belgium joins the program.
- 1967–1968: A Request for Proposals is launched for the Symphonie satellite, which was answered by two Franco-German consortia. The leaders are, respectively, Nord Aviation (which was to become Aérospatiale after merging with Sud Aviation) for the CIFAS consortium (Consortium Industriel Franco-Allemand pour le satellite Symphonie) and Matra Space for the competing consortium. The CIFAS consortium was selected after the evaluation of bids and undertook, according to the terms of the consultation, a rounding-out of the various roles of the French and German firms in charge of electronic technology.
- 1969: Beginning of a preliminary definition phase of the satellite, and negotiation of the contract and main subcontracts. Establishment of the industrial project team in Les Mureaux (Nord Aviation) and the client-project group in Brétigny-sur-Orge (CNES). Production of mission specifications, satellite specifications and specifications for the control and exploitation segments.

== Industrial Organization ==
Within the bilateral (CNES – GfW) French-German contract, and under industrial prime contractorship of the CIFAS consortium (which was a European economic interest grouping under French law) composed of six companies (three French and three German), their responsibilities were as follows:

=== Aérospatiale (France) ===
- Consortium leader and host of the integrated project team at its centre at Les Mureaux.
- Structures, and thermal-control subsystems and manufacture of all associated panels, mechanisms, thermal hardware and antenna reflectors (Cannes Space Centre).
- Manufacture of the cold gas attitude control system, harness and pyrotechnics (Les Mureaux).
- Integration of mechanical and thermal models (Cannes).
- Integration of the electrical identification model and the first flight model, Symphonie-A (Les Mureaux).

=== Messerschmitt-Bölkow-Blohm (MBB) (Germany) ===
- Attitude and Orbit Control Subsystem (AOCS) (Ottobrunn, near Munich).
- Manufacture of the hot-gas (bi-propellant) thruster system (Ottobrunn and Lampoldshausen).
- Apogee motor (bi-propellant) subsystem (Ottobrunn and Lampoldshausen).
- Mechanical ground-support equipment for integration and transport.
- Contribution of electrical test sets.
- Integration of the qualification prototype and the second flight model, Symphonie-B (Ottobrunn).

=== Thomson-CSF (France) ===
- Super high frequency (SHF)-antenna subsystem for telecommunications payload and VHF-antenna subsystem for the TT&C (Meudon).
- Manufacture of the TT&C system (Gennevilliers and Vélizy-Villacoublay).
- Manufacture of equipment for telecommunications transponders, local oscillators and frequency conversion.
- Electronic test system (EGSE level 1) for ground testing (integration phase and preparation for flight).

=== Siemens AG (Germany) ===
- SHF C-band telecommunications transponder subsystem (Munich).
- Manufacture of equipment for telecommunications transponders, receiving section and intermediary frequency amplification (Munich).
- Contribution of electrical test set.

=== SAT (France) ===
- Solar-array subsystem (Paris and Lannion).
- Manufacture of telemetry encoder (Paris).
- Contribution to electrical test sets.

=== AEG-Telefunken (Germany) ===
- Regulated electric power supply subsystem (Wedel, near Hamburg).
- Manufacture of equipment for the telecommunications transponders, transmission section (Backnang – near Stuttgart – and Ulm).
- Manufacture of SHF modulators and demodulators for onboard telemetry and telecommand.
- Contribution to electrical test sets.

=== Other major contributions ===
- The six CIFAS companies participated in the integrated project team with detached personnel, headed by Pierre Madon (Aérospatiale).
- Belgium officially contributed to the project; its industrial presence included the Ateliers de Constructions Electriques de Charleroi (ACEC) and the space division of ETCA, supplier of the DC-DC converters for the electric power supply; and SAIT for the EGSE test computers.
- French and German equipment manufacturers contributed under contract to the consortium members (notably Sodern, SAFT, Crouzet and Starec in France and Teldix and VFW in Germany).
- Major test facilities used for the qualification and acceptance tests (space environment simulation): SOPEMEA (a subsidiary of CNES in Toulouse) and IABG in (Ottobrunn).
- Calibration of telecommunications performance: Centre National d'Etudes des Telecommunications (CNET, in La Turbie).

== 1970: Satellite development ==
- 1970–1971: Beginning of the Symphonie satellite development program, with a contract signed by General Robert Aubinière (Director General of CNES) and Dr. Mayer (representing the German ministry) Bundesministerium für Wissenschaft und Forschung (BMWF). The CIFAS consortium (organized as a European economic interest grouping and whose administrator at the time was Charles Cristofini) went through several restructurings with the creation of Thomson-CSF, MBB (Messerschmitt Bolkow Blohm), AEG Telefunken and Aérospatiale.
- 1972: The failure of the Europa II launch vehicle and the abandonment of the program (which had been led by the ELDO) triggers a crisis; it is uncertain if development should continue or, if so, how the satellites will be deployed. After some governmental hesitation, the program continues. The satellites will be launched by the American Thor Delta 2914 satellite-launch vehicles, at the cost of a restrictive agreement; any commercial use of Symphonie is forbidden by the U.S. State Department.
- 1973: Integration of the test and qualification models of the satellite.
- 1974: Integration in Les Mureaux of the first flight model (Symphonie-A) and delivery of the satellite.

== Launch and lifespan ==
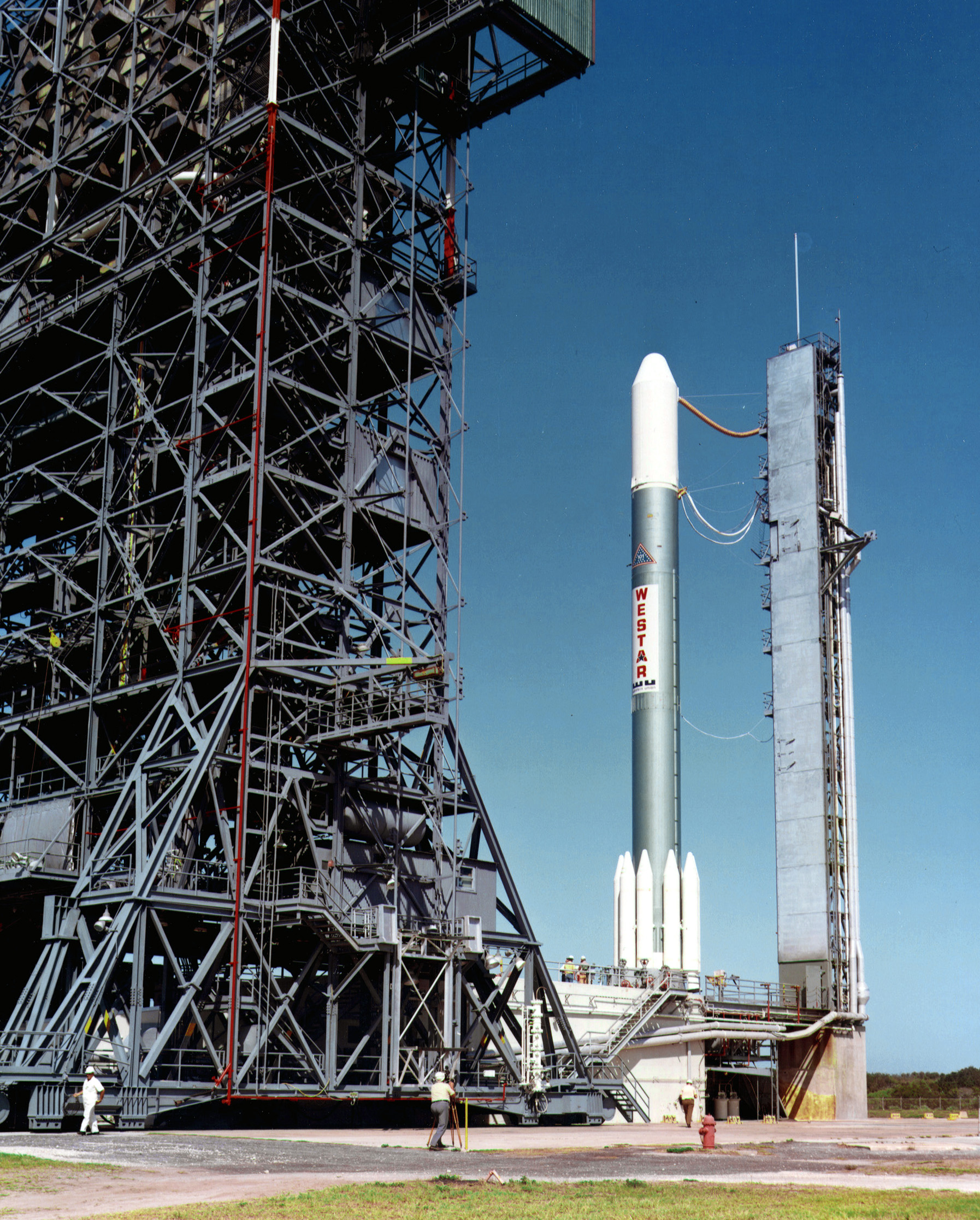
Thor Delta 2914

- 1974: Symphonie-A was successfully launched from the Kennedy Space Center on December 19, 1974, at 2:39 a.m. UT. (9:39 pm on December 18 local time).
- 1975: (January 12) President Valéry Giscard d'Estaing of France and German Chancellor Helmut Schmidt exchange their New Year greetings live in a videoconference, via Symphonie-A in geostationary orbit. Symphonie-A is the first geostationary telecommunications satellite built and operated in Europe; some of its technology is groundbreaking.
- 1975: After its integration at MBB in Ottobrunn and delivery, Symphonie-B is launched from the Kennedy Space Center on August 27, 1975, at 1:42 a.m. UT.(8:42 pm on August 26, local time)
- 1975: The two satellites are positioned in geostationary orbit at 11.5° west, perfectly fulfilling their mission (two coverage zones, Euro-African and America, can fully benefit from 4 wideband transponders of 90 MHz each); they are the stars of the 1975 Geneva Telecom Show.
- 1977–1979: For two years beginning in June 1977, Symphonie-A is repositioned over the Indian Ocean at 49° east, where it carries out experiments with India and China.
- February 4–7, 1980: An international colloquium is held in Berlin concerning the technical and operational results of the program. Among the presentations, Professor Hubert Curien (then-president of CNES) declared in brief, "Symphonie is the father of Ariane"; it served as the catalyst for the European decision to develop a heavy launch vehicle.
- August 12, 1983: Symphonie-A makes its final manoeuvre to a graveyard orbit, and is de-activated after 8 1/2 years of service.
- December 19, 1984: Exactly ten years after the launch of Symphonie-A, Symphonie-B is also deactivated and placed in a graveyard orbit after nine years of active service. The Symphonie satellites operated successfully for double their expected lifespans, performing hundreds of experiments and expanding the horizons of telecommunications in space.

== Uses ==
Symphonie was the forerunner for numerous telecommunications services. Its prohibition on commercial use may have paradoxically induced a larger program for experimentation of space telecommunications than ever before – both in the number of participating countries and diversity of field applications. As an example of the extent of its use, 40 countries participated in links via Symphonie A and B (east-west and north-south) – from Quebec to Argentina, from Finland to Reunion Island and from China to Indonesia. The Symphonie A and B experiments may be divided into two types:

- Humanitarian, cultural and educational experiments.
- Technical and scientific experiments.

To these types operational experiments may be added, notably for links between metropolitan France and its overseas departments for telephony and television via satellite. From this viewpoint Symphonie was a forerunner of the French national programs Telecom-1 & 2 and TDF 1 & 2, and the German programs TV-SAT and DFS Kopernikus. The wideband transponders, with their operational flexibility, made it possible to test all-access techniques (single or multiple) and modulation: FDMA (frequency sharing), TDMA (time sharing) and SSMA (spread spectrum). Symphonie terrestrial stations with antennas of various diameters from 16 to 2.2 meters (fixed, portable and mobile) contributed to the renown of the programme around the world. + Several demonstrations were:

- Links between United Nations headquarters in New York and Geneva and the UN Blue Helmet squadrons in Jerusalem and Ismaïlia – inaugurating the future communications mode VSAT (very small aperture terminal), using small-diameter ground antennas.
- Educational television in Africa, particularly in Côte d'Ivoire and Gabon.
- Intercultural exchanges via teleconferencing, telerehabilitation and telemedicine, notably between France and Quebec.
- Occasional tele-transmission services (emergency links to disaster areas for the Red Cross, sports reporting and so on).
- High-speed, bidirectional links between computers – a forerunner of transcontinental data communications and the Internet.
- Synchronization of atomic clocks on an intercontinental scale, to obtain a very high stability of universal time – a forerunner to navigation and positioning satellites GPS and Galileo.
- Regional-level tests for mixed analog and digital television and radio broadcasting (now used in many countries – for example Iran, India and China).

One opportunity to demonstrate Symphonie's utility in 1978 was not used; it could have been utilized in Kolwezi (the intervention of French troops in Zaire to protect Europeans living in Katanga), if the French chiefs of staff had followed the above-mentioned UN example rather than calling upon logistical support from the United States.

== After Symphonie ==
Symphonie's ten years of service have been credited with developing the maturity and reliability of space technology, at a time when telecommunications operators were thinking in terms of cables and ground microwave links. After Intelsat (a pioneer in intercontinental telephony), Symphonie led to the development of regional systems with a number of applications (including tele-distribution, tele-education and reliable radio-electrical access) for use in isolated areas with no ground infrastructure and low population density. The Symphonie program was also a training program; it trained engineers, operators and satellite users, who acquired their expertise through the program and distributed it on the European and international level.

Afterwards, new European programs followed and enabled Europe to attain excellence in the field of space telecommunications. The technical success of this precursor program, the demonstration in orbit of the quality of technology born in Europe and the diverse uses benefiting many countries and communities make Symphonie one of the major bases of Europe's success in space.

On the industrial level, it helped launch Europe into major space programs and spurred an industrial restructuring which transformed national industries into European groups. Most of Symphonie's industrial partners contributed to the genesis of the Spacebus programs, and to commercial applications in space communications and direct-to-home TV broadcasting.

== Firsts ==
Symphonie was the:

- First three-axis stabilized communications satellite in geostationary orbit with a bipropellant rocket propulsion system (to ensure geostationary orbit injection and orbit control during its entire lifespan).
- First European communications satellite system.

== Satellites ==
- Symphonie A (a.k.a. Symphonie 1, COSPAR 1974-101A), launched 19 December 1974 at 2:39 UT from Kennedy Space Center (Cape Canaveral) LC-17B aboard Delta 2914 rocket to geostationary orbit. Mass of satellite 400 kg, 230 kg in orbit. Planned lifetime was 5 years. Decommissioned August 12, 1983 (moved to graveyard orbit). Mission duration: 8 1/2 years.
- Symphonie B (a.k.a. Symphonie 2, COSPAR 1975-077A), launched 27 August 1975 at 1:42 UT from Kennedy Space Center (Cape Canaveral) LC-17A aboard Delta 2914 rocket to geostationary orbit. Mass of satellite 400 kg, 230 kg in orbit. Planned lifetime was 5 years. Decommissioned December 19, 1984 (moved to graveyard orbit). Mission duration: 9 years.

== See also ==
- French version of this article

== Sources ==
- "80 years of passion: the Cannes Centre from 1919 to 1999", Editions Version Latine 1999, France.
