= NEXTSat-1 =

South Korean satellite launched in 2018

Spacecraft properties
- Manufacturer: KAIST Satellite Technology Research Center
- Launch mass: 107 kilograms (236 lb)

Start of mission
- Launch date: 4 December 2018 UTC-7
- Rocket: Falcon 9
- Launch site: Vandenberg

NEXTSat-1 (Korean: 차세대소형위성 1호) is a small satellite developed by the KAIST Satellite Technology Research Center in South Korea.

== History ==
=== Development ===
NEXTSat-1 was developed to study the birth of Stars and space storms, and to verify the performance of key components of satellites. A total of 32.4 billion won was invested in satellite development.

Development began in June 2012, and satellite assembly and performance testing were completed in July 2017.

On October 21, 2018, it arrived at the launch site, Vandenberg Space Force Base, on October 21, 2018.

=== Launch ===
It was launched on December 4, 2018, at approximately 3:34 a.m. from Vandenberg Air Force Base aboard a SpaceX Falcon 9. First contact was made 80 minutes later with the Svalbard Ground Station of Norway, in the North Pole, and the second contact was made approximately 100 minutes later.

At 10:05 a.m., 6 hours and 31 minutes after launch, the satellite successfully entered a normal orbit at an altitude of 575 km through its first communication with a domestic ground station. The KAIST Satellite Technology Research Center confirmed that the solar panels were normally deployed and the satellite's overall condition, including battery voltage and internal temperature, was good.

Three CubeSats selected by Seoul National University and Korea Aerospace University in the 2015 CubeSat Competition were launched along with NEXTSat-1. The main missions of these CubeSats are to conduct various research such as exploration of areas of interest, verification of dual-frequency GPS receivers, and observation of discharge phenomena in the upper atmosphere above the stratosphere.

The three-dimensional stacked memory developed by KAIST, the high-precision star tracker developed by Satrec Initiative for satellite attitude control, and the standard onboard computer manufactured by AP Satellite as a satellite brain were all loaded for testing in the extreme environment of space.

== Design and missions ==
The local production rate of parts is 95%. NEXTSat-1 carries a space storm research payload that measures cosmic radiation and Plasma. Additionally, it is designed so that the payloads within the satellite can be directly inserted into another satellite and start operating immediately.

NEXTSat-1 has a mission to measure cosmic radiation and plasma conditions due to solar flares for about two years, and to send various observation data that can be used to forecast space weather and examine the impact of space environments on Earth. In addition, it has a payload that observes the Near-infrared band, and one of its main missions is to provide image data to domestic related organizations by studying the history of star birth and the formation and evolution of Galaxies.
