= KITSAT-3 =

1999 South Korean satellite

- Names: Uribyol-3
- Mission type: Technology demonstration, Remote sensing
- Operator: SaTReC
- COSPAR ID: 1999-029A
- SATCAT no.: 25757
- Website: KAIST SaTReC
- Mission duration: 3 years (planned); 4.5 years (achieved)

Spacecraft properties
- Spacecraft: KITSAT-3
- Manufacturer: SaTReC
- Launch mass: 110 kg (240 lb)
- Dimensions: 49.5 cm × 60.4 cm × 85.2 cm (19.5 in × 23.8 in × 33.5 in)
- Power: 180 watts

Start of mission
- Launch date: 26 May 1999, 06:22 UTC
- Rocket: PSLV-C2
- Launch site: Satish Dhawan Space Centre,
- Contractor: Indian Space Research Organisation (ISRO)

End of mission
- Deactivated: December 2003

Orbital parameters
- Reference system: Geocentric orbit
- Regime: Sun-synchronous orbit

Instruments
- Multispectral Earth Imaging System (MEIS); Space ENvironment Scientific Experiment (SENSE)

KITSAT-3 was a South Korean remote sensing minisatellite which carried MEIS (Multispectral Earth Imaging System) and SENSE (Space ENvironment Scientific Experiment) instruments to low Earth orbit (LEO). Launched on 26 May 1999 by Indian space agency Indian Space Research Organisation (ISRO), on orbit the satellite was renamed to Uribyol-3. Manufactured by KAIST Satellite Technology Research Center (SaTReC), KITSAT-3 was developed with experience from KITSAT-1 and KITSAT-2 (no heritage to the KITSAT-1 and KITSAT-2 bus) and was the first independently designed South Korean satellite.

== Launch ==
Kitsat-3 was launched in the PSLV-C2 mission by 26 May 1999 by Indian space agency ISRO at 06:22 UTC from Satish Dhawan Space Centre in India. The launch was the first commercial launch by ISRO of its launch vehicle (PSLV-C2) and US$1.0 million (equivalent to US$1.93 million in 2025) was charged by the Indian agency for launching and injecting the satellite in the low Earth orbit.

== Mission highlights ==
- First independently designed South Korean satellite
- First commercial flight of the launch vehicle, Polar Satellite Launch Vehicle (PSLV)
- Spacecraft attitude was first captured and 3-axis stabilized on 30 May 1999
- First image obtained on 31 May 1999
- Solar panels deployed on 24 June 1999
- Design for life of 3 years
- However, operations ended in December 2003 (4.5 years achieved)

== See also ==
- KITSAT-1
- PSLV-C2
