= PSLV-C2 =

1999 Indian space launch mission

- Model of the PSLV launch vehicle
- Names: Polar Satellite Launch Vehicle
- Mission type: Deployment of three satellites
- Operator: ISRO
- Website: ISRO website
- Mission duration: 1117.5 seconds

Spacecraft properties
- Spacecraft: Polar Satellite Launch Vehicle
- Spacecraft type: Expendable launch vehicle
- Manufacturer: Indian Space Research Organisation
- Launch mass: 294,000 kg (648,000 lb)
- Payload mass: 1,202 kg (2,650 lb)

Start of mission
- Launch date: 26 May 1999, 06:22 UTC
- Rocket: Polar Satellite Launch Vehicle
- Launch site: Sriharikota Launching Range
- Contractor: ISRO

Orbital parameters
- Reference system: Sun-synchronous orbit
- Regime: Low Earth orbit

Payload
- Oceansat-1; KITSAT-3; DLR-Tubsat

PSLV-C2 was the second operational launch and overall fifth mission of the Polar Satellite Launch Vehicle (PSLV) program. This launch was also the forty-third launch by Indian Space Research Organisation (ISRO) since its first mission on 1 January 1962. The vehicle carried three satellites which were deployed in the Sun-synchronous low Earth orbit. The vehicle carried India's first remote sensing satellite Oceansat-1 (IRS-P4) as the main payload. It also carried South Korean satellite KITSAT-3 and German satellite DLR-Tubsat as auxiliary payloads. PSLV-C2 was the first Indian Expendable launch vehicle to carry and deploy more than one satellite in a mission. This was also India's and ISRO's first commercial spaceflight where South Korea and Germany each paid US$1.0 million (equivalent to $1.89 million in 2024) to ISRO for launching their satellites.

== Mission parameters ==
- Mass:
  - Total liftoff weight: 294,000 kg (648,000 lb)
  - Payload weight: 1,202 kg (2,650 lb)
- Overall height: 44.4 m (146 ft)
- Propellant:
  - First stage: Solid HTPB based (138.0 + 54 tonnes)
  - Second stage: Liquid UDMH + N_{2}O_{4} (4.06 tonnes)
  - Third stage: Solid HTPB based (7.2 tonnes)
  - Fourth stage: Liquid MMH + N_{2}O_{4} (2.0 tonnes)
- Engine:
  - First stage: S139
  - Second stage: Vikas
  - Third stage:
  - Fourth stage: 2 x PS-4
- Thrust:
  - First stage: 4628 + 662 x 6 kN
  - Second stage: 725 kN
  - Third stage: 340 kN
  - Fourth stage: 7.2 x 2 kN
- Altitude: 735.1 km (456.8 mi)
- Maximum velocity: 7,490 m/s (24,600 ft/s) (recorded at time of fourth stage ignition)
- Duration: 1117.5 seconds

== Payload ==
PSLV-C2 carried and deployed total three satellites. Oceansat-1 (IRS-P4) was the main payload and KITSAT-3 and DLR-Tubsat were two auxiliary payloads that were mounted on PSLV-C2 equipment bay diametrically opposite to each other. Oceansat-1, was mounted on top of the equipment bay. In the flight sequence, IRS-P4 was injected first, followed by KITSAT-3 and then DLR-Tubsat.

Country	Name	No.	Mass	Type	Objective
India	Oceansat-1	1	1050 kg	Indian Remote Sensing Satellite	Remote sensing
South Korea	KITSAT-3	1	107 kg	Microsatellite	Test and demonstrate new satellite bus & its payloads
Germany	DLR-Tubsat	1	45 kg	Microsatellite	Test newly developed attitude control system

== Launch and planned flight profile ==
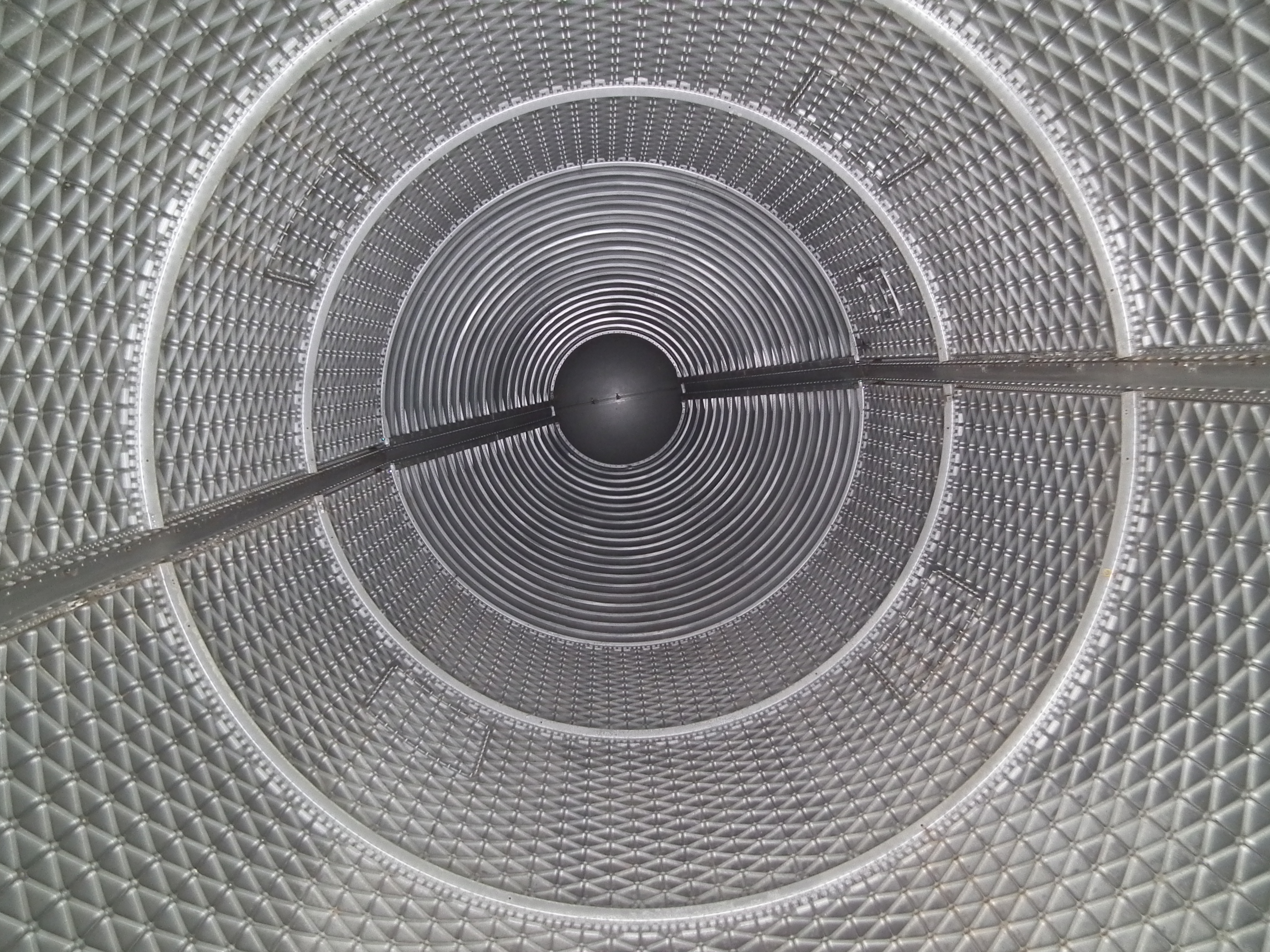
Heat shield of PSLV displayed at HAL heritage center.

PSLV-C2 was launched at 06:22 UTC on 26 May 1999 from Satish Dhawan Space Centre (then called "Sriharikota Launching Range"). The mission was planned with pre-flight prediction of perigee and apogee of 727 km (452 mi). The actual perigee was 723.1 km, apogee was 735.1 km. Following was the planned flight profile.

Stage	Time (seconds)	Altitude (kilometer)	Velocity (meter/sec)	Event	Remarks
First stage	T+0	0.02	450	First stage ignition	Lift-off
First stage	T+1.2	0.02	450	Ignition of 4 ground-lit strap-on motors	
First stage	T+25.1	2.43	540	Ignition of 2 air-lit strap-on motors	
First stage	T+68.1	23.10	1,100	Separation of 4 ground-lit strap-on motors	
First stage	T+90.1	40.21	1,520	Separation of 2 air-lit strap-on motors	
First stage	T+117.7	72.08	1,970	First stage separation	
Second stage	T+117.9	72.38	1,970	Second stage ignition	
Second stage	T+162.7	120.71	2,210	Heat shield separation	
Second stage	T+167.7	126.60	2,260	Closed-loop guidance initiation	
Second stage	T+284.5	254.03	4,070	Second stage separation	
Third stage	T+285.7	255.46	4,060	Third stage ignition	
Third stage	T+506.4	533.57	5,970	Third stage separation	
Fourth stage	T+584.4	605.44	5,870	Fourth stage ignition	
Fourth stage	T+991.7	728.25	7,490	Fourth stage thrust cut-off	
Fourth stage	T+1017.5	728.66	7,490	Oceansat-1 (IRS-P4) separation	
Fourth stage	T+1067.5	729.51	7,490	KITSAT-3 separation	
Fourth stage	T+1117.5	730.41	7,490	DLR-Tubsat separation	

The launch was witnessed by Atal Bihari Vajpayee (then Prime Minister of India), Murli Manohar Joshi, Vasundhara Raje and N. Chandrababu Naidu.

== See also ==
- Indian Space Research Organisation
- Polar Satellite Launch Vehicle
