= Lampoldshausen =

Coordinates: 49°16′N 9°24′E

Lampoldshausen is a small village on the southern edge of the Harthausen Forest near Möckmühl in Baden-Württemberg, Germany.

== Aerospace Village ==
Within the global Aerospace community Lampoldshausen is known as Aerospace Village by the Institute of space propulsion of the German Aerospace Center (DLR) for research and hot firing test of rocket engines, especially for Ariane launchers as well as the Orbital Propulsion Centre of ArianeGroup, the European competence centre for spacecraft propulsion.

The ArianeGroup site is the European competence centre for development and production of satellite and orbital platform propulsion systems. It produces chemical and electrical propulsion systems, high-precision components for satellite and launcher attitude control systems, and the complete UPS (Unified Propulsion System).

Additionally, Lampoldshausen is part of the Community of Ariane Cities (CVA).
