= DLR-Tubsat =

German satellite

- Names: TUBSAT-C; TUBSAT
- Mission type: Experimental
- Operator: Technische Universität Berlin
- COSPAR ID: 1999-029C
- SATCAT no.: 25758
- Range: 713 kilometres (443 mi)
- Apogee: 732 kilometres (455 mi)

Spacecraft properties
- Spacecraft: DLR-Tubsat
- Manufacturer: Technische Universität Berlin & DLR
- Launch mass: 45 kg (99 lb)
- Dimensions: 32 x 32 x 32 cm
- Power: 120 W

Start of mission
- Launch date: 06:22, May 26, 1999 (UTC)
- Rocket: PSLV-C2
- Launch site: Sriharikota Launching Range
- Contractor: ISRO

End of mission
- Deactivated: Not known

Orbital parameters
- Reference system: Sun-synchronous orbit
- Regime: Low Earth orbit
- Inclination: 98.36°
- Period: 99.24 minutes

DLR-Tubsat (a.k.a. TUBSAT) was a German remote sensing microsatellite, developed in a joint venture between Technische Universität Berlin (TUB) and German Aerospace Center (DLR). TU Berlin was responsible for the satellite bus and DLR was responsible for the payload. The satellite was launched into orbit on 26 May 1999, on the fifth mission of the PSLV program PSLV-C2. The launch took place in the Sriharikota Launching Range. The satellite had an expected life of one year.

== Mission objectives ==
The prime objective of DLR-Tubsat was to test the attitude control system (S/C attitude recovery from hibernation). The secondary objective of the mission was to test a TV camera system for disaster monitoring with the goal of the introduction of an interactive Earth observation concept, where the target is not identified in advance, a search action may be involved, or a particular target region has to be followed visually from orbit.

== Specifications ==
- Dimension: 32 x 32 x 32 cm
- Launch mass: 45 kg (99 lb)
- Solar panel: Four
- Batteries: Four NiH2
- Video camera: Three CCD
  - 16 mm wide-angle camera with black-and-white chip
  - 50 mm standard-angle camera with color CCD chip
  - 1000 mm telephoto lens camera with black-and-white chip
- Attitude control system: Three wheel / gyro pairs
- Reaction wheels: Three
- Laser gyro: Three
- VHF / UHF TT & C system
- S band transmitter and antenna

== See also ==
- PSLV-C2
