= Visual Monitoring Camera =

Camera mounted on the Mars Express spacecraft

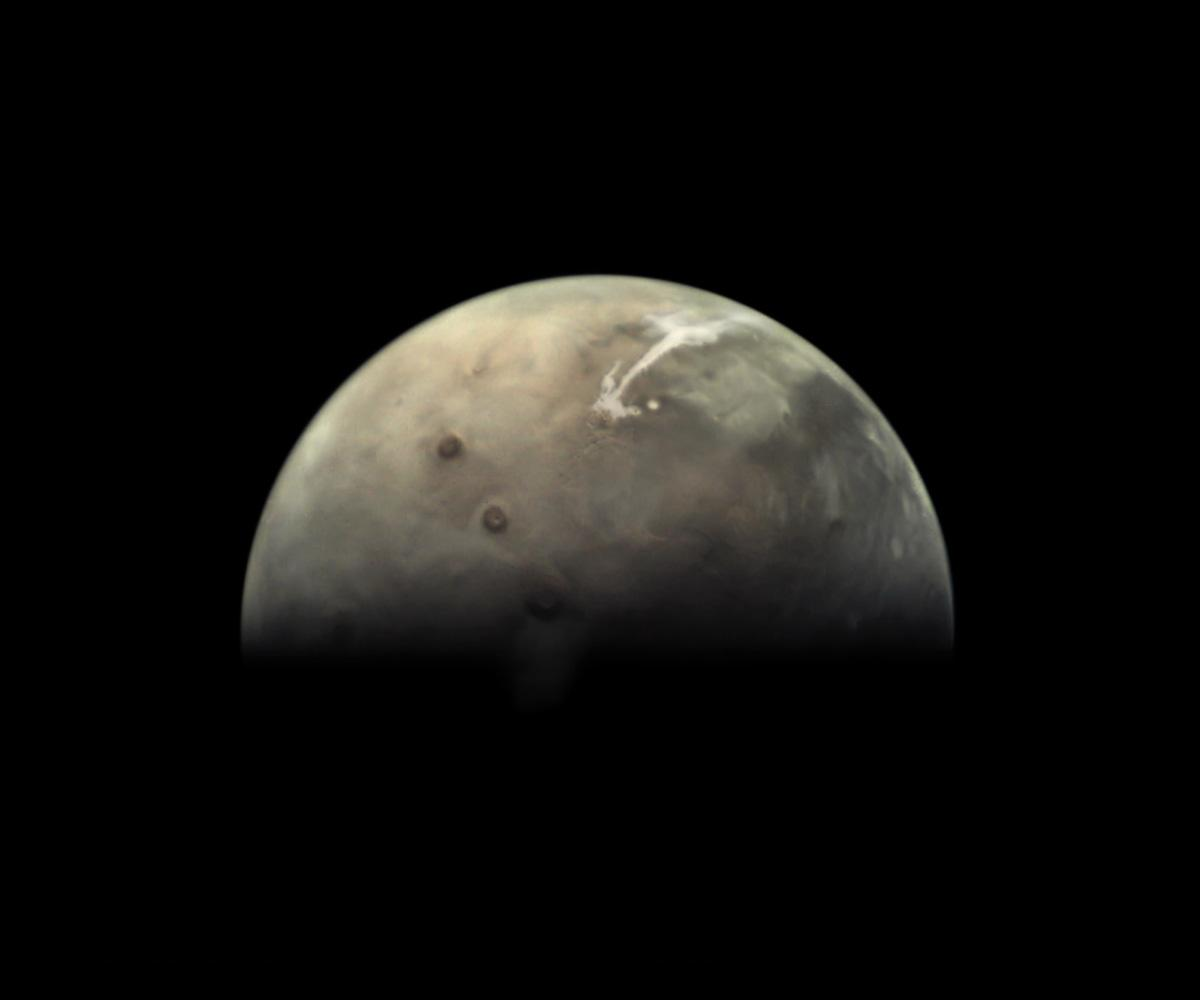
Valles Marineris on Mars in haze

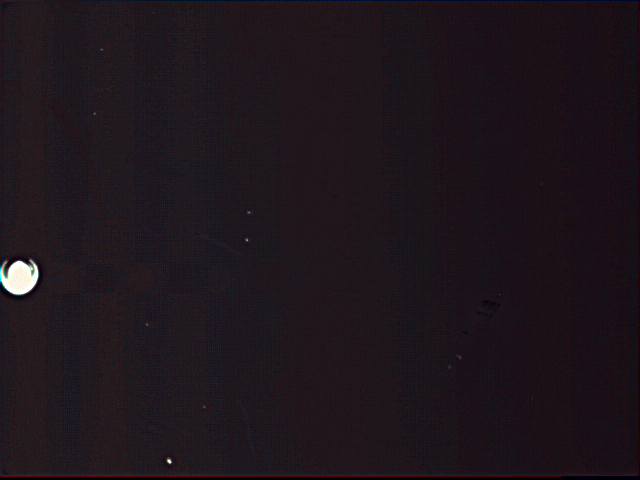
Beagle 2 separation

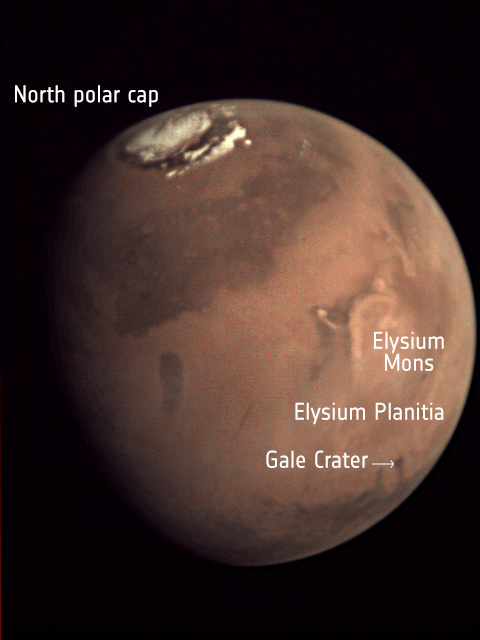
Global view of planet Mars, with Elysium Planitia, where InSight landed in 2018, and Gale crater, where Curiosity landed in 2012 noted along with the North polar cap

The Visual Monitoring Camera (VMC), also known as the Video Monitoring Camera and Mars Webcam, is a small camera mounted on Mars Express spacecraft. It is operated by the Mars Express Flight Control Team at ESOC in Darmstadt, Germany. Originally, VMC was a technical camera to monitor the separation of the Beagle 2 lander, but after a few years, it was repurposed into Mars Webcam, streaming its data to the web and even being used for science.

Starting in 2007, the VMC was used for the Mars Webcam project, where it takes global views of Mars at a high cadence and they are posted online. The VMC is a camera-on-chip design, using the IRIS-1 system. Originally used as engineering monitoring camera for the Beagle 2 lander, it has a wide 40° field of view and limited imaging controls and it has no focus mechanism. In 2016, it was used for professional science in addition to its roles as a technical monitoring camera and public outreach.

== History ==
The camera was included on the Mars Express mission with the singular goal of monitoring the deployment of the Beagle 2 lander, which occurred on 19 December 2003 at 08:31 UTC. After performing this task, the VMC remained unused, having no intended scientific purpose. In 2007, it was checked out and turned on for educational and science outreach. The Mars Webcam project was born and proved popular with the public, offering wide-angle shots of Mars on a regular basis.

The VMC was adopted as a science instrument in early 2016, in a collaboration between ESA and the University of the Basque Country's Planetary Sciences Group. This collaboration will conduct a two-year study of the images returned by VMC, which provide a global view of the planet and allow for the study of planetary phenomena, including changes in the ice caps, dust storms and cloud activity.

The European Space Agency occasionally establishes campaigns inviting people to propose targets to be imaged by the cameras, such as the event on 25–27 May 2015.

As of October 2017, more than 21,000 images had been returned. New images are published to the camera's Flickr account in a fully automated process as they are received from the spacecraft, sometimes in as little as 75 minutes from when the photograph was taken at Mars. All images produced by the VMC are released under a Creative Commons Attribution/ShareAlike license (CC BY-SA 3.0 IGO).

On June 3, 2023, to celebrate the 20th anniversary of Mars Express, a livestream of images from the camera was streamed online, which was the first livestream direct from Mars.

== Technical specifications ==
Specifications of the VMC are:

- CMOS based (IMEC IRIS-1)
- B/W + RGB filters
- Image size: 640×480 pixels
- Pixel depth: 8 bits
- Field of view: 40×31 degrees
- Approximate distance from Mars surface: 300–10,000 km (190–6,210 mi)
- Calculated (Note: tan(31°/2) * 300 km / 240 px) resolution at 300 km: 0.347 km/pixel (0.216 mi/px)
- Calculated (Note: tan(31°/2) * 10000 km / 240 px) resolution at 10,000 km: 11.5 km/pixel (7.1 mi/px)
- Mass: 430 g (0.95 lb)
- Size: 65 × 60 × 108 mm (2.6 × 2.4 × 4.3 in)

== Observation targets ==
Noted observations:

- Beagle 2
- Mars
  - 2018 Martian dust storm

== See also ==
- JunoCam (another Education/Public outreach space camera on a space probe)
