= High Resolution Stereo Camera =

High Resolution Stereo Camera (HRSC) is a camera experiment on Mars Express. A version for Earth called HRSC-AX was also developed, as was a version for Mars 96. It has four main parts: camera head, super resolution channel, instrument frame, and digital unit. At an altitude of 250 km from Mars, SRC can produce images with a resolution of 2.3 meters/pixel of 2.35 km square Mars terrain. It has 9 channels and can produce digital terrain models. A typical image from HRSC of Mars has a resolution ranging from 12.5 for nadir (directly down) to 25 m/pixel for the furthest off-nadir shots, which can be up to 18.9 degrees.

By 2012, about 61.5% of the surface of Mars was mapped at a resolution of at least 20 meters per pixel by the Mars Express mission using this camera. Another area of study is repeat imaging, to allow the study of dynamic processes on Mars. Another trick is to make short videos of the Mars surface by taking advantage of the pushbroom nature of the detector. Each section is slightly offset for a different color, but when combined, every view is used to make a short animation.

By the start of 2015, about 70% of Mars had been imaged at resolutions greater than 20 m per pixel, and 97% at resolutions of least 60 m per pixel.

== Example observation ==
Orcus Patera, imaged by the HRSC:

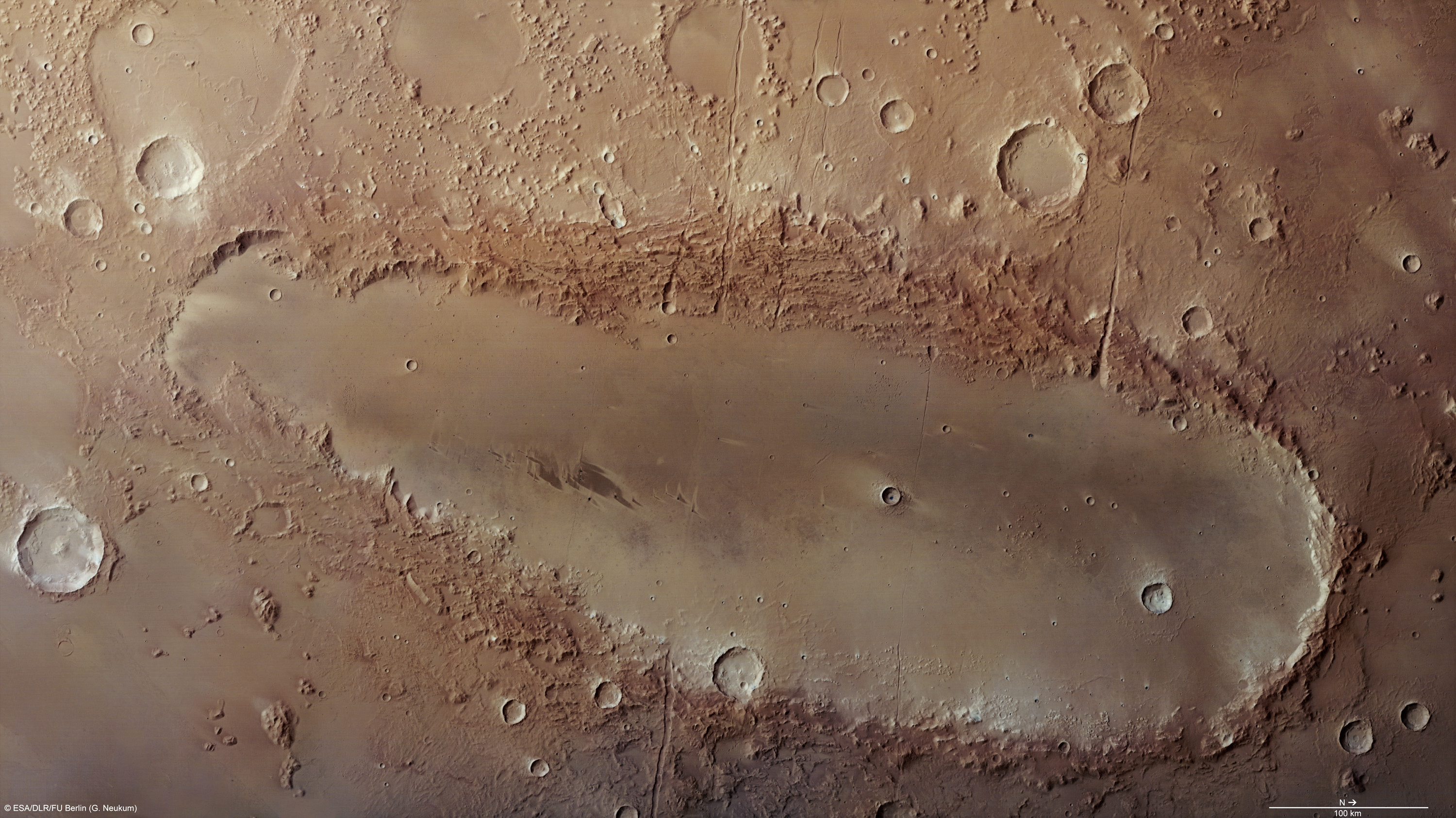
Mars Express HRSC view of Orcus Patera (Courtesy of the ESA/DLR/FU Berlin (G. Neukum))

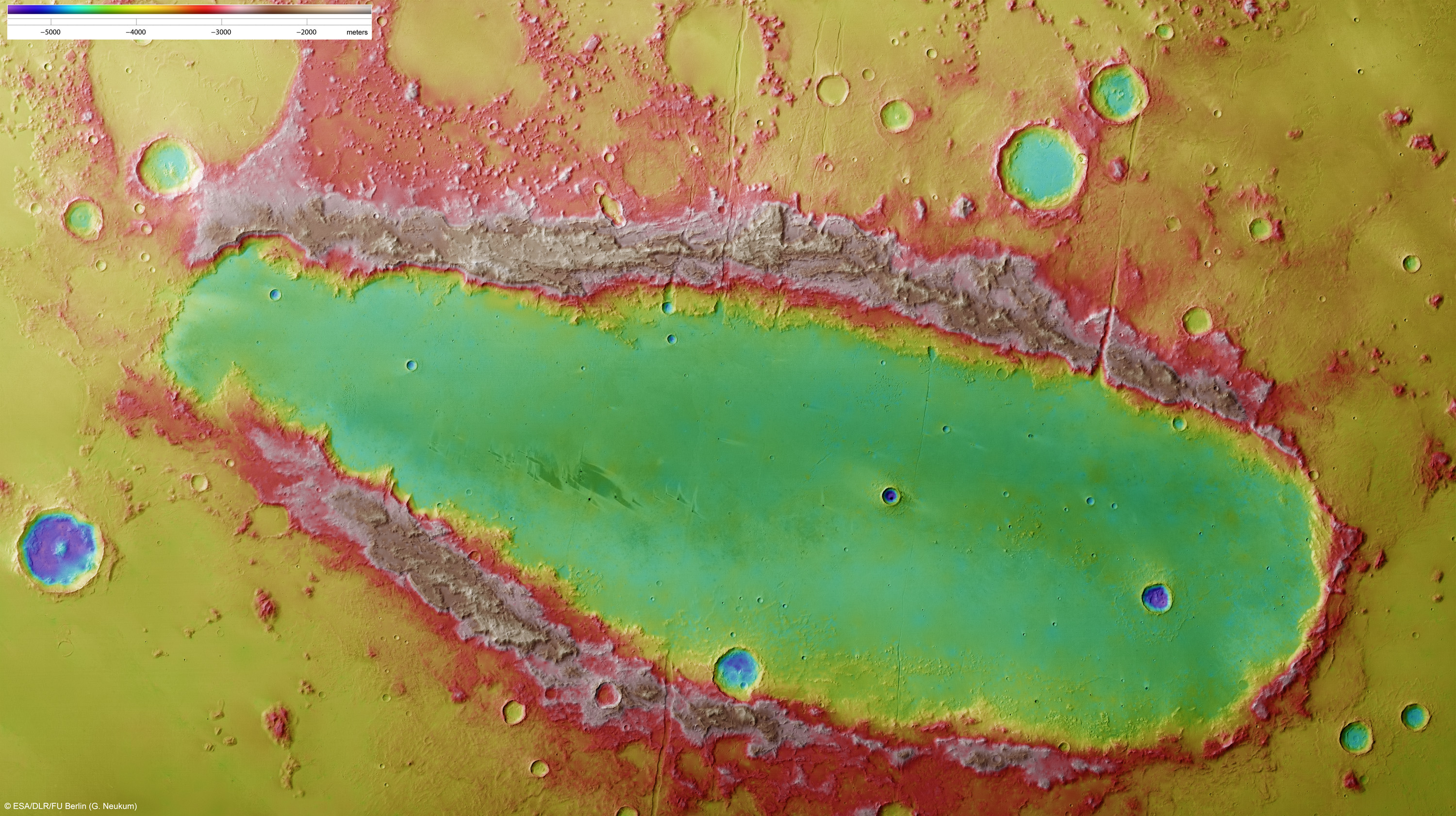
Mars Express HRSC view of Orcus Patera with colors for elevation (Courtesy of the ESA/DLR/FU Berlin (G. Neukum))

== See also ==
- Trace Gas Orbiter (next ESA Mars orbiter, arrived 2016)
