= Aurora on Mars =

Auroras located on Mars

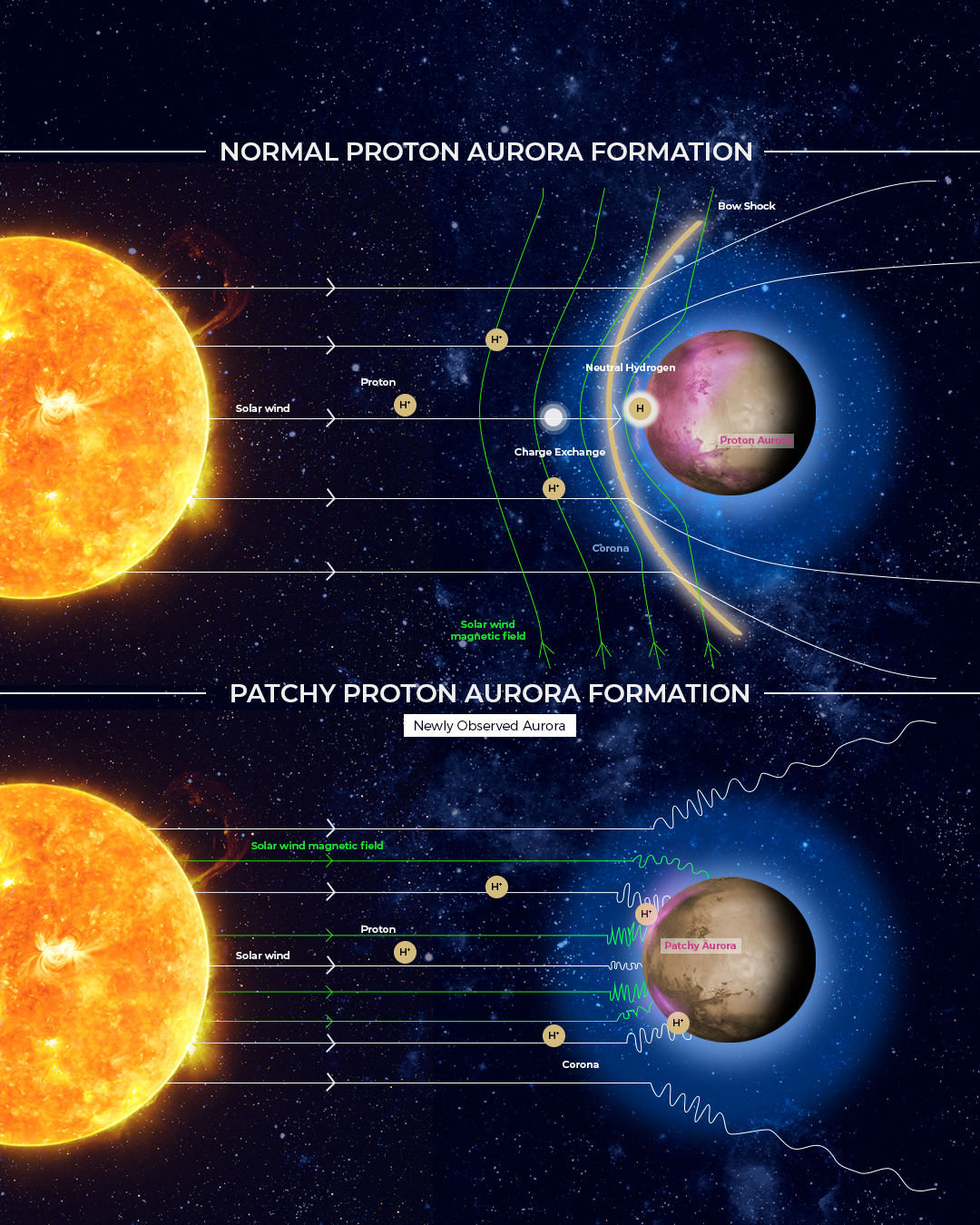
The top image shows the formation mechanism of a normal proton aurora while the bottom image shows the formation mechanism of a patchy aurora.

Auroras have been found on Mars but they are very different from the high-altitude auroras found on Earth. They occur in the upper atmosphere of Mars and are diffuse and often localized. Ever since their discovery, it has been an area of active research. Mars lacks a substantial magnetic field (see: magnetic field of Mars) due to its small size and faster cooling, instead its crustal magnetic field (parts of the Martian magnetic field trapped in the planets crust) is distributed throughout the planet. Its interaction with the surrounding plasma environment (specifically with electrons and protons) leads to a number of complex processes. This results in several types of auroras that are uncommon here on Earth. Auroras found on Mars occur in the upper atmosphere during the night and are very diffuse. They are mostly found having ultraviolet emissions although some visible emission auroras do occur.

== History of observation ==
On 11 August 2004, the European Space Agency's Mars Express found an ultraviolet glow coming from "magnetic umbrellas" in the Southern Hemisphere. Mars does not have a global magnetic field which guides charged particles entering the atmosphere. Mars has multiple umbrella-shaped magnetic fields mainly in the Southern Hemisphere, which are remnants of a global field that decayed billions of years ago.

In late December 2014, NASA's MAVEN spacecraft detected evidence of widespread auroras in Mars' northern hemisphere, from about 20°–30°N latitude. The particles causing the aurora penetrated into the Martian atmosphere, creating auroras below 100 km above the surface, Earth's auroras range from 100 km to 500 km above the surface. Magnetic fields in the solar wind drape over Mars, into the atmosphere, and the charged particles follow the solar wind magnetic field lines into the atmosphere, causing auroras to occur outside the magnetic umbrellas.

On 18 March 2015, NASA reported the detection of an aurora that is not fully understood and an unexplained dust cloud in the Martian atmosphere.

In September 2017, NASA reported that radiation levels on the Martian surface were temporarily doubled, and were associated with an aurora 25 times brighter than any observed earlier, due to a massive, unexpected solar storm in the middle of the month.

In March 2022, a possible explanation of the auroras observed on Mars was reported.

In 2025, the Perseverance rover had detected a green visible-wavelength aurora on Mars and scientists presented a method for predicting the aurora, which they developed using data from Mars Express, MAVEN, and Perseverance.
