= Mars Express =

European orbiter mission to Mars (2003–present)

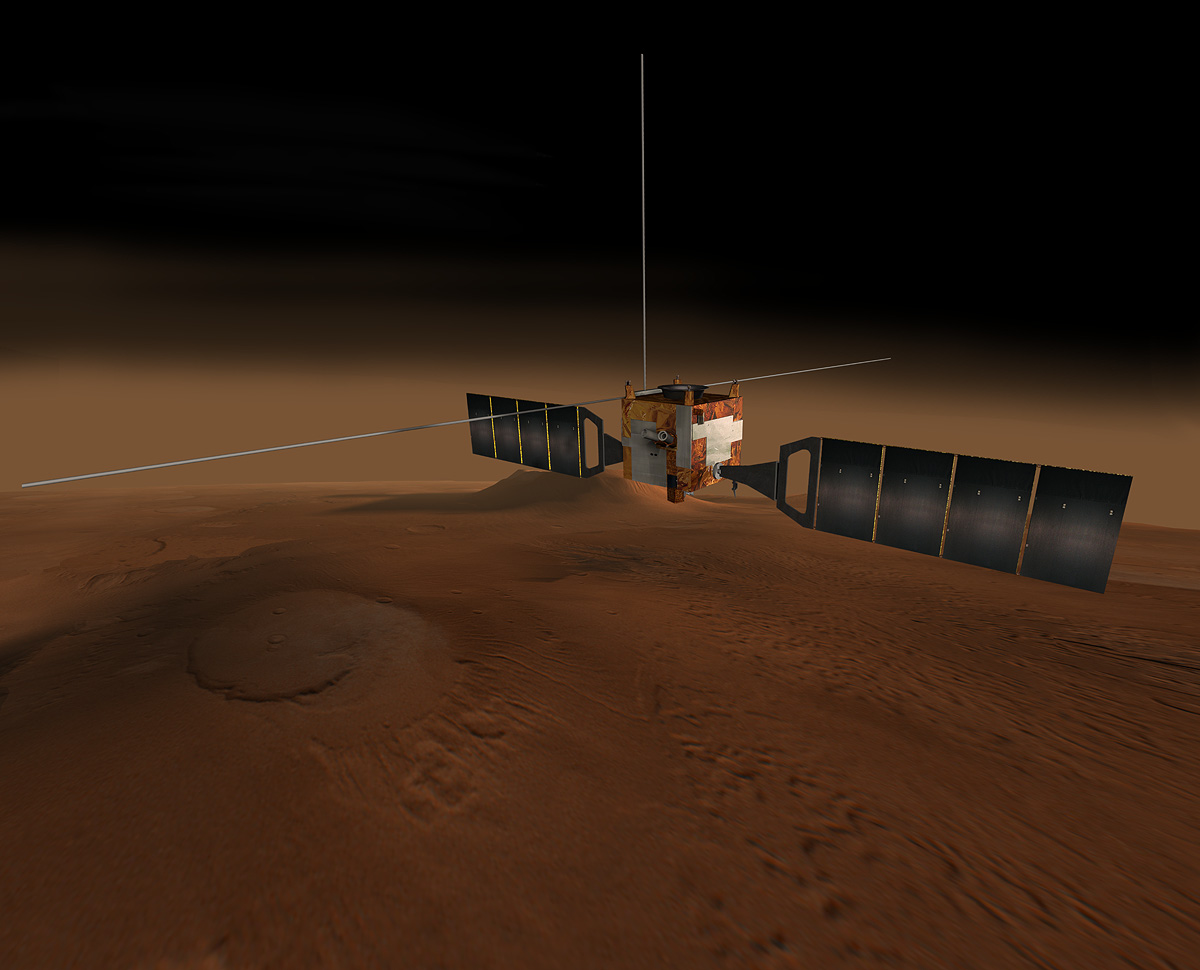
- CG image of Mars Express arriving at Mars
- Mission type: Mars orbiter
- Operator: ESA
- COSPAR ID: 2003-022A
- SATCAT no.: 27816
- Website: exploration.esa.int/mars
- Mission duration: Elapsed: 23 years, 5 months and 13 days since launch; 22 years, 10 months and 21 days at Mars

Spacecraft properties
- Launch mass: 1,123 kg
- Dry mass: 666 kg (1,468 lb)
- Power: 460 watts

Start of mission
- Launch date: June 2, 2003, 17:45 UTC
- Rocket: Soyuz-FG/Fregat
- Launch site: Baikonur 31/6
- Contractor: Starsem

Orbital parameters
- Reference system: Areocentric
- Eccentricity: 0.571
- Periareion altitude: 298 km (185 mi)
- Apoareion altitude: 10,107 km (6,280 mi)
- Inclination: 86.3 degrees
- Period: 7.5 hours

Mars orbiter
- Spacecraft component: Mars Express
- Orbital insertion: December 25, 2003, 03:00 UTC; MSD 46206 08:27 AMT

Mars lander
- Spacecraft component: Beagle 2
- Landing date: December 25, 2003, 02:54 UTC
Instruments
- HRSC: High Resolution Stereo Camera
- OMEGA: Visible and Infrared Mineralogical, Mapping Spectrometer
- MARSIS: Sub-surface Sounding Radar Altimeter
- PFS: Planetary Fourier Spectrometer
- SPICAM: Ultraviolet and Infrared Atmospheric Spectrometer
- ASPERA: Energetic Neutral Atoms Analyser
- MaRS: Mars Radio Science Experiment
- VMC: Visual Monitoring Camera
- ESA insignia (2020s)

Mars Express is a space exploration mission by the European Space Agency (ESA) exploring the planet Mars and its moons since 2003, and the first planetary mission attempted by ESA.

Mars Express consisted of two parts, the Mars Express Orbiter and Beagle 2, a lander designed to perform exobiology and geochemistry research. Although the lander failed to fully deploy after it landed on the Martian surface, the orbiter has been successfully performing scientific measurements since early 2004, namely, high-resolution imaging and mineralogical mapping of the surface, radar sounding of the subsurface structure down to the permafrost, precise determination of the atmospheric circulation and composition, and study of the interaction of the atmosphere with the interplanetary medium.

Due to the valuable science return and the highly flexible mission profile, Mars Express has been granted several mission extensions. The latest was approved on March 7, 2023, consisting of a confirmed operating period until December 31, 2026, and a further provisional extension to December 31, 2028. Arriving at Mars in 2003, 22 years, 10 months and 21 days ago (and counting), it is the second longest surviving, continually active spacecraft in orbit around a planet other than Earth, behind only NASA's still active 2001 Mars Odyssey. It has acted as a central satellite communications node in Mars orbit, conducting radio occultation experiments with the joint ESA and Roscosmos Trace Gas Orbiter, communicating with China's Zhurong rover, and is planned to communicate with Japan's Martian Moons eXploration Phobos sample return.

== Name ==
"Express" in the name originally referred to the speed and efficiency with which the spacecraft was designed and built. However, "Express" also describes the spacecraft's relatively short interplanetary voyage, a result of being launched when the orbits of Earth and Mars brought them closer than they had been in about 60,000 years.

== Background ==
The Mars Express mission is dedicated to the study of the interior, subsurface, surface, atmosphere, and environment of the planet Mars. The spacecraft carried seven scientific instruments, a small lander, a lander relay, and a Visual Monitoring Camera, all designed to contribute to solving the mystery of Mars's missing water.

Some of the instruments on the orbiter, including the camera systems and some spectrometers, reuse designs from the failed launch of the Russian Mars 96 mission in 1996 (European countries had provided much of the instrumentation and financing for that unsuccessful mission). The scientific objectives of the Mars Express represent an attempt to fulfill in part the lost scientific goals of this failed Russian mission, complemented by exobiology research with Beagle-2.

The design of Mars Express is based on ESA's Rosetta mission, on which a considerable sum was spent on development. The same design was also used for ESA's Venus Express mission in order to increase reliability and reduce development cost and time.

The total initial Mars Express budget excluding the lander was €150 million. The prime contractor for the construction of Mars Express orbiter was EADS Astrium Satellites.

== Orbiter and subsystems ==
=== Structure ===
The Mars Express orbiter is a cube-shaped spacecraft with two solar panel wings extending from opposite sides. The launch mass of 1223 kg includes a main bus with 113 kg of payload, the 60 kg lander, and 457 kg of propellant. The main body is 1.5 m × 1.8 m × 1.4 m in size, with an aluminium honeycomb structure covered by an aluminium skin. The solar panels measure about 12 m tip-to-tip. Two 20 m long wire dipole antennas extend from opposite side faces perpendicular to the solar panels as part of the radar sounder.

=== Propulsion ===
The Soyuz/Fregat launcher provided most of the thrust Mars Express needed to reach Mars. The final stage of the Soyuz, Fregat was jettisoned once the probe was safely on a course for Mars. The spacecraft's on-board means of propulsion was used to slow the probe for Mars orbit insertion and subsequently for orbit corrections.

The body is built around the main propulsion system, which consists of a bipropellant 400 N main engine. The two 267-liter propellant tanks have a total capacity of 595 kg. Approximately 370 kg are needed for the nominal mission. Pressurized helium from a 35-liter tank is used to force fuel into the engine. Trajectory corrections will be made using a set of eight 10 N thrusters, one attached to each corner of the spacecraft bus. The spacecraft configuration is optimized for a Soyuz/Fregat, and was fully compatible with a Delta II launch vehicle.

=== Power ===
Spacecraft power is provided by the solar panels which contain 11.42 square meters of silicon cells. The originally planned power was to be 660 W at 1.5 AU but a faulty connection has reduced the amount of power available by 30%, to about 460 W. This loss of power does not significantly affect the science return of the mission. Power is stored in three lithium-ion batteries with a total capacity of 64.8 Ah for use during eclipses. The power is fully regulated at 28 V, and the Terma power module (also used in Rosetta) is redundant. During routine phase, the spacecraft's power consumption is in the range of 450–550 W.

=== Attitude control - avionics ===
Attitude control (3-axis stabilization) is achieved using two 3-axis inertial measurement units, a set of two star cameras and two Sun sensors, gyroscopes, accelerometers, and four 12 N·m·s reaction wheels. Pointing accuracy is 0.04 degree with respect to the inertial reference frame and 0.8 degree with respect to the Mars orbital frame. Three on-board systems help Mars Express maintain a very precise pointing accuracy, which is essential to allow the spacecraft to use some of the science instruments.

=== Communications ===
The communications subsystem is composed of three antennas: A 1.6 m diameter parabolic dish high-gain antenna and two omnidirectional antennas. The first one provide links (telecommands uplink and telemetry downlink) in both X-band (8.4 GHz) and S-band (2.1 GHz) and is used during nominal science phase around Mars. The low gain antennas are used during launch and early operations to Mars and for eventual contingencies once in orbit. Two Mars lander relay UHF antennas are mounted on the top face for communication with the Beagle 2 or other landers, using a Melacom transceiver.

==== Earth stations ====
Although communications with Earth were originally scheduled to take place with the ESA 35-meter wide Ground Station in New Norcia (Australia) New Norcia Station, the mission profile of progressive enhancement and science return flexibility have triggered the use of the ESA ESTRACK Ground Stations in Cebreros Station, Madrid, Spain and Malargüe Station, Argentina. In addition, further agreements with NASA Deep Space Network have made possible the use of American stations for nominal mission planning, thus increasing complexity but with a clear positive impact in scientific returns. This inter-agency cooperation has proven effective, flexible and enriching for both sides. On the technical side, it has been made possible (among other reasons) thanks to the adoption of both Agencies of the Standards for Space Communications defined in CCSDS.

=== Thermal ===
Thermal control is maintained through the use of radiators, multi-layer insulation, and actively controlled heaters. The spacecraft must provide a benign environment for the instruments and on-board equipment. Two instruments, PFS and OMEGA, have infrared detectors that need to be kept at very low temperatures (about −180 °C). The sensors on the camera (HRSC) also need to be kept cool. But the rest of the instruments and on-board equipment function best at room temperatures (10–20 °C).

The spacecraft is covered in gold-plated aluminium-tin alloy thermal blankets to maintain a temperature of 10–20 °C inside the spacecraft. The instruments that operate at low temperatures to be kept cold are thermally insulated from this relatively high internal temperature, and emit excess heat into space using attached radiators.

=== Control unit and data storage ===
The spacecraft is run by two Control and Data management Units with 12 gigabits of solid state mass memory for storage of data and housekeeping information for transmission. The on-board computers control all aspects of the spacecraft functioning including switching instruments on and off, assessing the spacecraft orientation in space and issuing commands to change it.

Another key aspect of the Mars Express mission is its artificial intelligence tool (MEXAR2). The primary purpose of the AI tool is the scheduling of when to download various parts of the collected scientific data back to Earth, a process which used to take ground controllers a significant amount of time. The new AI tool saves operator time, optimizes bandwidth use on the DSN, prevents data loss, and allows better use of the DSN for other space operations as well. The AI decides how to manage the spacecraft's 12 gigabits of storage memory, when the DSN will be available and not be in use by another mission, how to make the best use of the DSN bandwidth allocated to it, and when the spacecraft will be oriented properly to transmit back to Earth.

== Lander ==
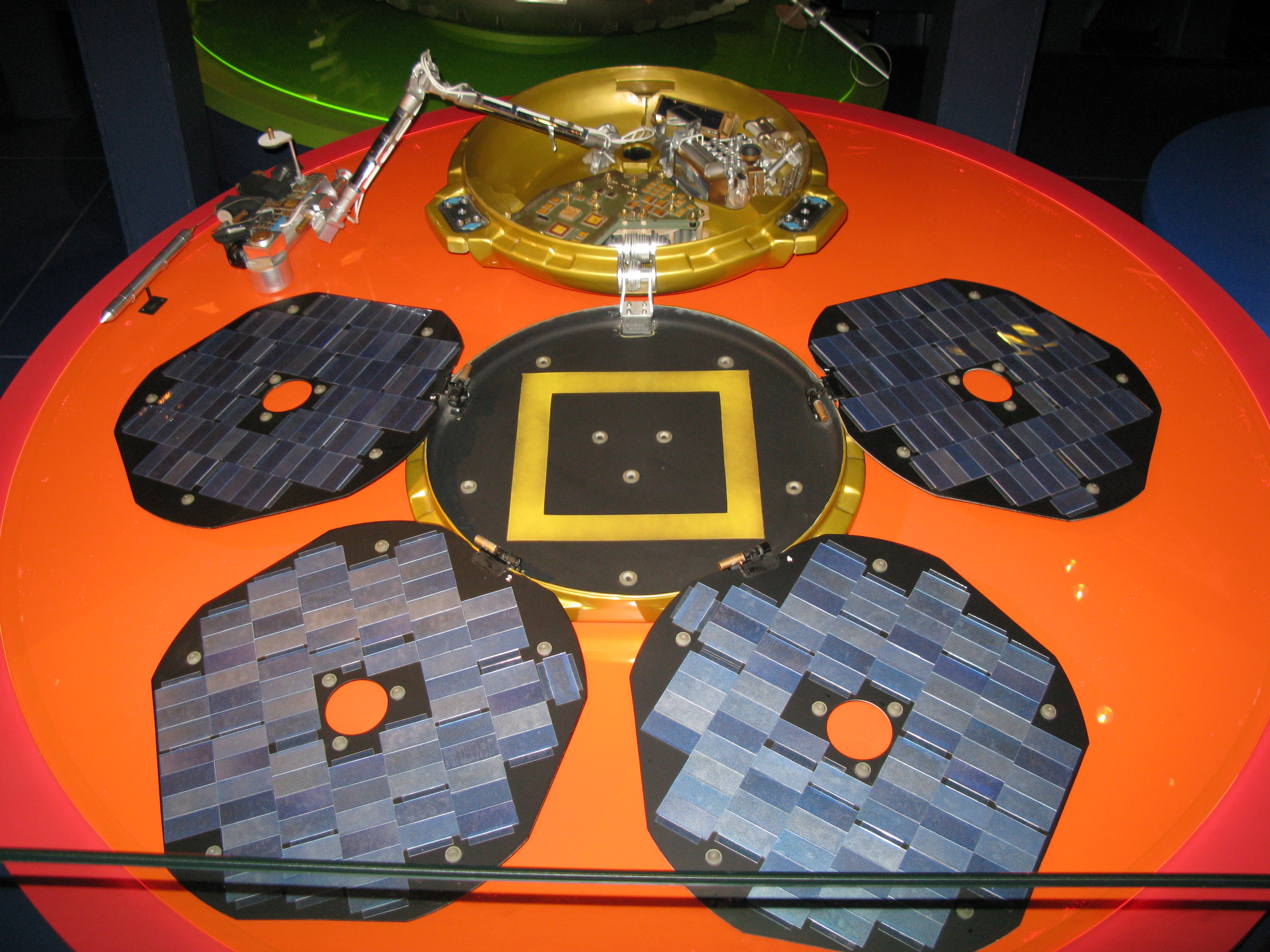
A replica of the Beagle 2 lander component of Mars Express at the Science Museum, London

The Beagle 2 lander objectives were to characterize the landing site geology, mineralogy, and geochemistry, the physical properties of the atmosphere and surface layers, collect data on Martian meteorology and climatology, and search for possible signatures of life on Mars. However, the landing attempt was unsuccessful and the lander was declared lost.

A Commission of Inquiry on Beagle 2 identified several possible causes, including airbag problems, severe shocks to the lander's electronics which had not been simulated adequately before launch, and problems with parts of the landing system colliding; but was unable to reach any firm conclusions.

The spacecraft's fate remained a mystery until it was announced in January 2015 that NASA's Mars Reconnaissance Orbiter, using HiRISE, had found the probe intact on the surface of Mars. It was then determined that one of the spacecraft's four solar panels may have only partially opened, possibly blocking the spacecraft's communications. Beagle 2 was the first British and first European probe to achieve a landing on Mars.

== Scientific instruments ==
The scientific objectives of the Mars Express payload are to obtain global high-resolution photo-geology (10 m resolution), mineralogical mapping (100 m resolution) and mapping of the atmospheric composition, study the subsurface structure, the global atmospheric circulation, and the interaction between the atmosphere and the subsurface, and the atmosphere and the interplanetary medium. The total mass budgeted for the science payload is 116 kg. The payload scientific instruments are:

- Visible and Infrared Mineralogical Mapping Spectrometer (OMEGA) (Observatoire pour la Minéralogie, l'Eau, les Glaces et l'Activité) – France – Determines mineral composition of the surface up to 100 m resolution. Is mounted inside pointing out the top face. Instrument mass: 28.6 kg
- Ultraviolet and Infrared Atmospheric Spectrometer (SPICAM) – France – Assesses elemental composition of the atmosphere. Is mounted inside pointing out the top face. Instrument mass: 4.7 kg
- Mars Advanced Sounding Radar Altimeter (MARSIS) – Italy – A radar altimeter used to assess composition of sub-surface aimed at search for frozen water. Is mounted in the body and is nadir pointing, and also incorporates the two 20 m antennas. Instrument mass: 13.7 kg
- Planetary Fourier Spectrometer (PFS) – Italy – Makes observations of atmospheric temperature and pressure (observations suspended in September 2005). Is mounted inside pointing out the top face and is currently working. Instrument mass: 30.8 kg
- Analyzer of Space Plasmas and Energetic Atoms (ASPERA) – Sweden – Investigates interactions between upper atmosphere and solar wind. Is mounted on the top face. Instrument mass: 7.9 kg
- High Resolution Stereo Camera (HRSC) – Germany – Produces color images with up to 2 m resolution. Is mounted inside the spacecraft body, aimed through the top face of the spacecraft, which is nadir pointing during Mars operations. Instrument mass: 20.4 kg
- Mars Express Lander Communications (MELACOM) – UK – Allows Mars Express to act as a communication relay for landers on the Martian surface. (Has been used on both Mars Exploration Rovers, and was used to support the landing of NASA's Phoenix mission)
- Mars Radio Science Experiment (MaRS) – Uses radio signals to investigate atmosphere, surface, subsurface, gravity and solar corona density during solar conjunctions. It uses the communications subsystem itself.
- Visual Monitoring Camera, a small camera to monitor the lander ejection.

== Operations of the spacecraft ==
Operations for Mars Express are carried out by a multinational team of engineers from ESA's Operation Centre (ESOC) in Darmstadt. The team began preparations for the mission about 3 to 4 years prior to the actual launch. This involved preparing the ground segment and the operational procedures for the whole mission.

The Mission Control Team is composed of the Flight Control Team, Flight Dynamics Team, Ground Operations Managers, Software Support and Ground Facilities Engineers. All of these are located at ESOC but there are additionally external teams, such as the Project and Industry Support teams, who designed and built the spacecraft. The Flight Control Team currently consists of:

- The Spacecraft Operations Manager
- Six Operations Engineers (including three Mission Planners)
- One Spacecraft Analyst
- Six spacecraft controllers (SpaCons), shared with ExoMars Trace Gas Orbiter, BepiColombo, and Solar Orbiter.

The team build-up, headed by the Spacecraft Operations Manager, started about four years before launch. He was required to recruit a suitable team of engineers that could handle the varying tasks involved in the mission. For Mars Express the engineers came from various other missions. Most of them had been involved with Earth orbiting satellites.

== Mission timeline ==
=== Mission preparation ===
In the years preceding the launch of a spacecraft numerous teams of experts distributed over the contributing companies and organisations prepared the space and ground segments. Each of these teams focussed on the area of its responsibility and interfacing as required. A major additional requirement raised for the Launch and Early Orbit Phase (LEOP) and all critical operational phases was that it was not enough merely to interface; the teams had to be integrated into one Mission Control Team. All the different experts had to work together in an operational environment and the interaction and interfaces between all elements of the system (software, hardware and human) had to run smoothly for this to happen:

- the flight operations procedures had to be written and validated down to the smallest detail
- the control system had to be validated
- system Validation Tests (SVTs) with the satellite had to be performed to demonstrate the correct interfacing of the ground and space segments
- mission Readiness Test with the Ground Stations had to be performed
- a Simulations Campaign was run

=== Launch ===
Animation of Mars Express's trajectory around Sun Mars Express · Sun · Earth · Mars

The spacecraft was launched on June 2, 2003, at 23:45 local time (17:45 UT, 1:45 p.m. EDT) from Baikonur Cosmodrome in Kazakhstan, using a Soyuz-FG/Fregat rocket. The Mars Express and Fregat booster were initially put into a 200 km Earth parking orbit, then the Fregat was fired again at 19:14 UT to put the spacecraft into a Mars transfer orbit. The Fregat and Mars Express separated at approximately 19:17 UT. The solar panels were then deployed and a trajectory correction manoeuvre was performed on June 4 to aim Mars Express towards Mars and allow the Fregat booster to coast into interplanetary space. The Mars Express was the first Russian-launched probe to successfully make it out of low Earth orbit since the Soviet Union fell.

=== Near Earth commissioning phase ===
The Near Earth commissioning phase extended from the separation of the spacecraft from the launcher upper stage until the completion of the initial check out of the orbiter and payload. It included the solar array deployment, the initial attitude acquisition, the declamping of the Beagle-2 spin-up mechanism, the injection error correction manoeuvre and the first commissioning of the spacecraft and payload (final commissioning of payload took place after Mars Orbit Insertion). The payload was checked out one instrument at a time. This phase lasted about one month.

=== The interplanetary cruise phase ===
This five month phase lasted from the end of the Near Earth Commissioning phase until one month prior to the Mars capture manoeuvre and included trajectory correction manoeuvres and payloads calibration. The payload was mostly switched off during the cruise phase, with the exception of some intermediate check-outs. Although it was originally meant to be a "quiet cruise" phase, It soon became obvious that this "cruise" would be indeed very busy. There were star tracker problems, a power wiring problem, extra manoeuvres, and on October 28, the spacecraft was hit by one of the largest solar flares ever recorded.

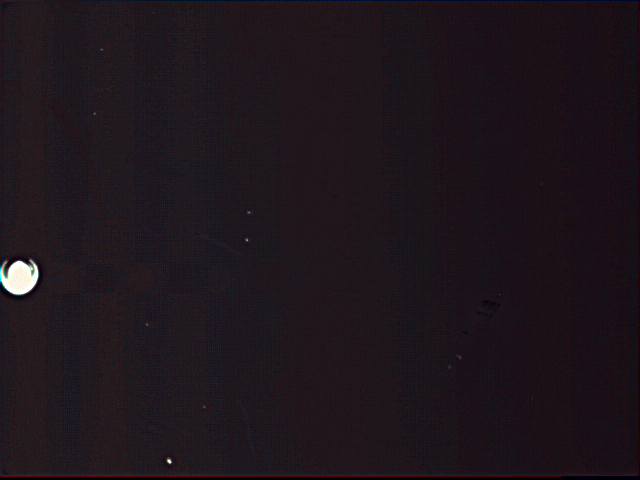
Beagle 2 after separation

=== Lander jettison ===
The Beagle 2 lander was released on December 19, 2003, at 8:31 UTC (9:31 CET) on a ballistic cruise towards the surface. It entered Mars's atmosphere on the morning of December 25. Landing was expected to occur at about 02:45 UT on December 25 (9:45 p.m. EST December 24). However, after repeated attempts to contact the lander failed using the Mars Express craft and the NASA Mars Odyssey orbiter, it was declared lost on February 6, 2004, by the Beagle 2 management board. An inquiry was held and its findings were published later that year.

=== Orbit insertion ===
Mars Express's trajectory around Mars from December 25, 2003, to January 1, 2010 Mars Express · Mars

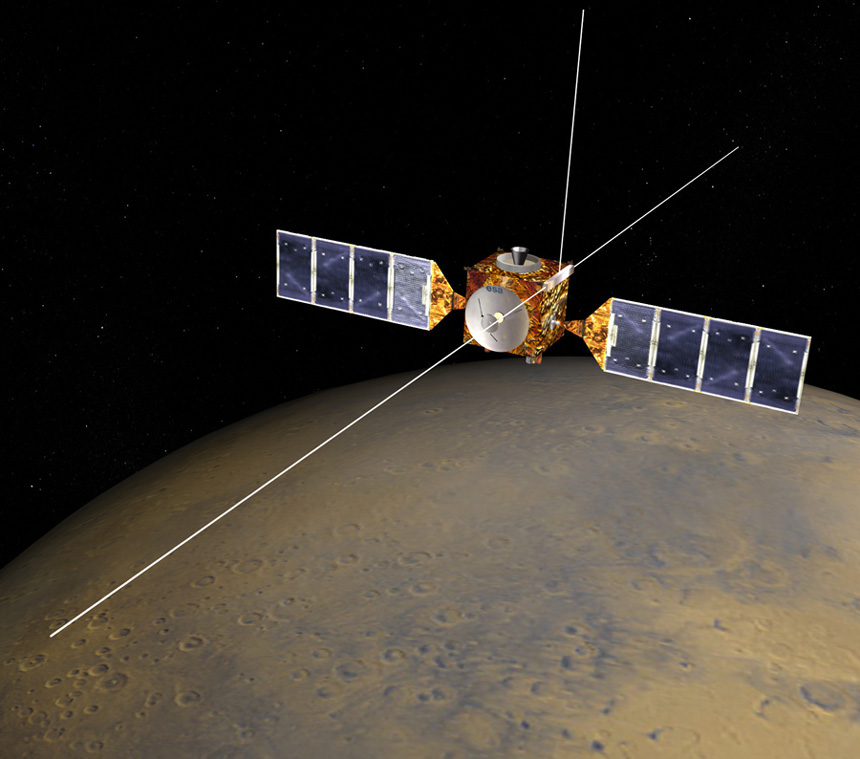
MARSIS antenna deployed

Mars Express arrived at Mars after a 400 million km journey and course corrections in September and in December 2003.

On December 20 Mars Express fired a short thruster burst to put it into position to orbit the planet. The Mars Express orbiter then fired its main engine and went into a highly elliptical initial-capture orbit of 250 km × 150,000 km with an inclination of 25 degrees on December 25 at 03:00 UT (10:00 p.m., December 24 EST).

First evaluation of the orbital insertion showed that the orbiter had reached its first milestone at Mars. The orbit was later adjusted by four more main engine firings to the desired 259 km × 11,560 km near-polar (86 degree inclination) orbit with a period of 7.5 hours. Near periapsis (nearest to Mars) the top deck is pointed down towards the Martian surface and near apoapsis (farthest from Mars in its orbit) the high gain antenna will be pointed towards Earth for uplink and downlink.

After 100 days the apoapsis was lowered to 10,107 km and periapsis raised to 298 km to give an orbital period of 6.7 hours.

The MARSIS radar booms were originally scheduled to be deployed in April 2004, but this was delayed to 2005 out of fear that the deployment could damage the spacecraft through a whiplash effect.

=== Routine phase: science return ===
Since orbit insertion Mars Express has been progressively fulfilling its original scientific goals. Nominal science observations began during July 2005. Nominally the spacecraft points to Mars while acquiring science and then slews to Earth-pointing to downlink the data, although some instruments like MARSIS or Radio Science might be operated while spacecraft is Earth-pointing.

== Timeline of notable discoveries and events ==
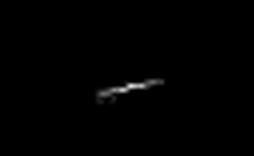
Image of Mars Express in orbit, by MGS

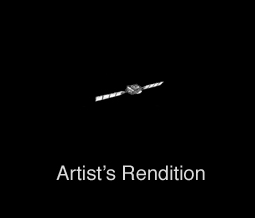
Expected appearance

For more than 20,000 orbits, Mars Express payload instruments have been nominally and regularly operated. The HRSC camera has been consistently mapping the Martian surface with unprecedented resolution and has acquired many images.

=== First decade ===
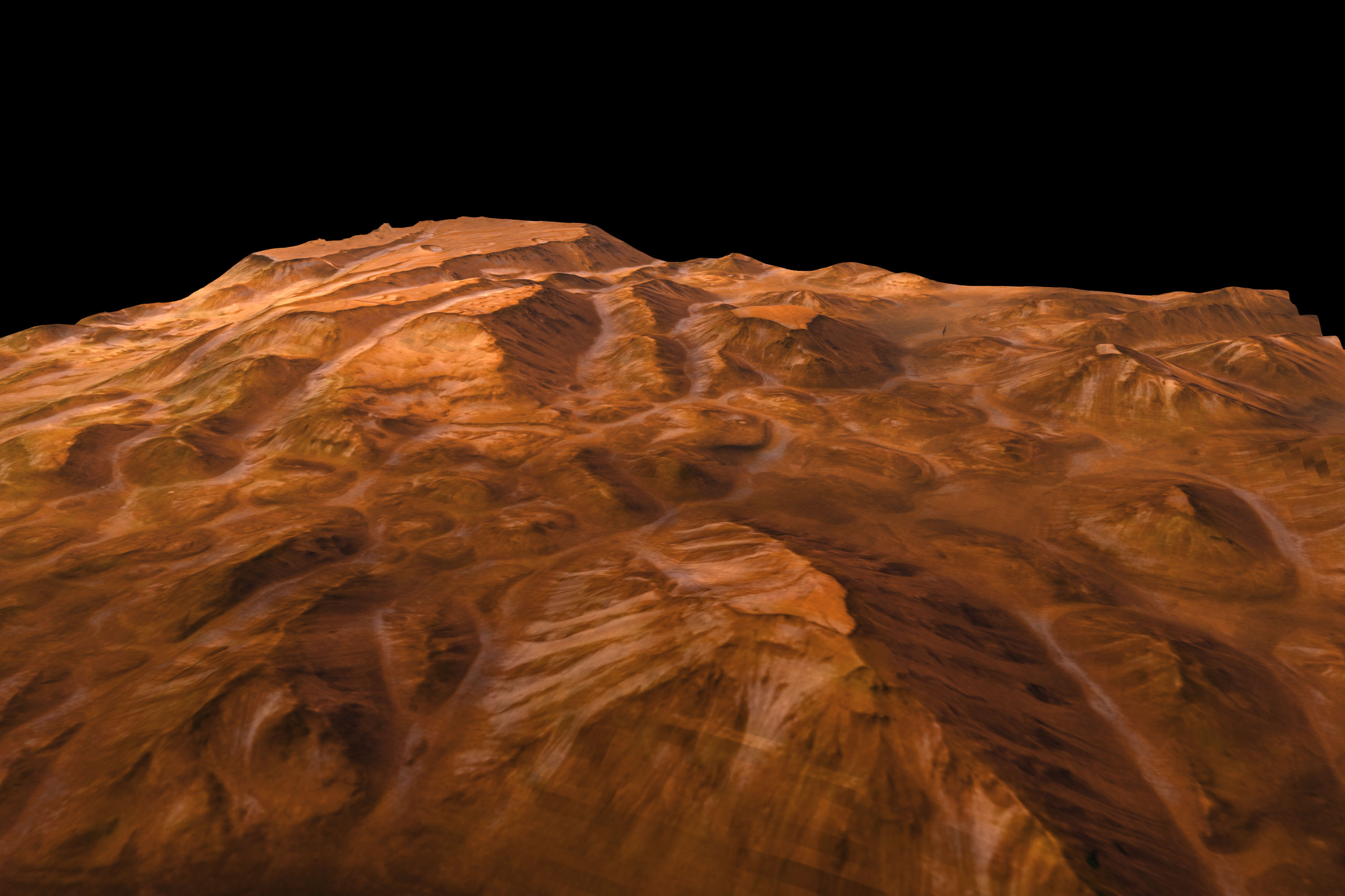
Valles Marineris, 2004

==== 2004 ====
- January 23: ESA announced the discovery of water ice in the south polar ice cap, using data collected by the OMEGA instrument.
- January 28: Mars Express orbiter reaches final science orbit altitude around Mars.
- March 17: Orbiter detects polar ice caps that contain 85% carbon dioxide (CO_{2}) ice and 15% water ice.
- March 30: A press release announces that the orbiter has detected methane in the Martian atmosphere. Although the amount is small, about 10 parts in a thousand million, it has excited scientists to question its source. Since methane is removed from the Martian atmosphere very rapidly, there must be a current source that replenishes it. Because one of the possible sources could be microbial life, it is planned to verify the reliability of these data and especially watch for difference in the concentration in various places on Mars. It is hoped that the source of this gas can be discovered by finding its location of release.
- April 28: ESA announced that the deployment of the boom carrying the radar-based MARSIS antenna was delayed. It described concerns with the motion of the boom during deployment, which can cause the spacecraft to be struck by elements of it. Further investigations are planned to make sure that this will not happen.
- July 15: Scientists working with the PFS instrument announced that they tentatively discovered the spectral features of the compound ammonia in the Martian atmosphere. Just like methane discovered earlier (see above), ammonia breaks down rapidly in Mars's atmosphere and needs to be constantly replenished. This points towards the existence of active life or geological activity; two contending phenomena whose presence so far have remained undetected.

==== 2005 ====
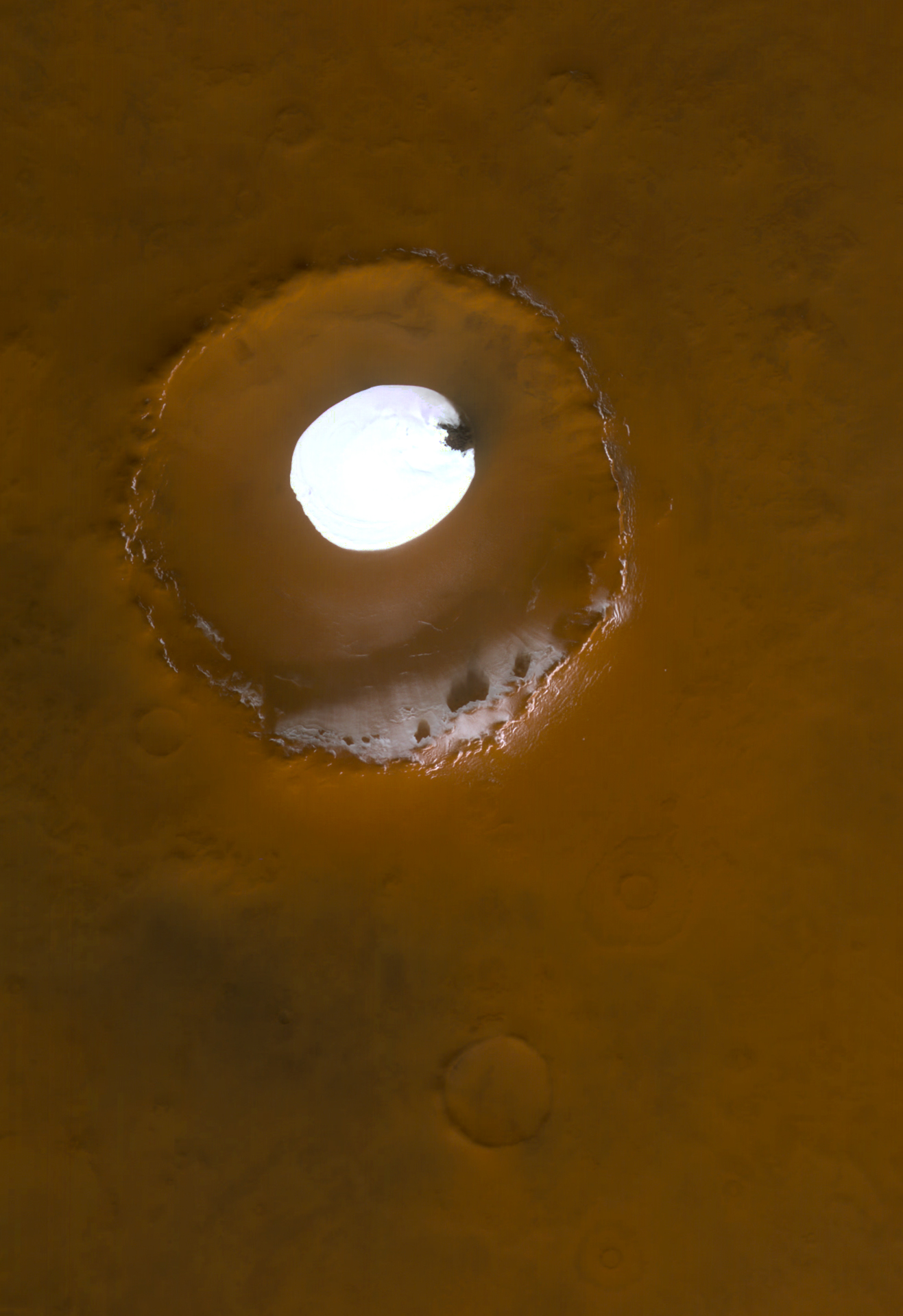
Louth crater, February 2005

- In 2005, ESA scientists reported that the OMEGA instrument data indicates the presence of hydrated sulphates, silicates and various rock-forming minerals.
- February 8: The delayed deployment of the MARSIS antenna, planned for early May 2005, has been given a green light by ESA.
- May 5: The first boom of the MARSIS antenna was successfully deployed. At first, there was no indication of any problems, but later it was discovered that one segment of the boom did not lock. The deployment of the second boom was delayed to allow for further analysis of the problem.
- May 11: Using the Sun's heat to expand the segments of the MARSIS antenna, the last segment locked in successfully.
- June 14: The second boom was deployed, and on June 16 ESA announced it was a success.
- June 22: ESA announces that MARSIS is fully operational and will soon begin acquiring data. This comes after the deployment of the third boom on June 17, and a successful transmission test on June 19.

==== 2006 ====
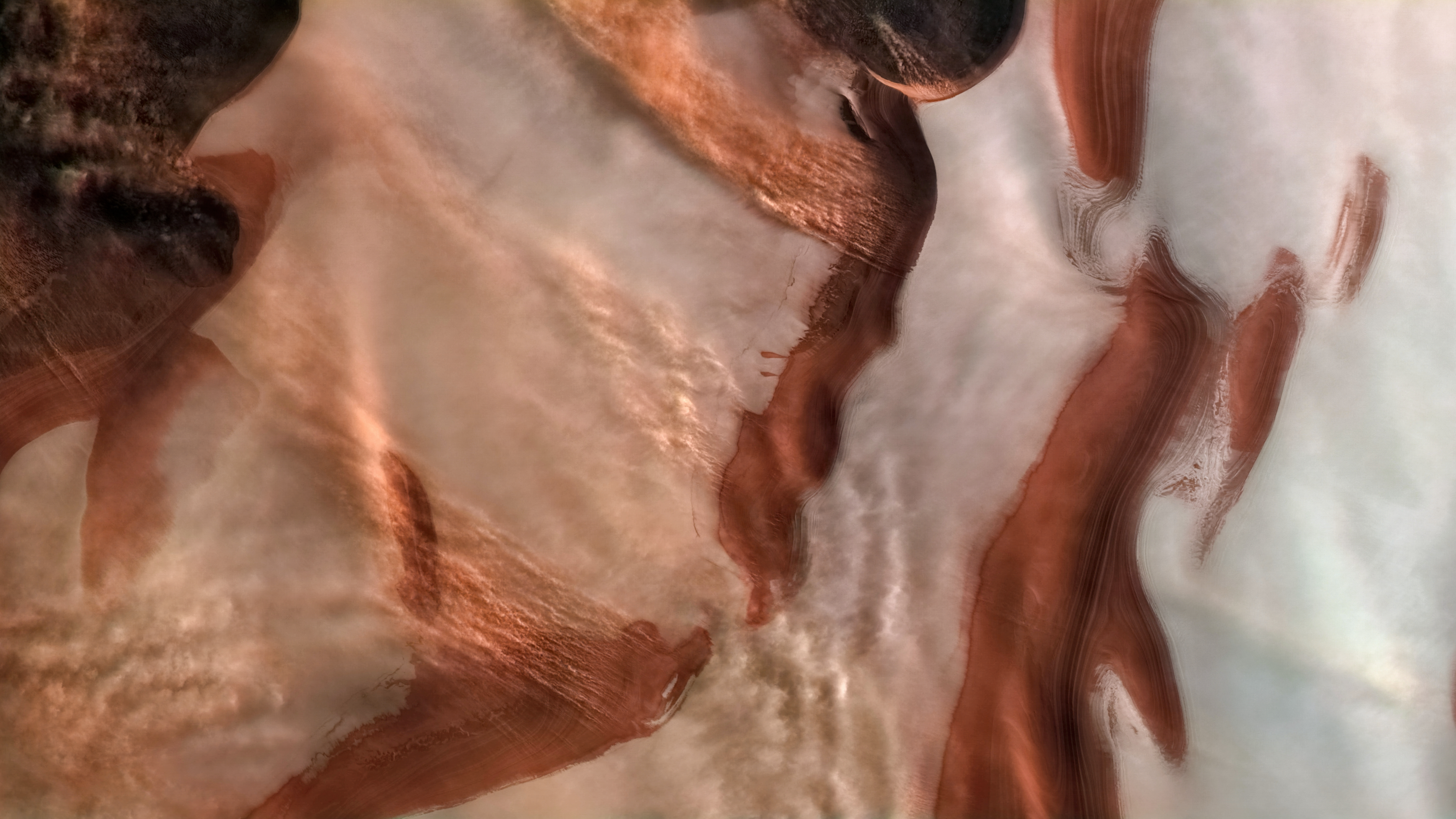
Dust Storm, North Polar Cap, processed by Andrea Luck

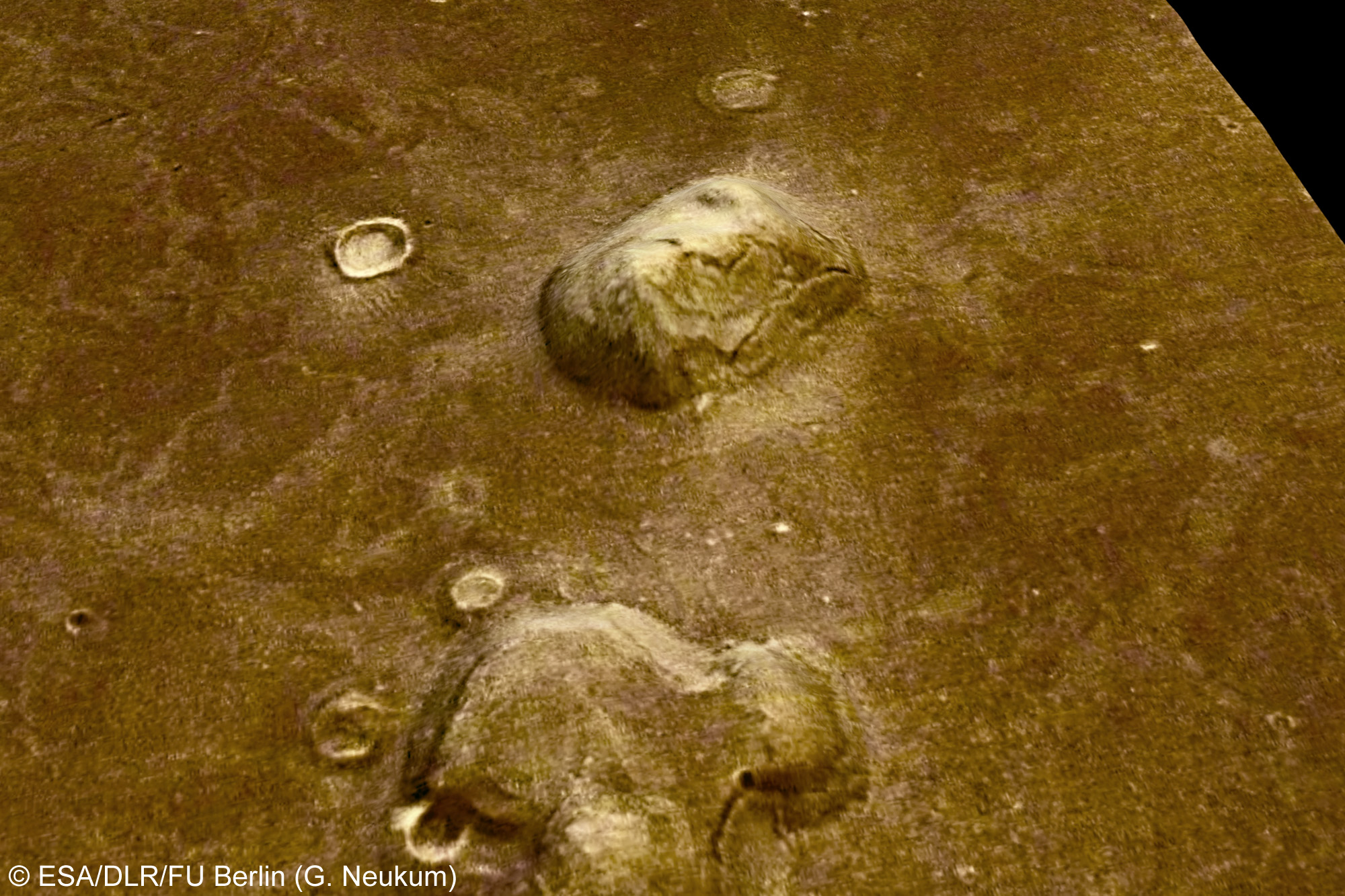
'Face on Mars' in Cydonia region, 2006

- September 21: The High Resolution Stereo Camera (HRSC) has obtained images of the Cydonia region, the location of the famous "Face on Mars". The massif became famous in a photo taken in 1976 by the American Viking 1 Orbiter. The image recorded with a ground resolution of approximately 13.7 metres per pixel.
- September 26: The Mars Express spacecraft emerged from an unusually demanding eclipse introducing a special, ultra-low-power mode nicknamed 'Sumo' – an innovative configuration aimed at saving the power necessary to ensure spacecraft survival. This mode was developed through teamwork between ESOC mission controllers, principal investigators, industry, and mission management.
- October: In October 2006 the Mars Express spacecraft encountered a superior solar conjunction (alignment of Earth-Sun-Mars-orbiter). The angle Sun-Earth-orbiter reached a minimum on October 23 at 0.39° at a distance of 2.66 AU. Operational measures were undertaken to minimize the impact of the link degradation, since the higher density of electrons in the solar plasma heavily impacts the radio frequency signal.
- December: Following the loss of NASA's Mars Global Surveyor (MGS), Mars Express team was requested to perform actions in the hopes of visually identifying the American spacecraft. Based on last ephemeris of MGS provided by JPL, the on-board high definition HRSC camera swept a region of the MGS orbit. Two attempts were made to find the craft, both unsuccessful.

==== 2007 ====
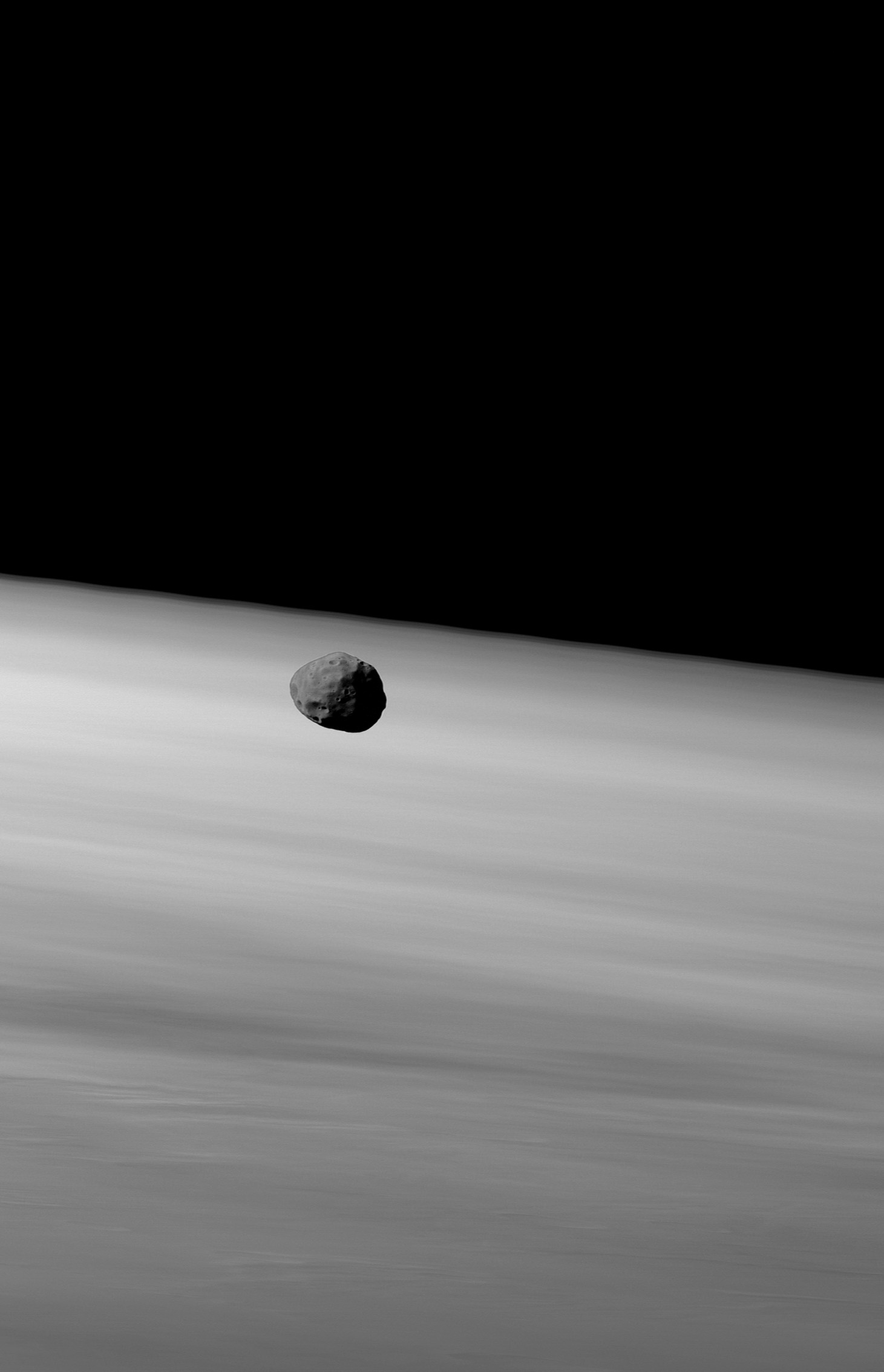
Phobos over Mars, 2007

- January: First agreements with NASA undertaken for the support by Mars Express on the landing of the American lander Phoenix in May 2008.
- February: The small camera VMC (used only once to monitor the lander ejection) was recommissioned and first steps were taken to offer students the possibility to participate in a campaign "Command Mars Express Spacecraft and take your own picture of Mars".
- February 23: As result of the science return, the Science Program Committee (SPC) granted a mission extension until May 2009.
- June 28: The High Resolution Stereo Camera (HRSC) has produced images of key tectonic features in Aeolis Mensae.

==== 2008 ====
- In March 2008, the Mars Express Team was the winner of the Sir Arthur Clarke Award for Best Team Achievement.
- During a Phobos flyby on 23 July 2008, Mars Express observed backscattering of solar wind protons at Phobos, a process previously reported at the Earth's Moon, suggesting that it is common at airless bodies covered by regolith. The next such observation occurred in January 2016.

==== 2009 ====
- February 4: The ESA's Science Programme Committee has extended the operations of Mars Express until December 31, 2009.
- October 7: ESA's Science Programme Committee has approved the extension of mission operations for Mars Express until December 31, 2012.

==== 2010 ====
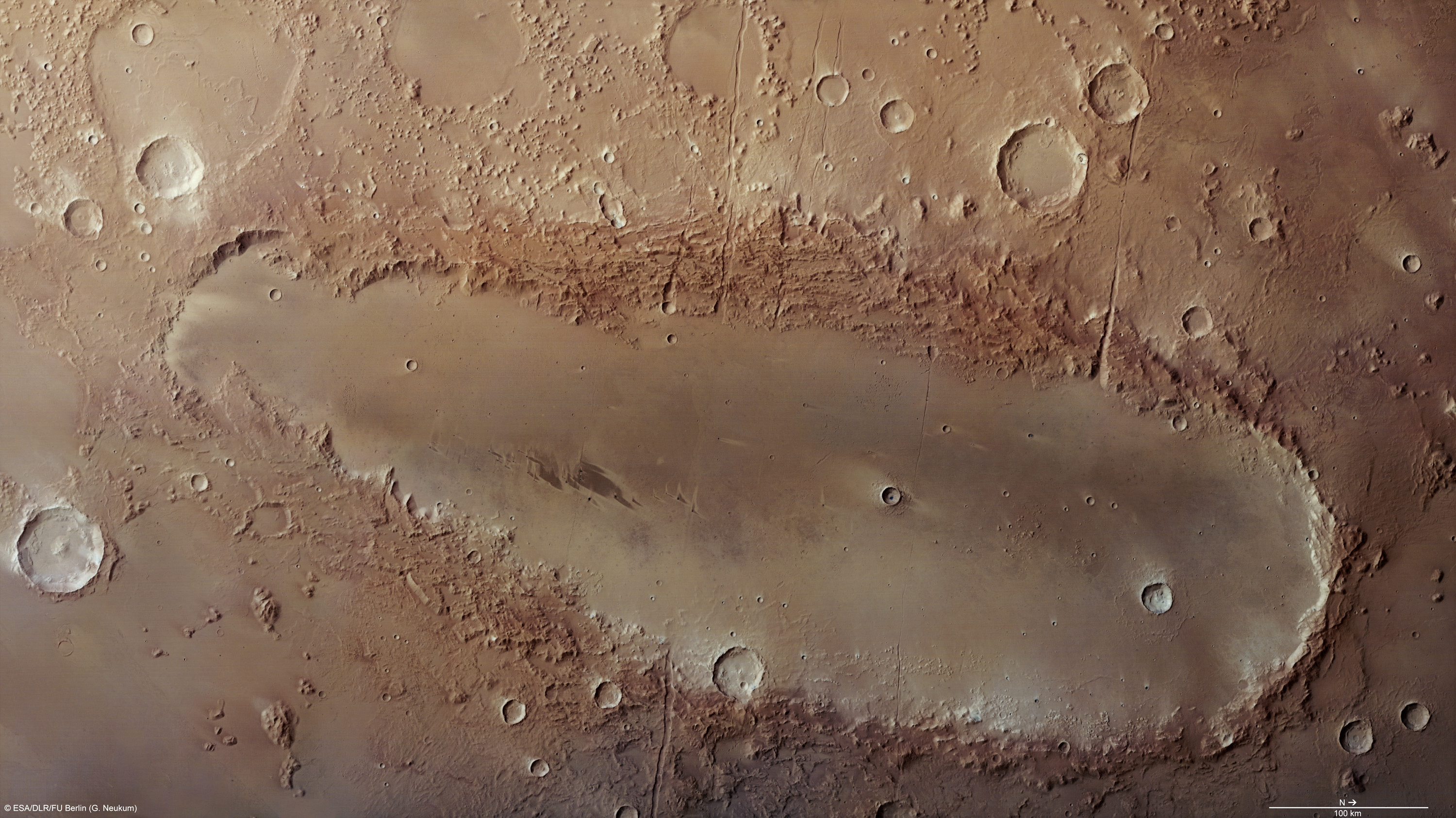
Orcus Patera by HRSC, 2010

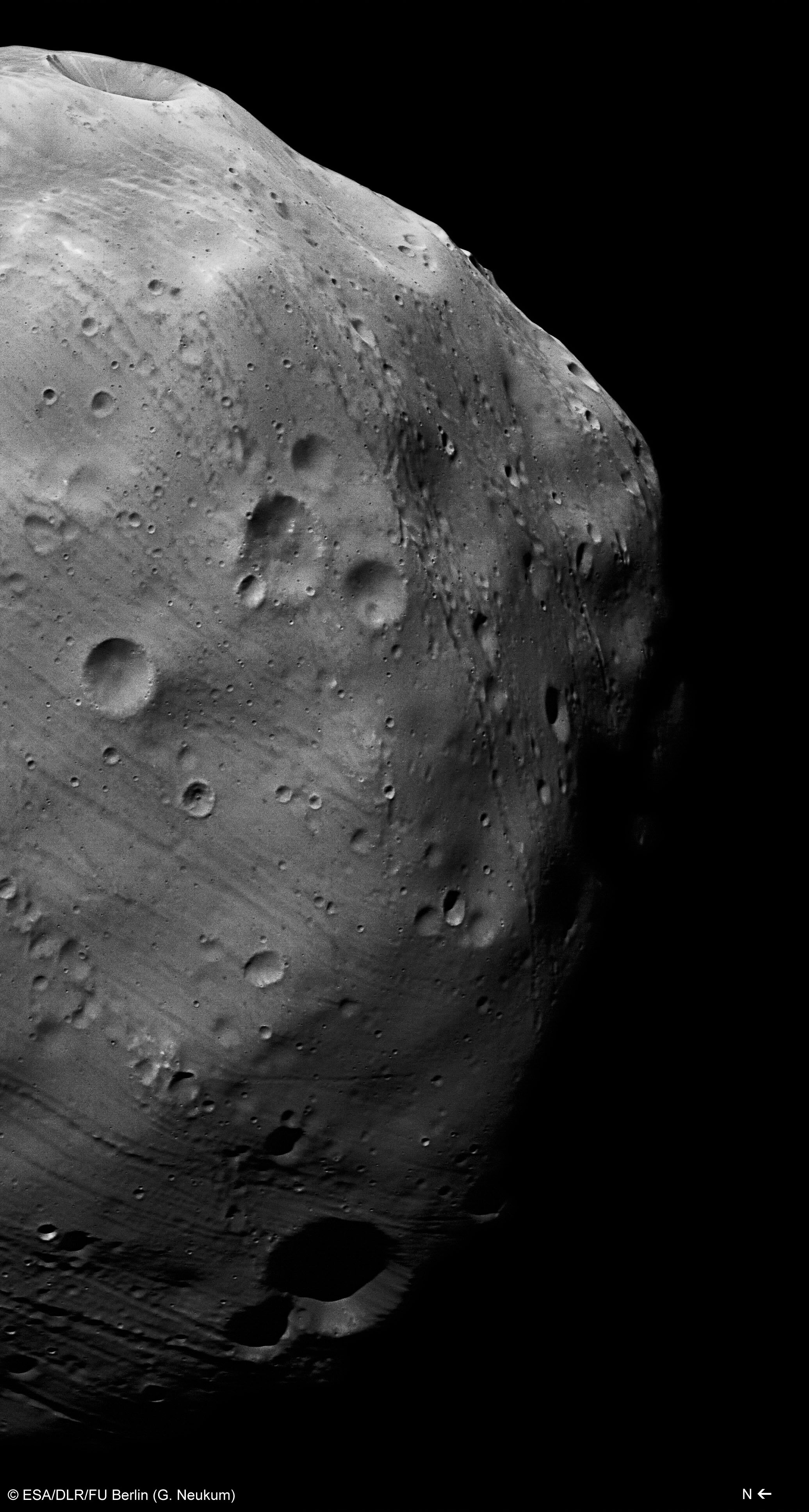
Phobos, taken on 7 March 2010

- March 5: Flyby of Phobos to measure Phobos's gravity.

==== 2011 ====
- August 13: Safe mode following a Solid-State Mass Memory problem.
- August 23: Solid-State Mass Memory problem.
- September 23: Safe mode following a Solid-State Mass Memory problem.
- October 11: Solid-State Mass Memory problem.
- October 16: Safe mode following a Solid-State Mass Memory problem.
- November 24: Science operations are resumed using the Short Mission Timeline and Command Files instead of the Long Time Line resident on the suspect Solid-State Mass Memory.

==== 2012 ====
- February 16: Resumes full science operations. There is still enough fuel for up to 14 additional years of operation.
- In March 2012, a paper was published in JGR Planets documenting the first detection of a faint infrared glow above the winter poles of Mars. This discovery was based on Mars Express's OMEGA observations from 2004, 2005, and 2006.
- July: Solar corona studied with radio waves.
- August 5/6: Assisted US probes Mars Odyssey and Mars Reconnaissance Orbiter in data collection and transfer on the Mars Science Laboratory landing.

==== 2013 ====
- Mars Express produced a near-complete topographical map of Mars's surface.
- On 29 December, Mars Express performed the closest flyby to date of Phobos.

=== Second decade ===
==== 2014 ====
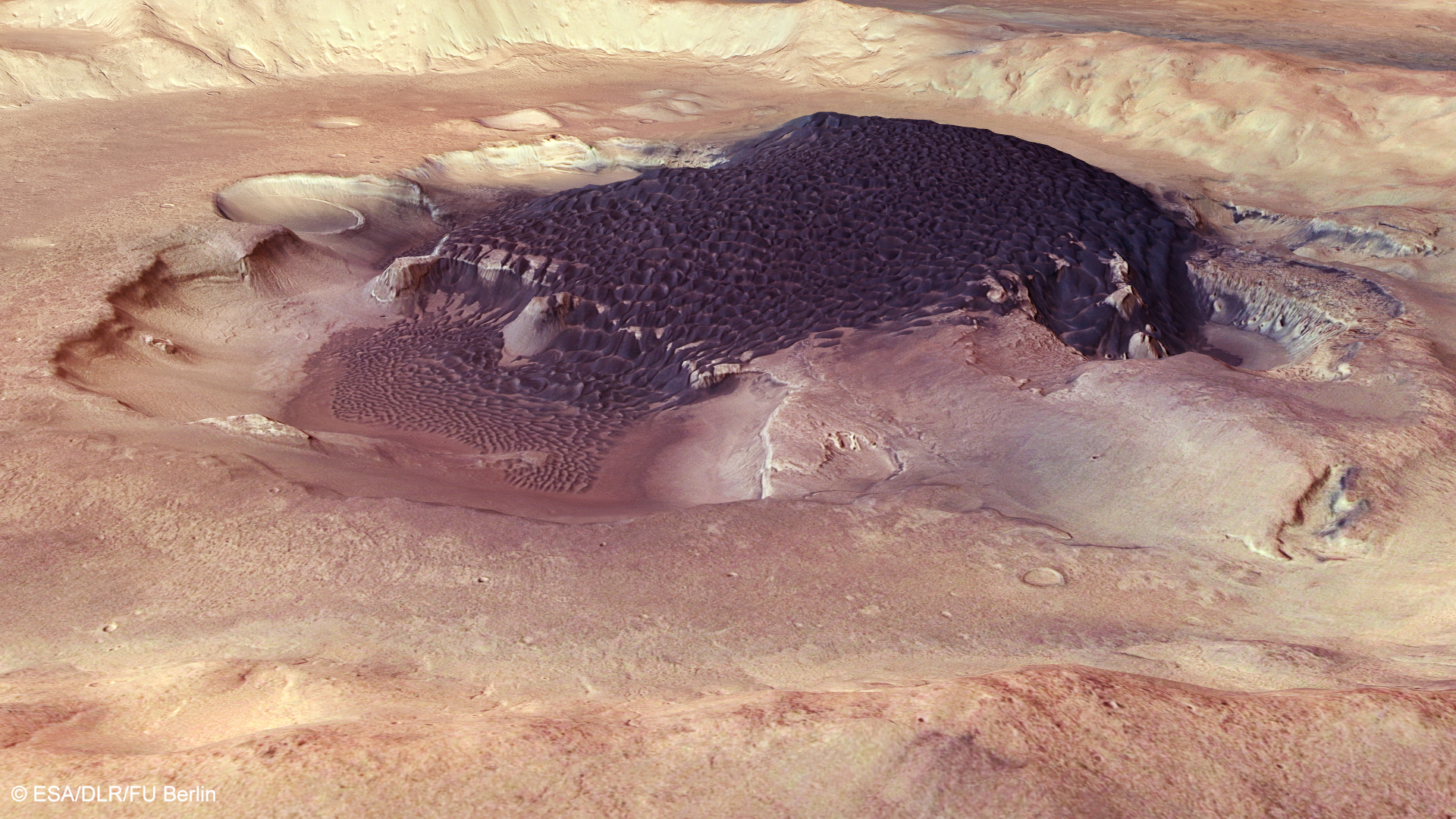
Rabe crater, 2014

- In October 2014, ESA reported Mars Express was healthy after the Comet Siding Spring flyby of Mars on 19 October — as were all NASA Mars orbiters and ISRO's orbiter, the Mars Orbiter Mission.

==== 2015 ====
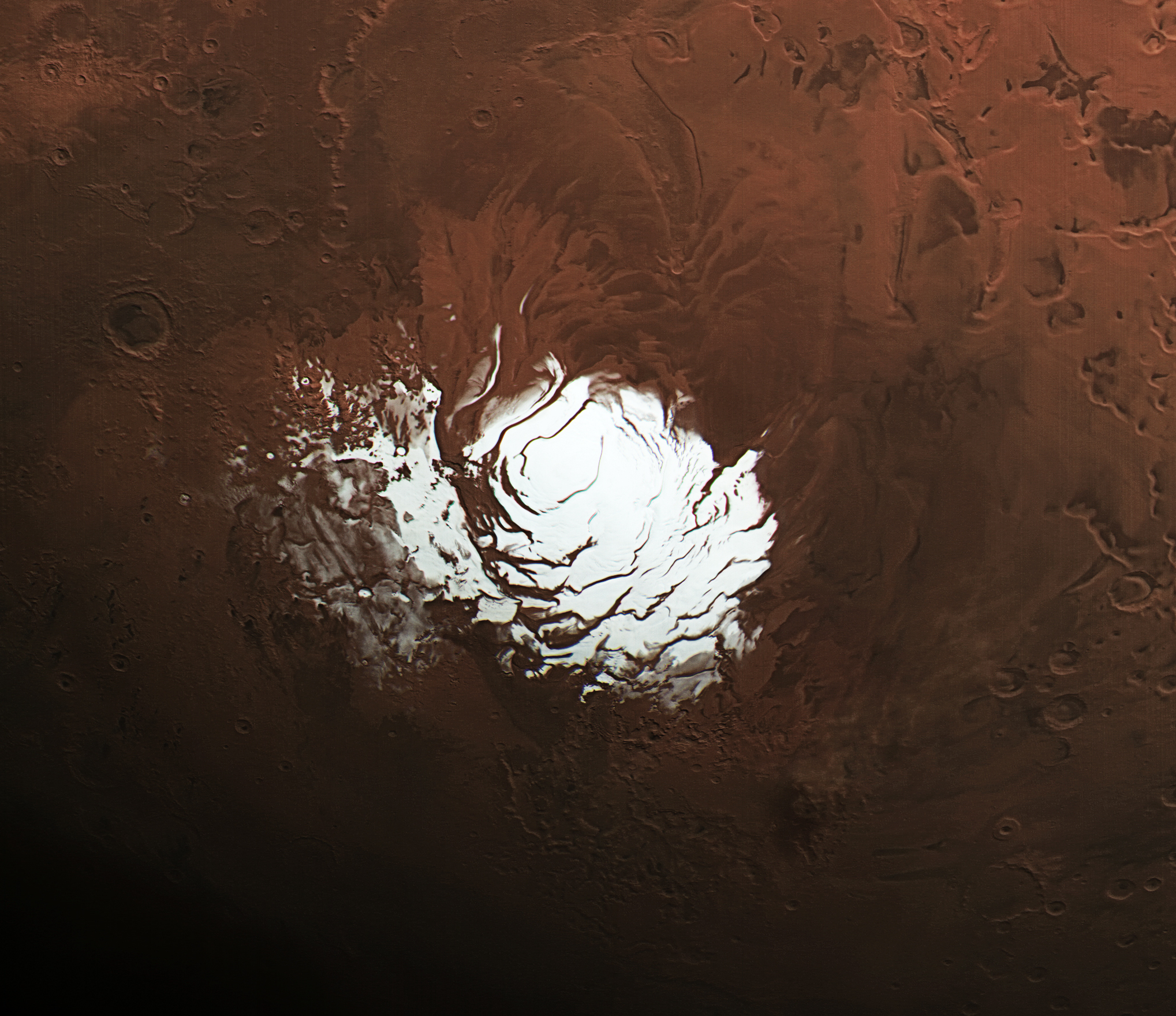
- South pole of Mars, 2015
  January: Beagle 2 found by Mars Reconnaissance Orbiter.

==== 2016 ====
- During a Phobos flyby in January 2016, Mars Express again observed solar wind proton backscattering from the moon's surface. This was only second such observation by the spacecraft (first occurred in 2008) and, as of 2025, this intermittency remains unexplained.
- October 19: Assisted with data collection and transfer for the Schiaparelli EDM lander landing.

==== 2017 ====
- On 19 June, the spacecraft took a notable image spanning from the North Pole up to Alba Mons and even farther south. The image was released in December 20, 2017, and was captured by HRSC.

==== 2018 ====
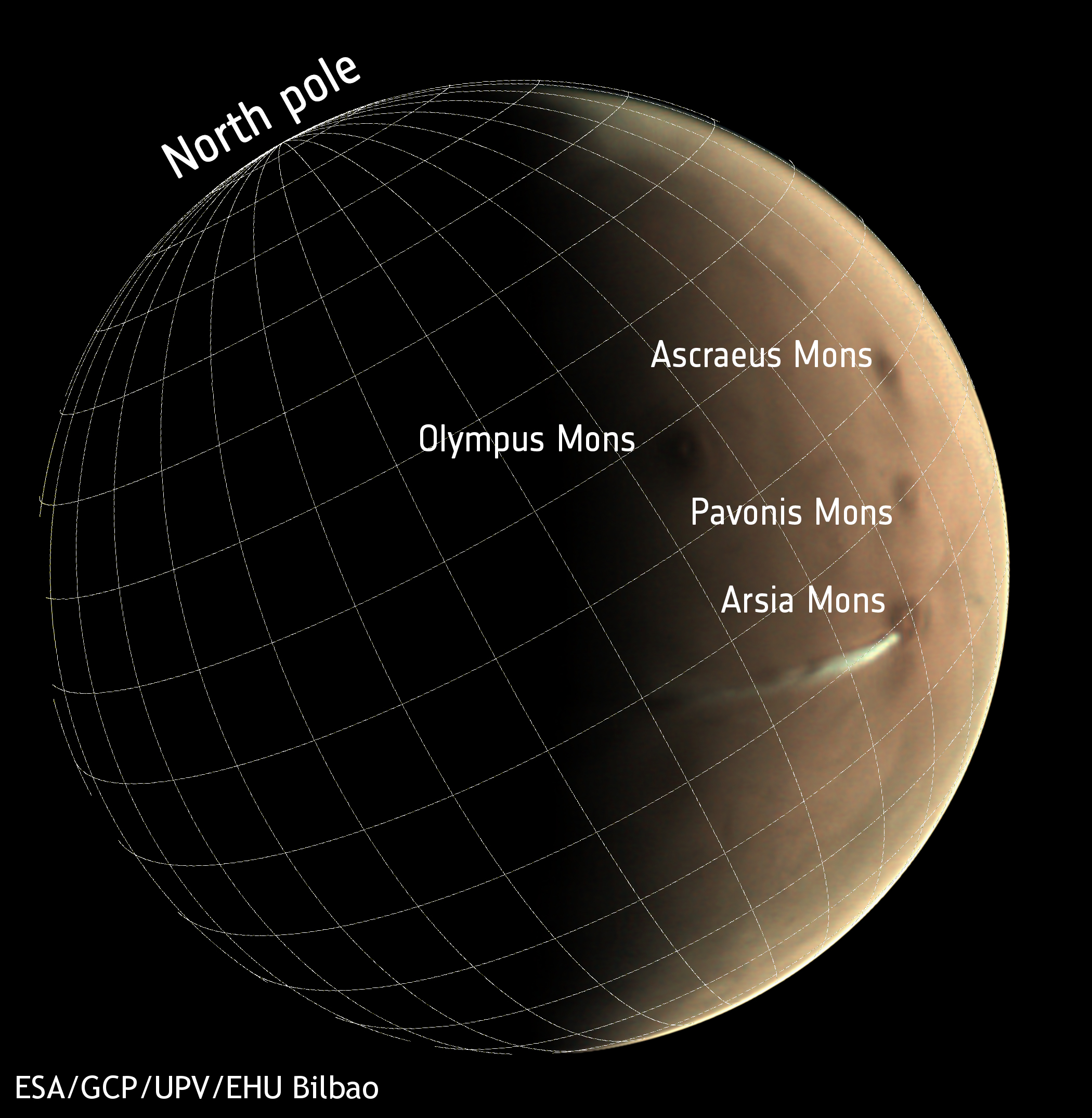
Elongated cloud on Mars, 2018

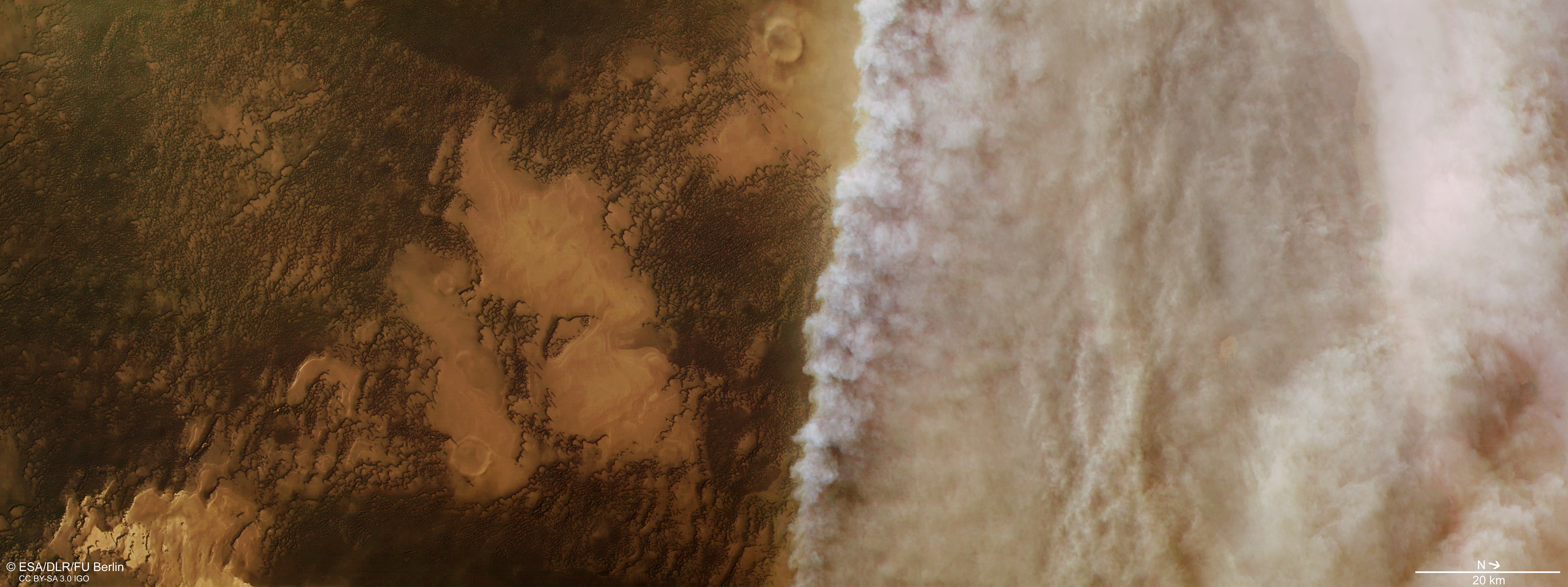
Mars dust storm, 2018

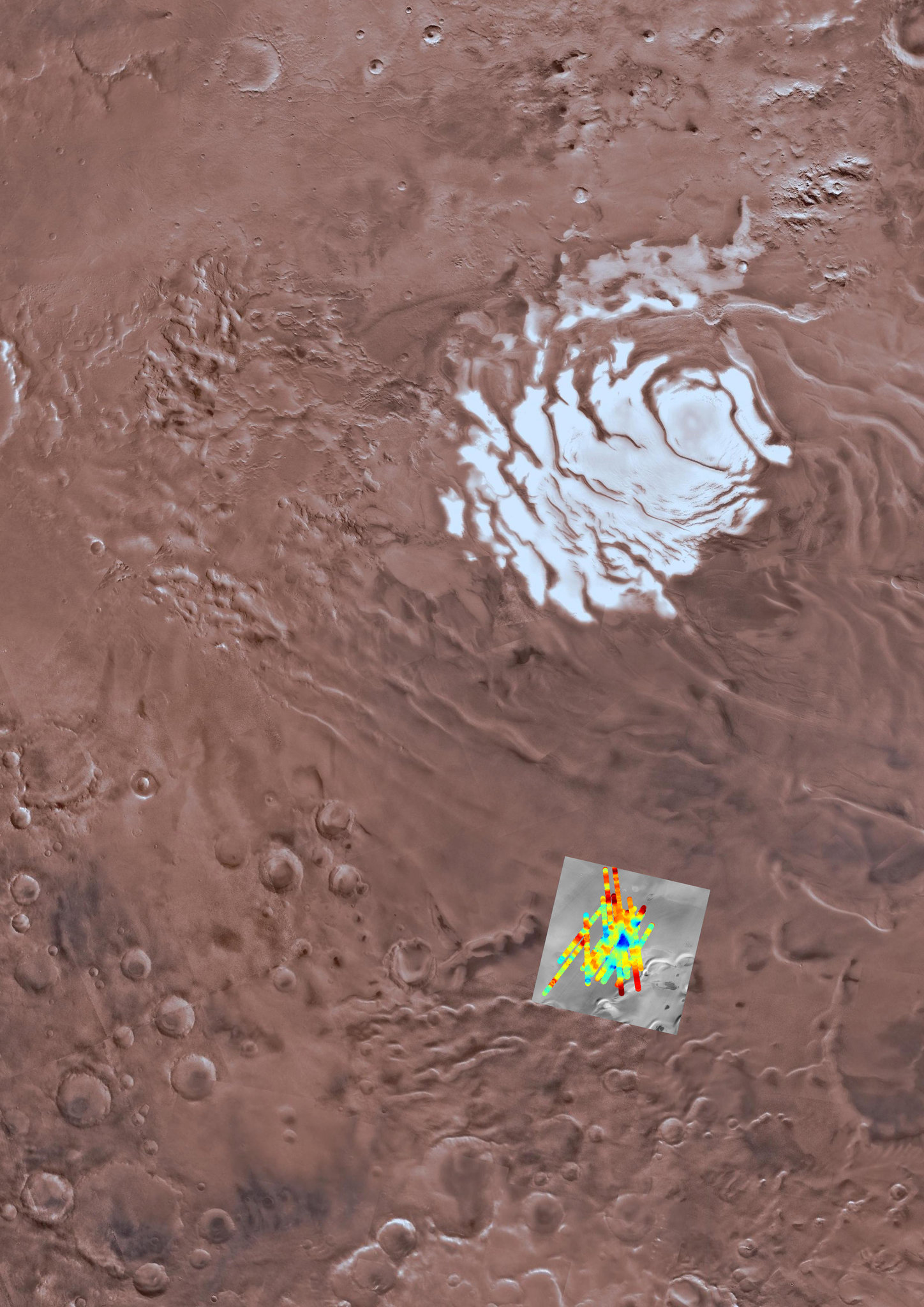
South Pole with subglacial water, 2018

- Activated new AOCMS software which includes a gyroless attitude estimator to prolong the lifetime of the spacecraft's laser gyros
- In July 2018, a discovery was reported based on MARSIS radar studies, of a subglacial lake on Mars, 1.5 km (0.93 mi) below the southern polar ice cap, and about 20 km (12 mi) wide, the first known stable body of water on Mars.
- December 2018: Mars Express relays images of the 80-kilometer wide Korolev Crater filled with approximately 2200 cubic kilometers of water ice on the Martian surface. Based on further evidence the crater ice is still part of much vaster ice resources at Mars poles.

==== 2019 ====
- Based on data from the HRSC camera, there is geological evidence of an ancient planet-wide groundwater system.

==== 2020 ====
- Between March and April 2020, Mars Express (along with other interplanetary missions by ESA) was briefly placed into a largely unattended safe configuration with science instruments turned off due to the worsening COVID-19 pandemic and the need to reduce on-site personnel at ESOC.
- In September 2020, a discovery was reported based on MARSIS radar studies, of three more subglacial lakes on Mars, 1.5 km (0.93 mi) below the southern polar ice cap. The size of the first lake found, and the largest, has been corrected to 30 km (19 mi) wide. It is surrounded by 3 smaller lakes, each a few kilometres wide.
- A study published in December 2020 in JGR Planets utilized the wide field of view of the Visual Monitoring Camera, in combination with other instruments on Mars Express and other orbiters, to describe the life cycle of a large elongated orographic cloud that grows and fades on a daily basis during spring and summer over Arsia Mons. A follow-up study published in 2022 used computational modeling to describe the physical mechanisms behind the cloud's formation.

==== 2021 ====
- Two studies published in December 2020 and January 2021, that analyzed SPICAM data, show that water escape to space is accelerated by dust storms and Mars's proximity to the Sun, and suggest that some water may have retreated underground.
- A study published in April 2021, that used SPICAM data to analyze the relationship between ozone and water vapour in the atmosphere of Mars, identified a previously unknown problem with climate models, that might be relevant also to studying the Earth's atmosphere.
- In November 2021, an experiment was performed to test whether Mars Express and the TGO lander relay communications radio could be used to perform radio occultation science, as well as a series of tests of data relay from the CNSA Zhurong rover.

==== 2022 ====
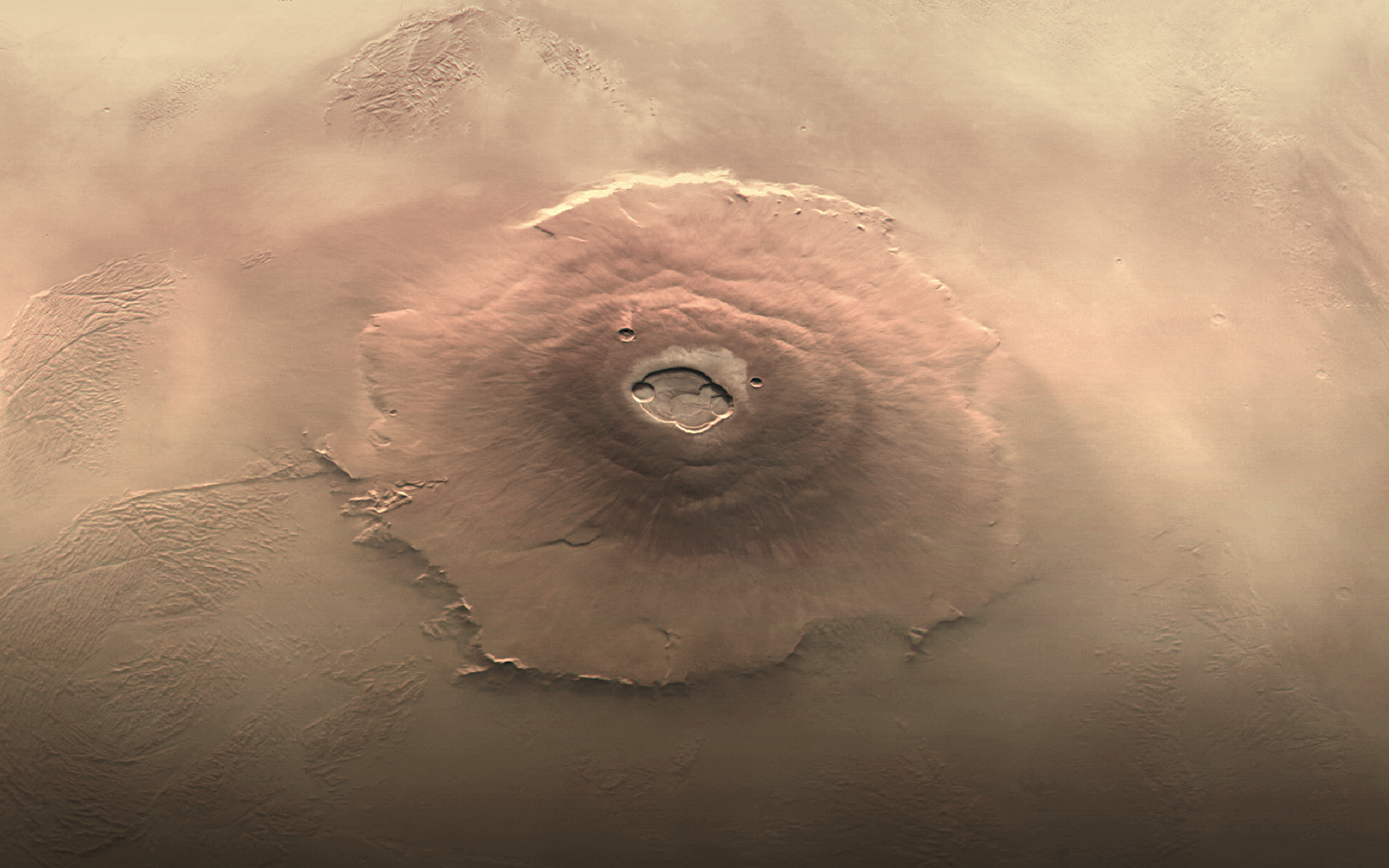
Olympus Mons, HRSC image

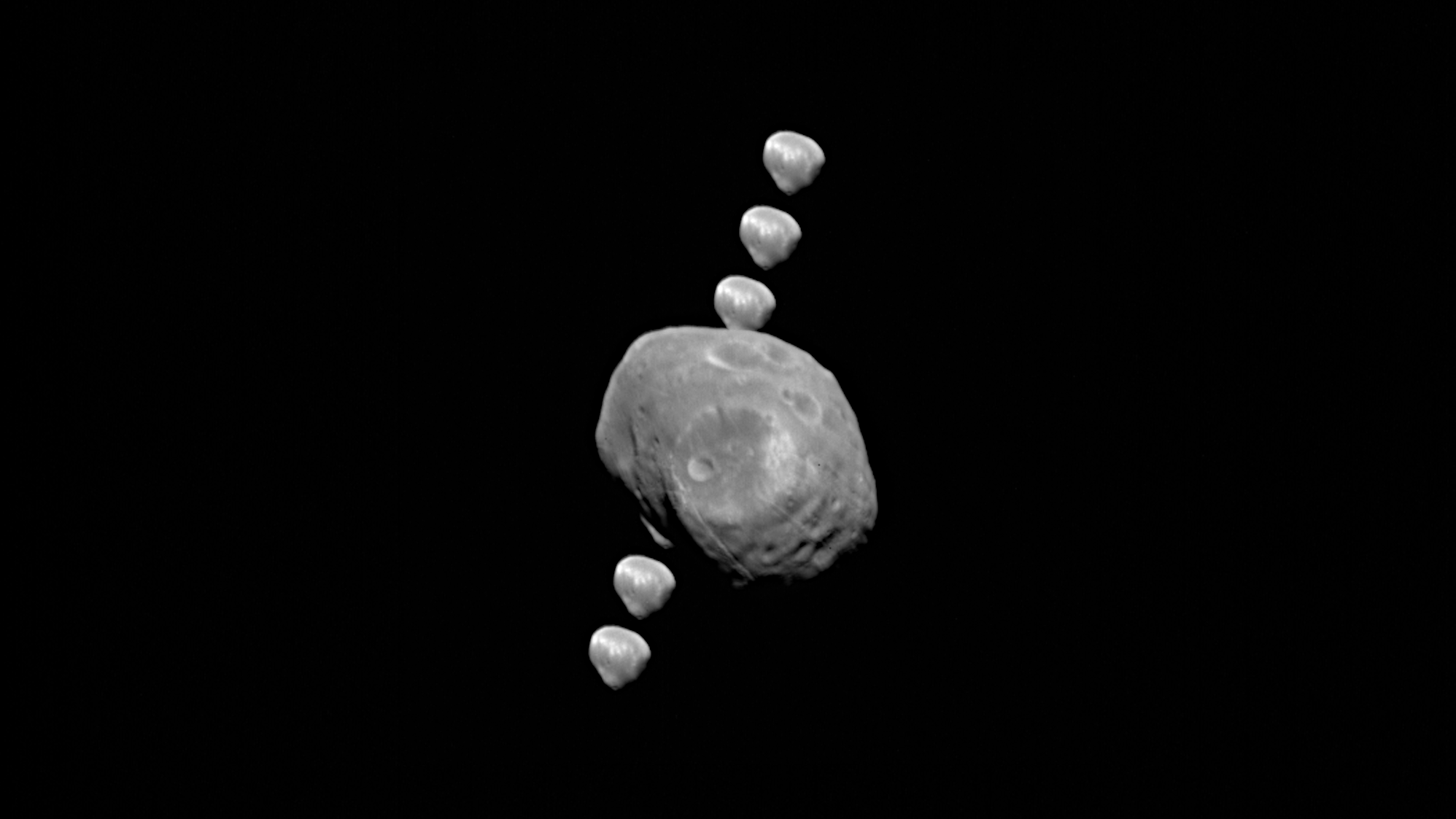
Occultation of Deimos by Phobos in 2023, by Andrea Luck

- In February 2022, a study was published in Earth and Planetary Science Letters demonstrating that liquid brines (water with perchlorate and chloride) are the best explanation for the MARSIS observations from 2018 interpreted as liquid water under the South pole of Mars. Such brines might not form actual underground lakes but could exist between grains of ice or sediment.
- On 14 February 2022, Mars Express observed a rare astronomical event — Deimos passing in front of Jupiter and its Galilean moons. Measuring the duration of the occultation enabled a more precise determination of the position and orbit of Deimos.
- In June 2022, an upgrade of the MARSIS instrument software was completed. The new version improved the performance of the instrument to push its performance beyond some of the old limitations.
- On 23 September 2022, Mars Express conducted a close flyby of Phobos and used the MARSIS instrument to probe the moon's subsurface structure from as close as 83 km. Operating MARSIS at such close distance was enabled by the recent software upgrade. The instrument was originally designed for studying Mars – at more than 250 km from the spacecraft.
- In November 2022, Mars Express performed data relay tests with NASA Perseverance rover, bringing the total number of other spacecraft supported by Mars Express in this way up to a record-breaking seven.

==== 2023 ====
- In January 2023, the first global high-resolution map of aqueous minerals (formed through interaction with water) at Mars was published using data from Mars Express's OMEGA and MRO's CRISM instruments.
- June 3: To celebrate the 20th anniversary of the spacecraft's launch, a livestream of images from the Visual Monitoring Camera was streamed online, marking the first livestream direct from Mars.

=== Third decade ===
==== 2024 ====
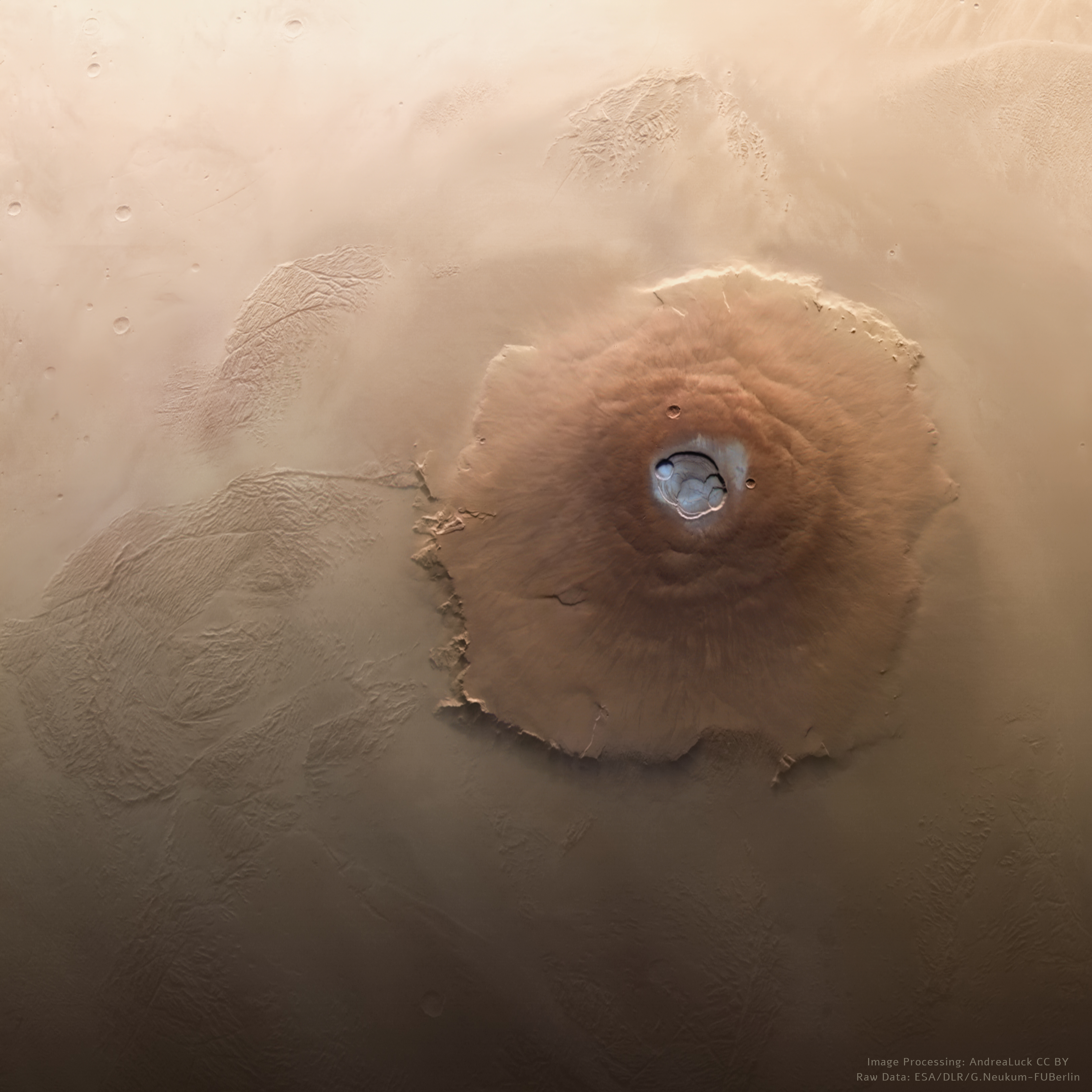
Frost on Olympus Mons

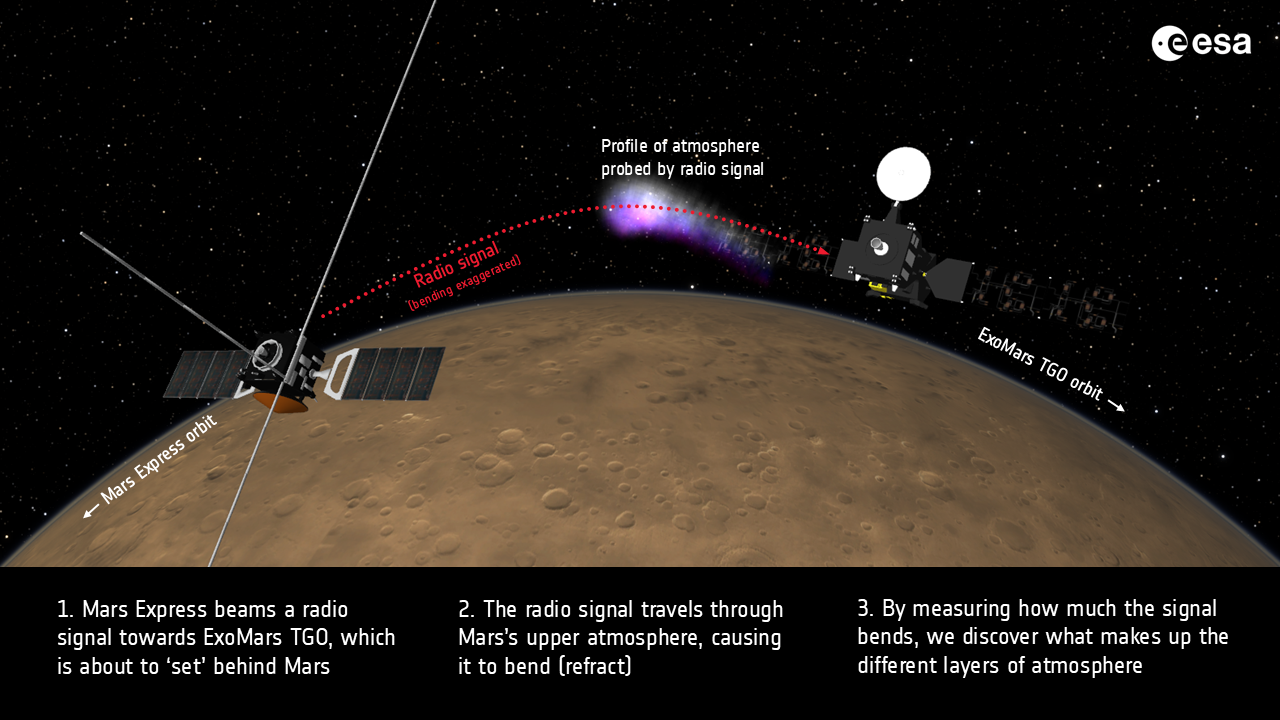
Mars Express and TGO probe Mars's atmosphere by radio occultation

- Published in January 2024, a new research analysed MARSIS radar data collected over the preceding decade and concluded that the Medusae Fossae Formation at Mars equator, previously thought to be likely composed of dry deposits, instead includes a large amount of water ice.
- In May 2024, computers on Mars Express (as well as on another ESA mission, BepiColombo) reported a sharp increase in the number of memory errors, coinciding with a massive solar flare from the active region AR3664, at that time facing away from Earth. The event was also observed in detail by ESA's Solar Orbiter.
- During May 2024 solar storms, Mars Express and TGO were performing radio occultation experiments and managed to measure the response of the Martian atmosphere to the solar storm. The two orbiters observed a dramatic increase in electrons in two distinct layers of the atmosphere with a 45% increase in 110 km above surface and a 278% increase in 130 km.
- In June 2024, a new study was published in Nature Geoscience, providing first evidence for water frost near Mars equator, specifically atop the Tharsis volcanoes. This work used data from ESA's Mars Express and TGO missions.
- In July 2024, a study was published in Radio Science documenting the first routine use of mutual radio occultation technique at another planet, specifically the measurements of physical properties of the Martian atmosphere conducted using a radio link between ESA's Mars Express and TGO orbiters between 2020 and 2023.
- In September 2024, a new cloud atlas of Mars has been published, containing images of Martian clouds by Mars Express from the past 20 years.

==== 2025 ====
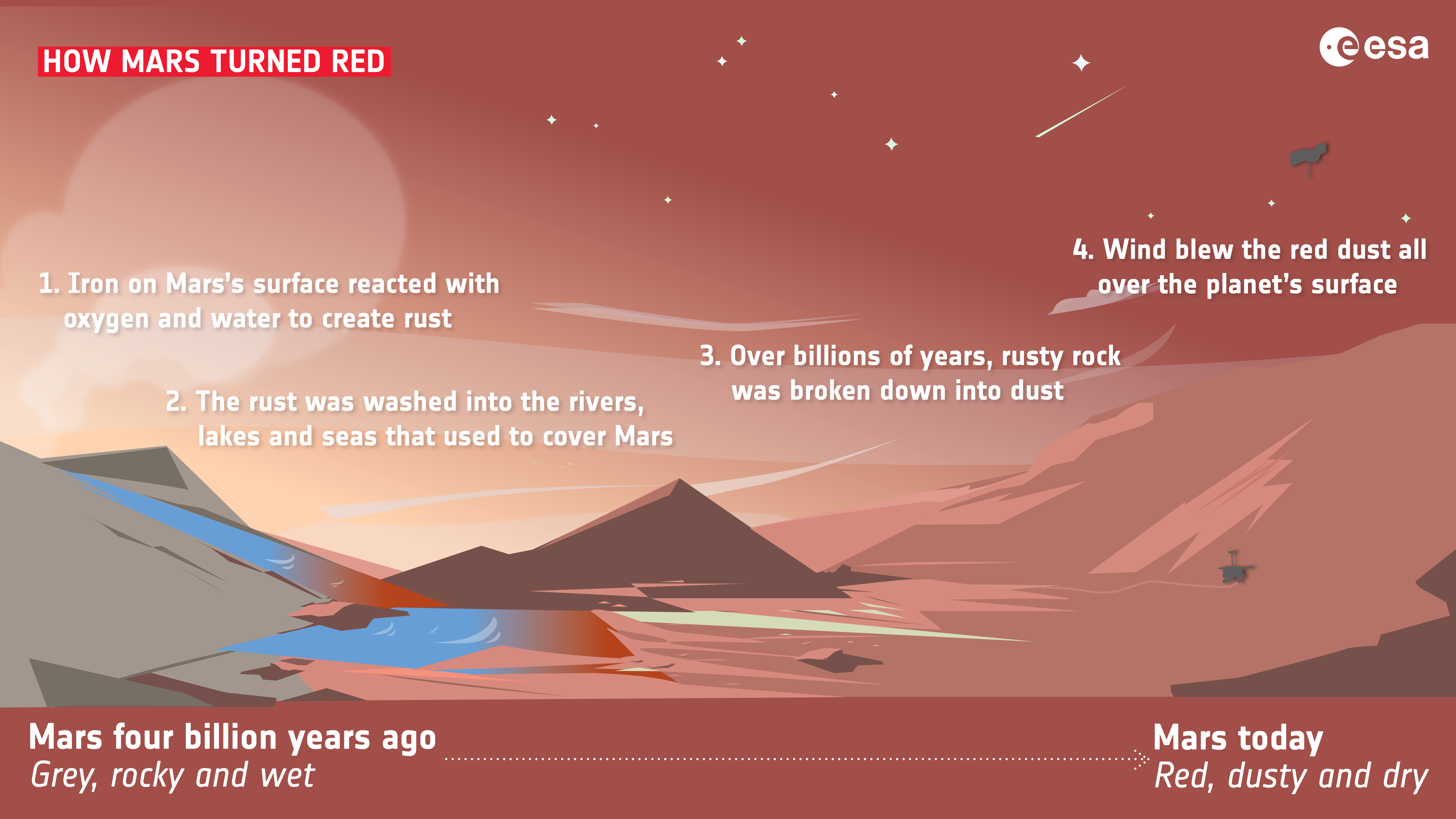
How Mars turned red

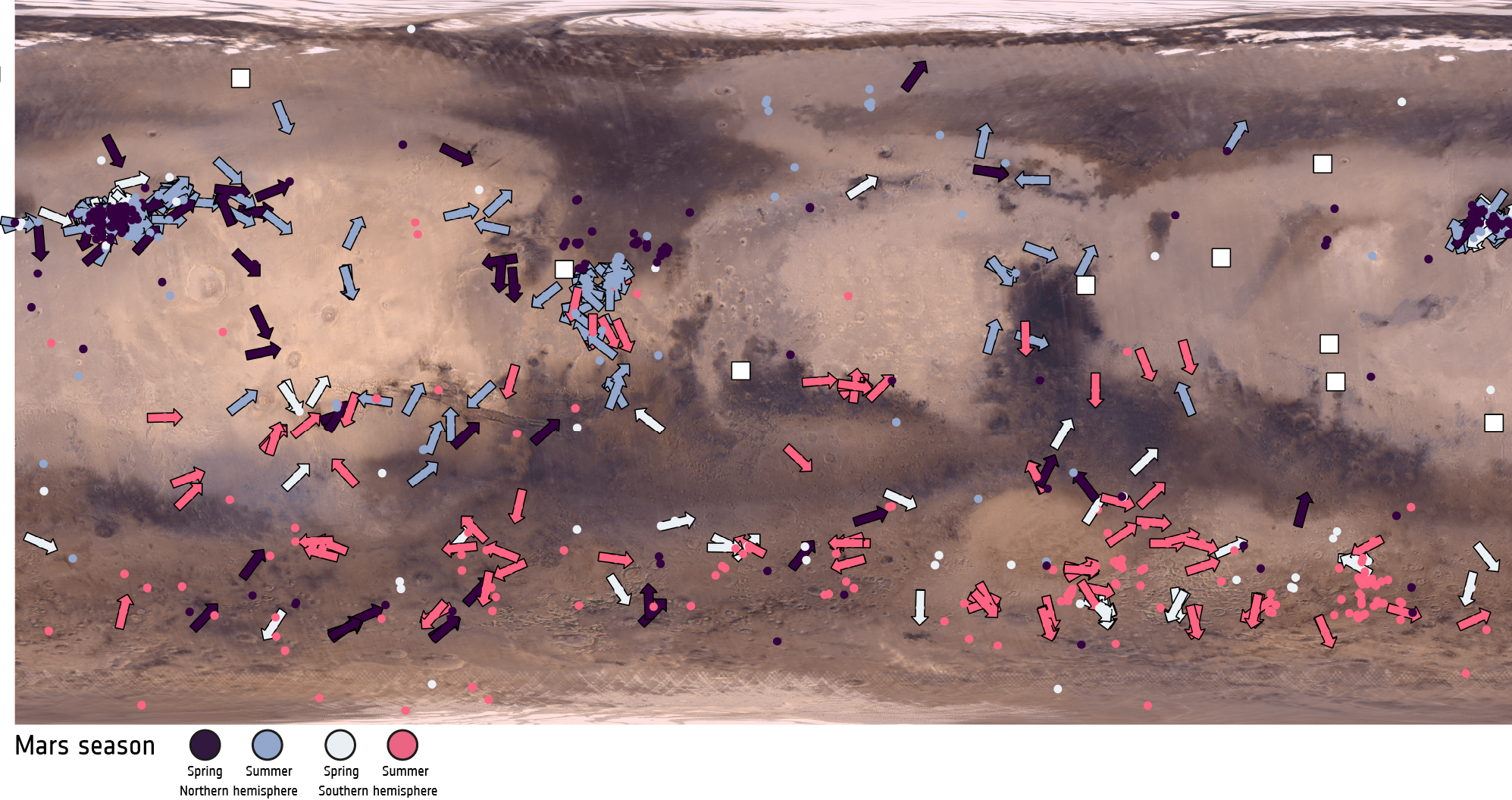
Tracking dust devils on Mars

- In February 2025, a study was published in Nature Communications suggesting that the red color of Mars is caused by iron oxides containing water, known as ferrihydrite, and not by hematite that forms under dry conditions, as thought before. This work used data from Mars Express and other spacecraft.
- In May 2025, ESA updated the software solution from 2018 which was meant to prolong the lifetime of the spacecraft's gyroscopes. This new update could allow Mars Express to stay operational until 2034 and be ready to support the MMX spacecraft in 2029.
- In June 2025, a comprehensive data set from Mars Express—TGO radio occultation observations has been made publicly available with a publication of a new study in JGR Planets analysing 71 full vertical profiles from such observations.
- In September 2025, scientists presented a method for predicting the green visible light aurora on Mars, which they developed using data from Mars Express, MAVEN, and Perseverance.
- In October 2025, scientists published a catalogue of 1039 Martian dust devils observed by Mars Express and TGO during past two decades. Their analyses show near-surface wind speeds of up to 44 m/s, faster than ever observed by surface probes.

==== 2026 ====
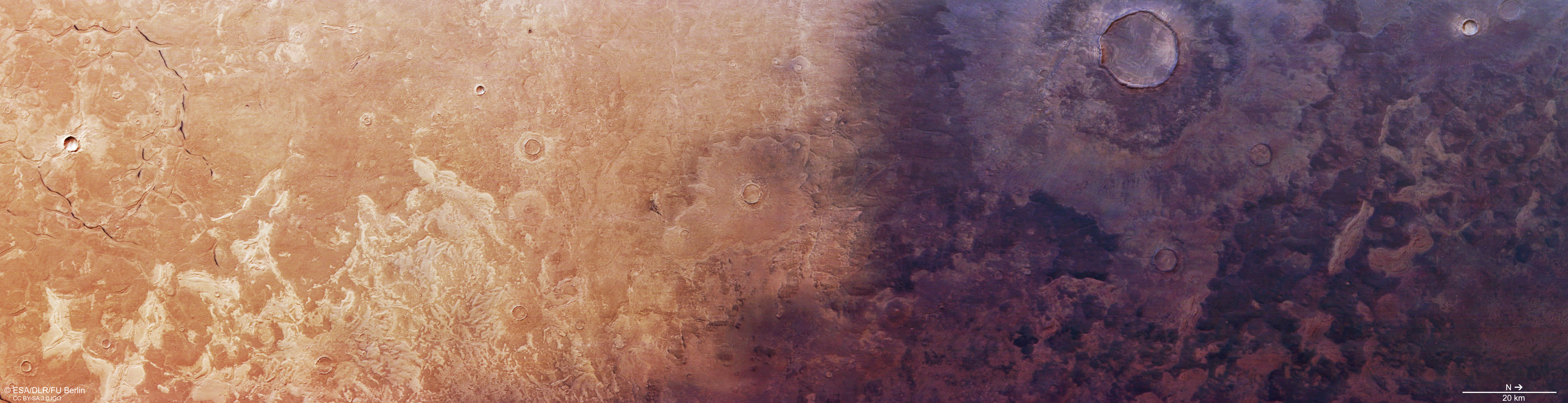
Dark ash covering Utopia Planitia

Purple ridges near Thyles Rupes

Arsia Mons Elongated Cloud formation by homogeneous ice nucleation: observation and simulation

- In April 2026, ESA published a new HRSC image of Utopia Planitia showing a fast spreading of dark volcanic ash across the area since it was photographed by the Viking orbiters in the 1970s, illustrating a rare large scale change on the surface of Mars in recent past.
- In May 2026, Mars Express coordinated its observations with NASA's Psyche spacecraft that was performing a gravity assist maneuver at Mars. The collected data may be used for calibrating Psyche's cameras.
- On 16 September 2026, ESA, DLR German Aerospace Center and FU Berlin released a new HRSC image showing Thyles Rupes, a large cliff-like tectonic feature on Mars, located in the planet's southern high latitudes. It is one of the more prominent scarps in the region surrounding the south polar area. The image shows an unusual purple hue of the landscape which is caused by a combination of dust and frost in local morning conditions.
- On 7 October 2026, researchers using Mars Express observations published a work in Nature Geoscience demonstrating that the recurring Arsia Mons Elongated Cloud may be formed by homogeneous ice nucleation, a cloud-forming process that doesn't require pre-existing particles and which was previously theorized to be possible on Earth and Venus but never observed in nature.

== See also ==
- List of European Space Agency programmes and missions
- European Space Agency
- ExoMars
- Exploration of Mars
- List of Mars orbiters
- List of missions to Mars
- Space exploration
- Uncrewed space mission
