= Venus Express =

European orbiter mission to Venus (2005–2015)

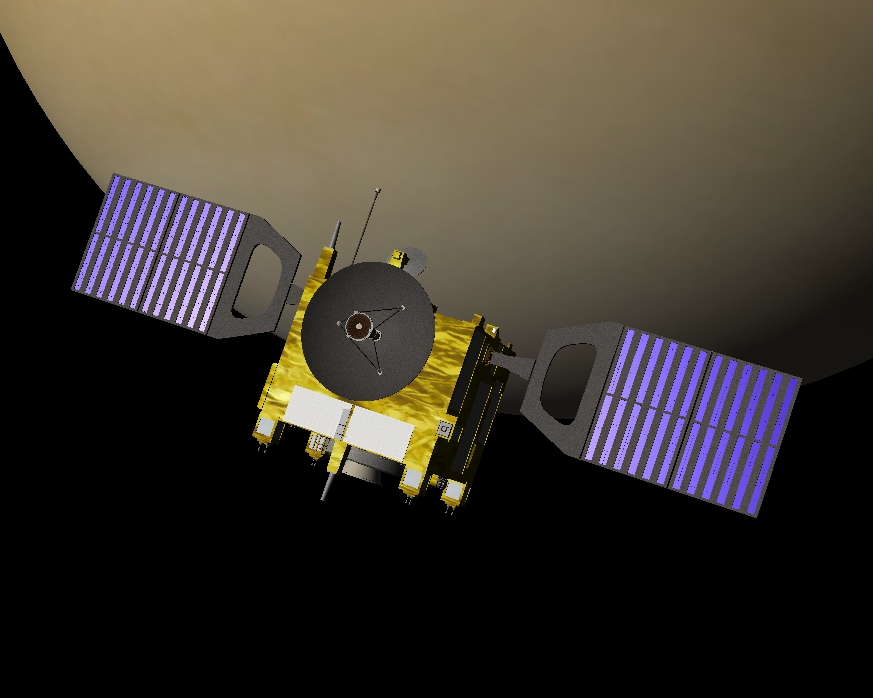
- Venus Express in orbit
- Mission type: Venus orbiter
- Operator: European Space Agency
- COSPAR ID: 2005-045A
- SATCAT no.: 28901
- Website: www.esa.int/venus
- Mission duration: Planned: 2 years Final: 9 years, 2 months, 9 days

Spacecraft properties
- Manufacturer: EADS Astrium
- Launch mass: 1,270 kg (2,800 lb)
- Dry mass: 700 kg (1,500 lb)
- Payload mass: 93 kg (205 lb)
- Dimensions: 1.5 × 1.8 × 1.4 m (4.9 × 5.9 × 4.6 ft)
- Power: 1,100 watts

Start of mission
- Launch date: 9 November 2005, 03:33:34 UTC
- Rocket: Soyuz-FG/Fregat
- Launch site: Baikonur 31/6
- Contractor: Starsem

End of mission
- Disposal: Deorbited
- Last contact: 18 January 2015, 15:01:55 UTC
- Decay date: January / February 2015

Orbital parameters
- Reference system: Cytherocentric
- Pericytherion altitude: 460 km (290 mi)
- Apocytherion altitude: 63,000 km (39,000 mi)
- Inclination: 90 degrees
- Period: 24 hours

Venus orbiter
- Orbital insertion: 11 April 2006
- Contemporary ESA insignia (2000s)

Venus Express (VEX) was the first Venus exploration mission of the European Space Agency (ESA). Launched in November 2005, it arrived at Venus in April 2006 and began continuously sending back science data from its polar orbit around Venus. Equipped with seven scientific instruments, the main objective of the mission was the long term observation of the Venusian atmosphere. The observation over such long periods of time had never been done in previous missions to Venus, and was key to a better understanding of the atmospheric dynamics. ESA concluded the mission in December 2014.

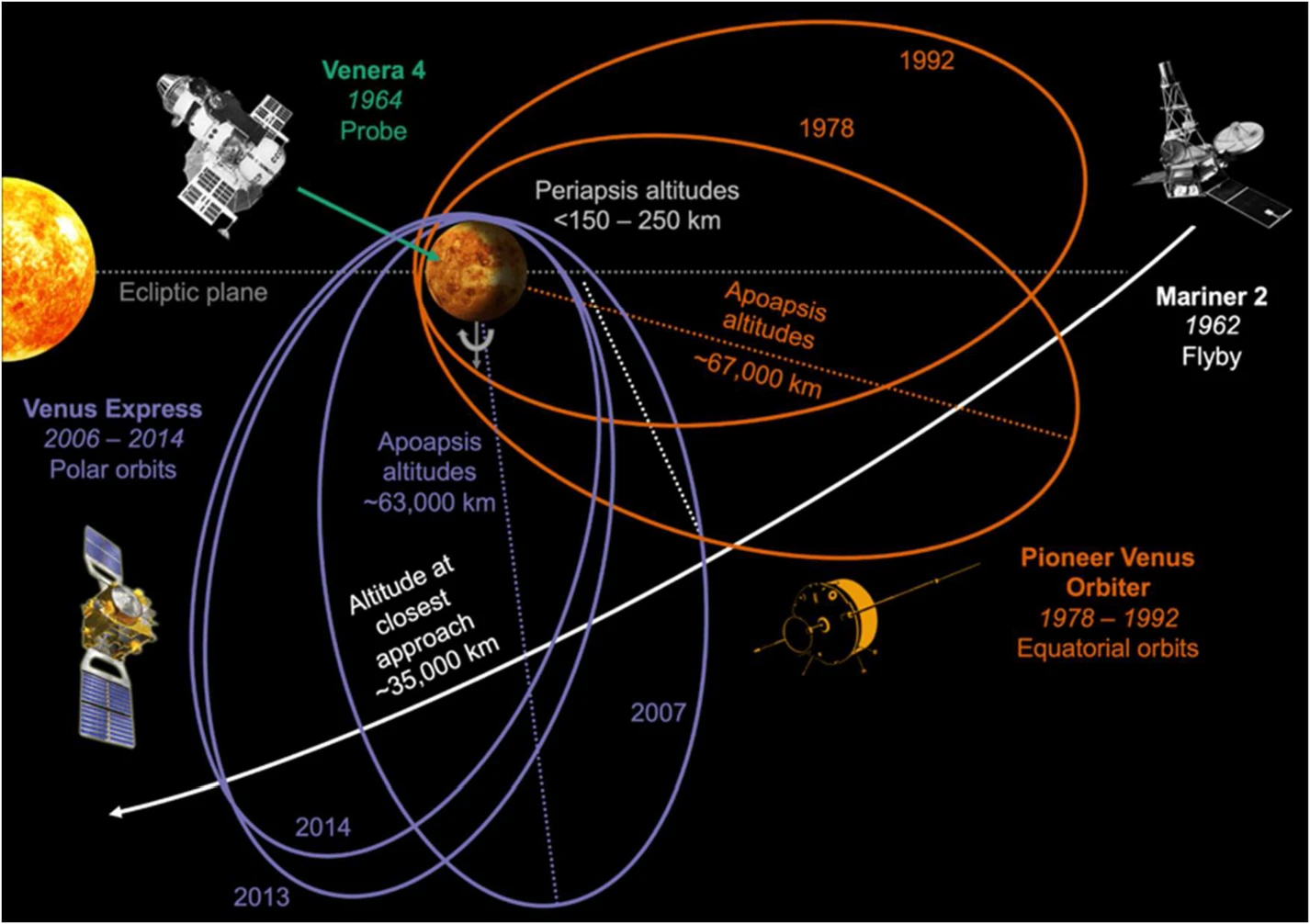
Orbits and trajectories of Mariner 2, Venera 4, Pioneer Venus Orbiter, and Venus Express

Animation of Venus Express's trajectory from 9 November 2005 to 31 December 2006 Venus Express · Venus · Earth · Sun

Animation of Venus Express's trajectory around Venus from 1 April 2006 to 1 April 2008 Venus Express · Venus

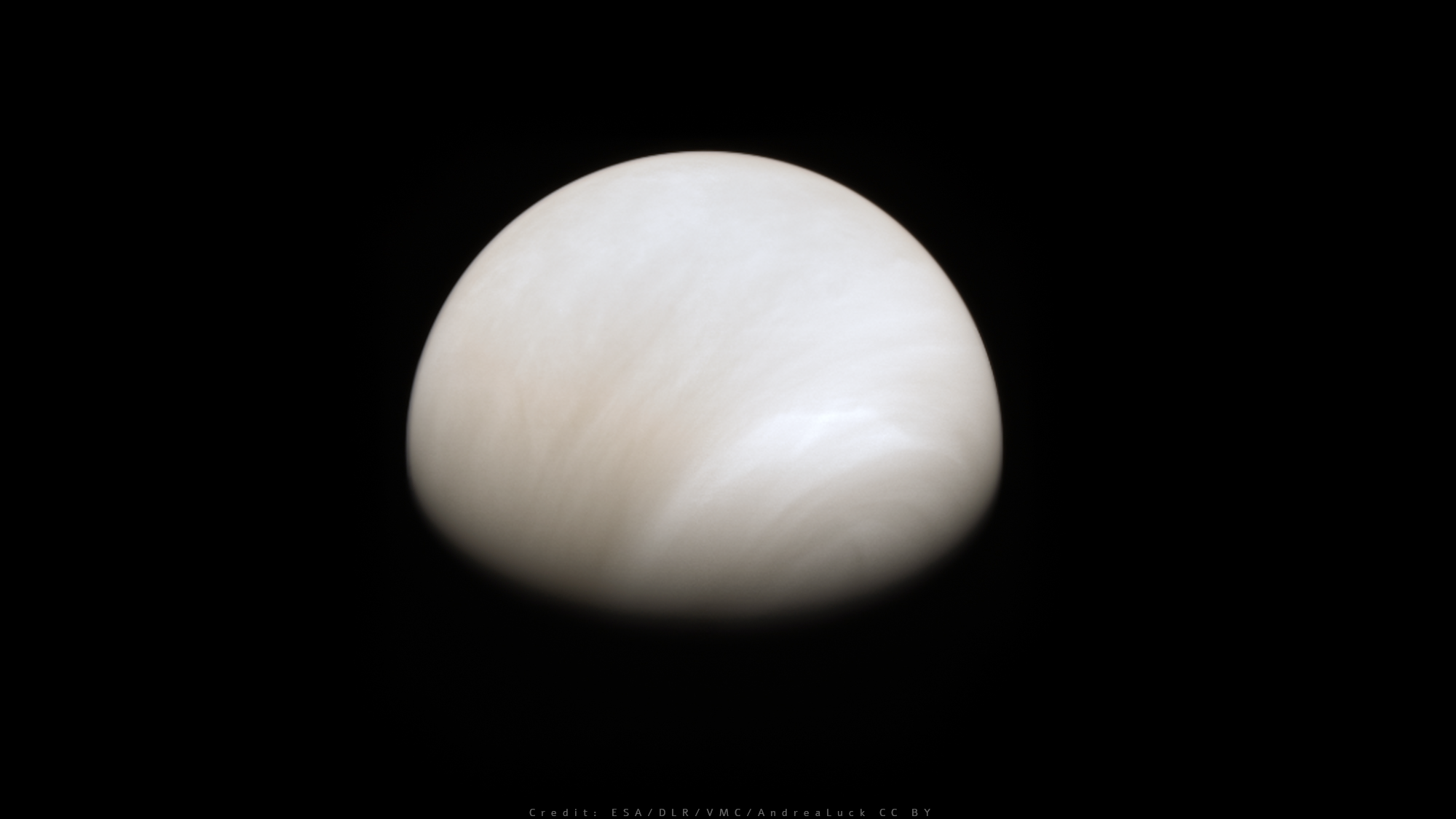
Venus, May 2006

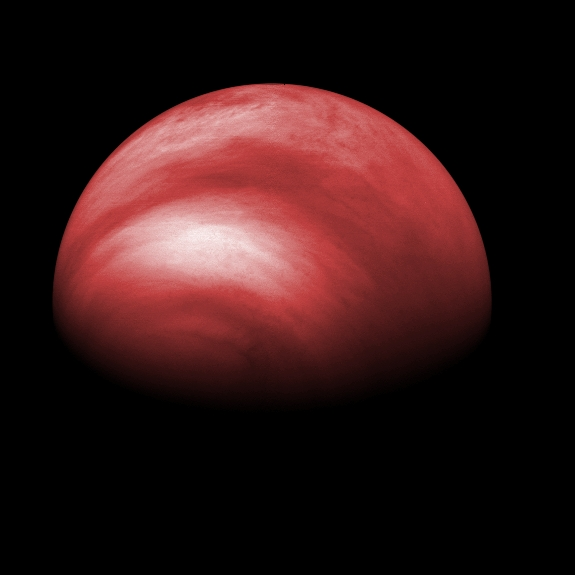
Ultraviolet picture (with arbitrary color) of Venus. The clouds betray the extremely fast winds at mid levels of the atmosphere, which circumnavigate the globe in just four days, August 2008

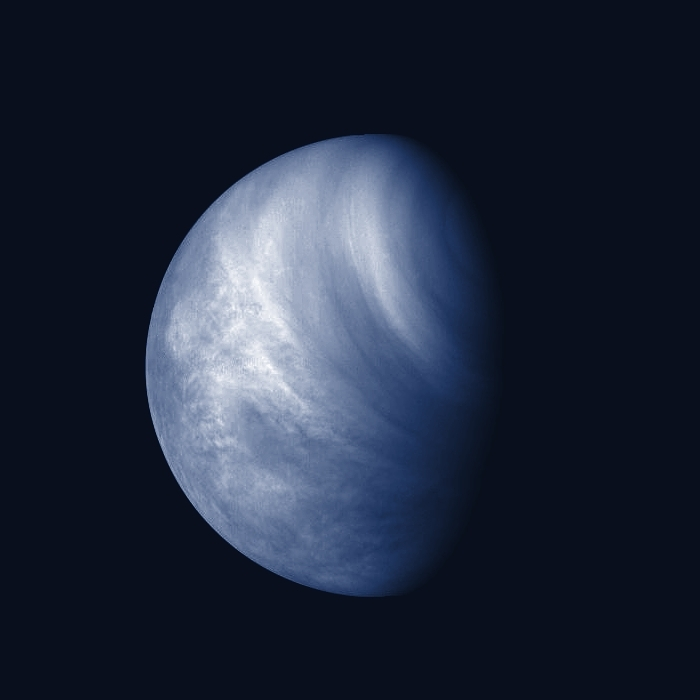
Ultraviolet picture colored to draw out highlights in the clouds, August 2008

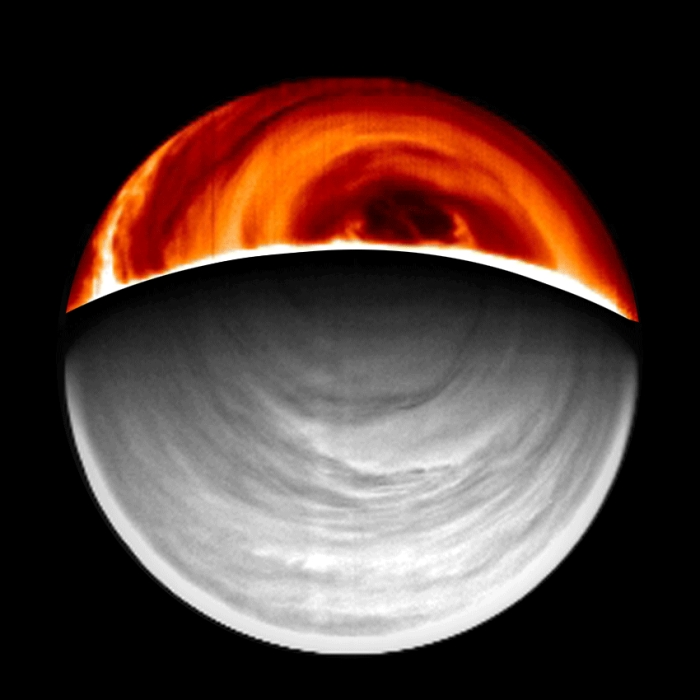
The daylight side shown in visible light and the night side in infrared, September 2008

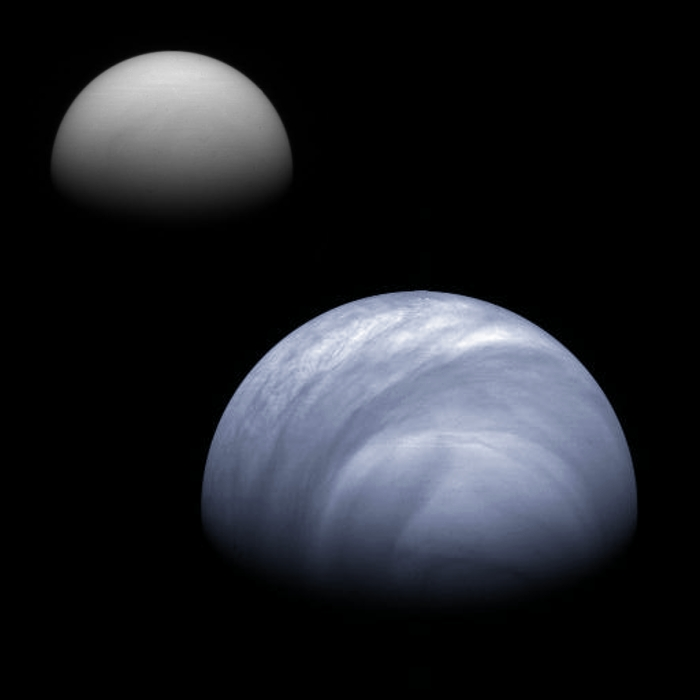
On the left is what the planet looked like in visible light: a nearly featureless orb of highly-reflective clouds. On the right is a shot taken at about the same time through a filter sensitive to ultraviolet light, which the human eye can't see, September 2008

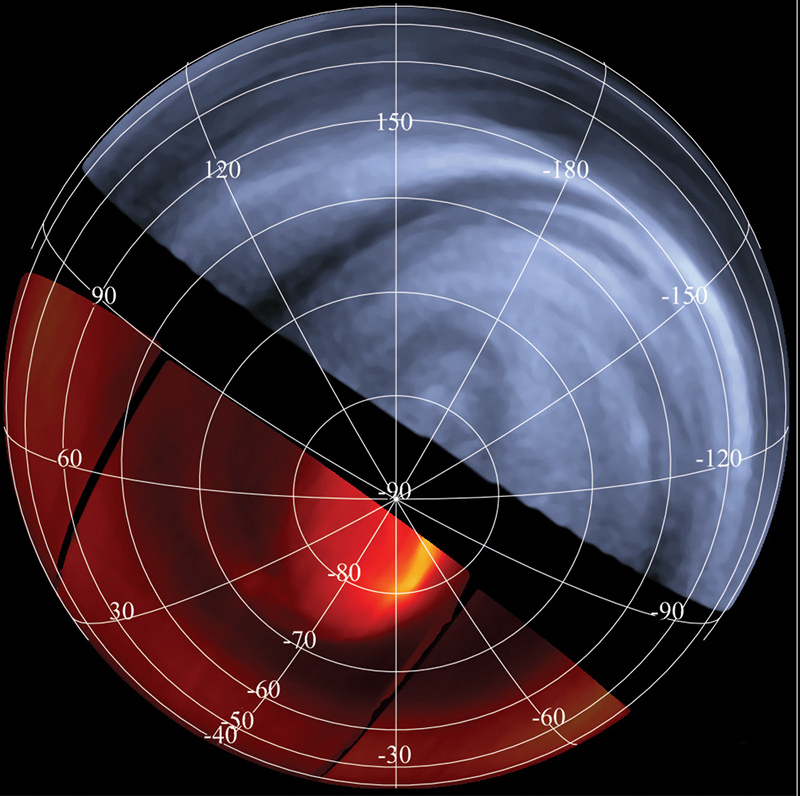
Venus in infrared (here as red) and ultraviolet light by Venus Express, December 2008

== Objectives ==
Starting out in the early planetary system with similar sizes and chemical compositions, the histories of Venus and Earth have diverged in spectacular fashion. The Venus Express data were intended to contribute not only to in-depth understanding of how the Venusian atmosphere is structured today, but also to understanding of the changes that led to the current greenhouse atmospheric conditions. Such investigations contribute to the study of climate change on Earth.

== Instruments ==
ASPERA-4: An acronym for "Analyzer of Space Plasmas and Energetic Atoms," ASPERA-4 investigated the interaction between the solar wind and the Venusian atmosphere, determine the impact of plasma processes on the atmosphere, determine global distribution of plasma and neutral gas, study energetic neutral atoms, ions and electrons, and analyze other aspects of the near Venus environment. ASPERA-4 is a re-use of the ASPERA-3 design used on Mars Express, but adapted for the harsher near-Venus environment.

MAG: The magnetometer was designed to measure the strength of Venus's magnetic field and the direction of it as affected by the solar wind and Venus itself. It mapped the magnetosheath, magnetotail, ionosphere, and magnetic barrier in high resolution in three-dimensions, aid ASPERA-4 in the study of the interaction of the solar wind with the atmosphere of Venus, identify the boundaries between plasma regions, and carry planetary observations as well (such as the search for and characterization of Venus lightning). MAG was derived from the Rosetta lander's ROMAP instrument.

One measuring device was placed on the body of the craft. The identical second of the pair was placed the necessary distance away from the body by unfolding a 1 m-long (3.3 ft) boom (carbon composite tube). Two redundant pyrotechnical cutters cut one loop of thin rope to free the power of metal springs. The driven knee lever rotated the boom perpendicularly outwards and latched it in place. Only the use of a pair of sensors together with the rotation of the probe allowed the spacecraft to resolve the small natural magnetic field beneath the disturbing fields of the probe itself.

The measurements to identify the fields produced by the craft took place on the route from Earth to Venus. The lack of magnetic cleanness was due to the reuse of the Mars Express spacecraft bus, which did not carry a magnetometer. By combining the data from two-point simultaneous measurements and using software to identify and remove interference generated by Venus Express itself, it was possible to obtain results of a quality comparable to those produced by a magnetically clean craft.

VMC: The Venus Monitoring Camera is a wide-angle, multi-channel CCD. The VMC is designed for global imaging of the planet. It operated in the visible (VIS), ultraviolet (UV), and near infrared (NIR1 and NIR2) spectral ranges, and maps surface brightness distribution searching for volcanic activity, monitoring airglow, studying the distribution of unknown ultraviolet absorbing phenomenon at the cloud-tops, and making other science observations.

It was derived in part from the Mars Express High Resolution Stereo Camera (HRSC) and the Rosetta Optical, Spectroscopic and Infrared Remote Imaging System (OSIRIS). The camera is based on a Kodak KAI-1010 Series, 1024 x 1024 pixel interline CCD, and included an FPGA to pre-process image data, reducing the amount transmitted to Earth.

The consortium of institutions responsible for the VMC included the Max Planck Institute for Solar System Research, the Institute of Planetary Research at the German Aerospace Center and the Institute of Computer and Communication Network Engineering at Technische Universität Braunschweig. It is not to be confused with Visual Monitoring Camera mounted on Mars Express, of which it is an evolution.

Venus Monitoring Camera channels
VMC Channel	Central Wavelength	Spectral Range
VIS	513 nm	503 – 523 nm
NIR1	935 nm	900 – 970 nm
NIR2	1.01 μm	990 – 1030 nm
UV	365 nm	345 – 385 nm

PFS: The "Planetary Fourier Spectrometer" (PFS) should have operated in the infrared between the 0.9 μm and 45 μm wavelength range and was designed to perform vertical optical sounding of the Venus atmosphere. It should have performed global, long-term monitoring of the three-dimensional temperature field in the lower atmosphere (cloud level up to 100 kilometers).

Furthermore, it should have searched for minor atmospheric constituents that may be present, but had not yet been detected, analyzed atmospheric aerosols, and investigated surface to atmosphere exchange processes. The design was based on a spectrometer on Mars Express, but modified for optimal performance for the Venus Express mission. However PFS failed during its deployment and no useful data was transmitted.

SPICAV: The "SPectroscopy for Investigation of Characteristics of the Atmosphere of Venus" (SPICAV) is an imaging spectrometer that was used for analyzing radiation in the infrared and ultraviolet wavelengths. It was derived from the SPICAM instrument flown on Mars Express. However, SPICAV had an additional channel known as SOIR (Solar Occultation at Infrared) that was used to observe the Sun through Venus's atmosphere in the infrared.

VIRTIS: The "Visible and Infrared Thermal Imaging Spectrometer" (VIRTIS) was an imaging spectrometer that observed in the near-ultraviolet, visible, and infrared parts of the electromagnetic spectrum. It analyzed all layers of the atmosphere, surface temperature and surface/atmosphere interaction phenomena.

VeRa: Venus Radio Science was a radio sounding experiment that transmitted radio waves from the spacecraft and passed them through the atmosphere or reflected them off the surface. These radio waves were received by a ground station on Earth for analysis of the ionosphere, atmosphere and surface of Venus. It was derived from the Radio Science Investigation instrument flown on Rosetta.

== Mission history ==
=== Background ===
The mission was proposed in 2001 to reuse the design of the Mars Express mission. However, some mission characteristics led to design changes: primarily in the areas of thermal control, communications and electrical power. For example, since Mars is approximately twice as far from the Sun as Venus, the radiant heating of the spacecraft was four times as great for Venus Express than Mars Express. Also, the ionizing radiation environment was harsher. On the other hand, the more intense illumination of the solar panels resulted in more generated photovoltaic power. The Venus Express mission also used some spare instruments developed for the Rosetta spacecraft. The mission was proposed by a consortium led by D. Titov (Germany), E. Lellouch (France), and F. Taylor (United Kingdom).

=== Launch campaign ===
Venus Express completed its final phase of testing at Astrium Intespace facility in Toulouse, France on 3 August 2005 and arrived at the airport of the Baikonur Cosmodrome on 7 August 2005. First flight verification test was completed on 16 August 2005. Integrated System Test-3 was completed on 22 August 2005. Last major system test successfully started on 30 August 2005. Electrical testing was completed on 5 September 2005. The Fuelling Readiness Review was completed on 21 September 2005. The spacecraft was mated to the Fregat upper stage on 12 October 2005.

The launch window for Venus Express was open from 26 October to 23 November 2005, with the launch initially set for 26 October 4:43 UTC. However, problems with the insulation from the Fregat upper stage (detected on 21 October 2005) led to a two-week launch delay to inspect and clear out the small insulation debris that migrated on the spacecraft. The spacecraft arrived at launch pad on 5 November 2005 and it was launched by a Soyuz-FG/Fregat rocket on 9 November 2005 at 03:33:34 UTC into a parking Earth orbit and 1 h 36 min after launch put into its transfer orbit to Venus.

=== In space ===
Three trajectory correction maneuvers were successfully performed on 11 November 2005, 24 February 2006, and 29 March 2006. The main engine was fired successfully on 17 February 2006 in a dress rehearsal for the arrival maneuver. The command stack for orbit insertion maneuver was loaded on the spacecraft on 7 April 2006. The spacecraft arrived at Venus on 11 April 2006, after 153 days of journey, and fired its main engine between 07:10:29 and 08:00:42 UTC SCET to reduce its velocity so that it could be captured by Venusian gravity into an orbit of 400 by 330,000 kilometres (250 by 205,050 mi). The burn was monitored from ESA's Control Centre ESOC in Darmstadt, Germany. The period of this initial orbit was nine days.

Venus Orbit Insertion (VOI) timeline
Event	Spacecraft event time (UTC)	Ground receive time (UTC)
Liquid Settling Phase start	07:07:56	07:14:41
VOI main engine start	07:10:29	07:17:14
periapsis passage	07:36:35	
eclipse start	07:37:46	
occultation start	07:38:30	07:45:15
occultation end	07:48:29	07:55:14
eclipse end	07:55:11	
VOI burn end	08:00:42	08:07:28

Seven further orbit control maneuvers, two with the main engine and five with the thrusters, were required for Venus Express to reach its final operational 24-hour orbit around Venus. First images of Venus from Venus Express were released on 13 April 2006.

Apoapsis Lowering Manoeuvres (ALM) timeline
Time	Event	Result
20 April 2006	Apoapsis Lowering Manoeuvre #1	Orbital period changed to 40 hours
23 April 2006	Apoapsis Lowering Manoeuvre #2	Orbital period changed to 25 hours 43 minutes
26 April 2006	Apoapsis Lowering Manoeuvre #3	slight fix to previous ALM

=== In target orbit ===
Venus Express entered its target orbit at apoapsis on 7 May 2006 at 13:31 UTC, when the spacecraft was 151,000,000 kilometres (94,000,000 mi) from Earth. At this point the spacecraft was running on an ellipse substantially closer to the planet than during the initial orbit. The polar orbit ranged between 250 and 66,000 kilometres (160 and 41,010 mi) over Venus. The periapsis was located almost above the North pole (80° North latitude), and it took 24 hours for the spacecraft to travel around the planet.

Venus Express studied the Venusian atmosphere and clouds in detail, the plasma environment and the surface characteristics of Venus from orbit. It also made global maps of the Venusian surface temperatures. Its nominal mission was originally planned to last for 500 Earth days (approximately two Venusian sidereal days) until 19 September 2007, but the mission was extended five times: first on 28 February 2007 until early May 2009; then on 4 February 2009 until 31 December 2009; and then on 7 October 2009 until 31 December 2012. On 22 November 2010, the mission was extended to 2014. On 20 June 2013, the mission was extended a final time until 2015. Between 18 June and 11 July 2014, the spacecraft performed successful aerobraking experiments with multiple passes at 131 to 135 km altitude.

=== End of mission ===
On 28 November 2014, mission control lost contact with Venus Express. Intermittent contact was reestablished on 3 December 2014, though there was no control over the spacecraft, likely due to exhaustion of propellant. On 16 December 2014, ESA announced that the Venus Express mission had ended. A carrier signal was still being received from the vehicle, but no data was being transmitted. Mission manager Patrick Martin expected the spacecraft would fall below 150 kilometres (93 mi) in early January 2015, with destruction occurring in late January or early February. The spacecraft's carrier signal was last detected by ESA on 18 January 2015.

== Science results ==
- 14 December 2006: First temperature map of the southern hemisphere.
- 27 November 2007: A series of papers was published in Nature giving the initial findings. It finds evidence for past oceans. It confirms the presence of lightning on Venus and that it is more common on Venus than it is on Earth. It also reports the discovery that a huge double atmospheric vortex exists at the south pole of the planet.
- 20 May 2008: The detection by the VIRTIS instrument of hydroxyl (OH) in the atmosphere of Venus is reported in the May 2008 issue of Astronomy & Astrophysics.
- October 2008: Venus Express was used to observe signs of life on Earth from Venus orbit. In images acquired by the probe, Earth was less than one pixel in size, which mimics observations of Earth-sized planets in other planetary systems. These observations were then used to develop methods for habitability studies of exoplanets.
- 25 August 2011: A layer of ozone was found in the upper atmosphere of Venus.
- 1 October 2012: A cold layer, where dry ice may exist, was found in the atmosphere of Venus.
- November 2025: Analysis of data from Venus Express and Akatsuki show that diurnal thermal tides are the primary driver of transporting momentum toward the tops of Venus's clouds, contributing substantially to the atmosphere's superrotation.

== See also ==
- List of ESA programmes and missions
- Uncrewed space mission
- List of planetary probes
- List of missions to Venus
- List of uncrewed spacecraft by program
- Space exploration
- Space telescope
- Space probe
- Timeline of artificial satellites and space probes
- Timeline of planetary exploration
