= Micro-Imaging Dust Analysis System =

Scientific instrument on the Rosetta spacecraft

MIDAS
- Operator: ESA
- Manufacturer: Austria, the Netherlands and Germany
- Instrument type: Atomic force microscope
- Function: Elemental analiser
- Mission duration: 12 years, 6 months, 28 days
- Began operations: 6 August 2014
- Ceased operations: 30 September 2016

Properties
- Mass: 8.0 kg
- Power consumption: 7.4 W

Host spacecraft
- Spacecraft: Rosetta spacecraft
- Operator: European Space Agency
- Launch date: 2 March 2004
- Rocket: Ariane 5G+ V-158
- Launch site: Kourou ELA-3
- COSPAR ID: 2004-006A
- Orbit: Comet 67P/Churyumov–Gerasimenko

The Micro-Imaging Dust Analysis System (MIDAS) is one of several instruments on the European Space Agency's Rosetta mission which studied in-situ the environment around the active comet 67P/Churyumov–Gerasimenko as it flew into the inner Solar System. MIDAS is an atomic force microscope (AFM) designed to collect dust particles emitted from the comet, and then scan them with a very sharp needle-like tip to determine their 3D structure, size and texture with very high resolution (4 nanometers).

== Science goals ==
MIDAS is the first instrument capable of imaging the smallest cometary dust particles in-situ. Some interplanetary dust particles collected in the Earth's stratosphere have been shown to have a cometary origin, but their precise provenance is typically unknown. The Stardust mission returned many cometary dust particles, collected during a fast flyby of comet 81P/Wild in aerogel, but these were highly modified, crushed and melted during deceleration and return to Earth. MIDAS was used primarily in particles a few micrometers in diameter or smaller.

By collecting and imaging dust particles —tiny pieces of rock, ice and Organic compounds — emitted from comet 67P/Churyumov–Gerasimenko as it passes through the inner Solar System, MIDAS address questions including:

1. What is the size and morphology of individual grains?
2. What is the alteration history of individual grains?
3. What is the size distribution of the smallest particles?
4. Are grains crystalline or amorphous?
5. Are grains compact, or highly porous and "fluffy"?
6. What is the smallest "building block" of a grain?

Since comets are thought to be ancient, and contain material unchanged since their formation in the early Solar System, these questions will directly help support theories on the Solar System formation. The Principal Investigator is Mark Bentley from The Space Research Institute (IWF) in Austria. The hardware is contributed by universities in Austria, the Netherlands and Germany.

== Instrument description ==
MIDAS is mounted on the nadir panel of the Rosetta spacecraft and is composed of three main subsystems and an electronics box:

- a funnel, shutter and collimator to control dust collection
- a sample handling stage to collect and manipulate collected dust
- an atomic force microscope.

Dust collection is performed when close to the comet by opening the shutter and placing one of 61 targets directly behind the funnel. A collimator ensures that only one target at a time can be exposed. The targets are rectangular and 1.4 × 2.4 mm in size and are mounted around the circumference of a wheel. Rotating this wheel moves a target from the dust collection (exposure) position to the analysis (scanning) position. Once sufficient dust has been collected, the shutter is closed and the exposed target moved in front of one of 16 cantilevers. Each cantilever is fitted with a sharp tip; since these can be worn down in operation, the sixteen tips provide redundancy for the one year of nominal operation.

=== Cantilevers and tips ===
Each of the MIDAS cantilevers is piezo-resistive, meaning that its deflection is measured by a change in resistance, not by the reflection of laser light from the cantilever as in many commercial instruments. In this way the need for intricate optical alignment is avoided and the instrument could be made sufficiently robust to withstand launch. Sixteen cantilevers are carried for redundancy, each with a sharp tip of approximately 10 μm long. Four are coated with a cobalt alloy to allow magnetic force microscopy of collected dust.

=== Sample handling ===
The MIDAS targets, on which dust particles are collected, are made of silicon and are rectangular in shape, with a dimension of 1.4 × 2.4 mm. Most are coated with a sol gel coating which aids in sticking particles to the targets. Three calibration targets are also carried, which allow calibration of the scanner in XY and in Z, and allow imaging of the tip shape. All 64 targets are mounted on the circumference of a wheel, which rotates to select a sample, to provide coarse Y positioning, and to move samples from the exposure to scanning position. The wheel can also be moved laterally, moving the wheel in front of each of the 16 cantilevers, and allowing for coarse X positioning.

==== Coarse approach stage ====
Before a sample can be scanned, the microscope has to be brought close to the sample. This is achieved by a coarse approach stage driven by a brushed DC motor encased in a pressurised vacuum bellows. This motor drives a spindle which in turn raises or lowers a wheel placed in a spring-loaded wedge, as shown in the diagram. This allows the entire microscope stage to be moved by about 0.5 mm.

==== Sample stage ====
The heart of the instrument is a precision XYZ stage with a travel of approximately 100 × 100 μm in XY and 10 μm in Z directions. Driven by piezo actuators this stage moves the selected cantilever and tip across the sample in a raster pattern, measuring the height of the sample at each point.

== Instrument specifications ==
The following table summarises the key characteristics of the instrument:

Parameter	In-flight performance
Mass	8.0 kg
Power	7.4 W (average)
Lateral resolution	3.8 nm
Height resolution	0.16 nm
Height range	8 μm
Scan field	min: 0.97 μm, max: 94 μm
Image resolution	32 × 32 - 512 × 512 pixels, 14 bits/pixel
Working modes	Contact, dynamic, magnetic
Data channels	Topography, error signal, phase shift, cantilever DC, AC, X/Y/Z-voltage & position

When the spacecraft was taken out of hibernation mode on 20 January 2014, the MIDAS computer software was updated, and the instrument is being calibrated and tested.

== Results ==
Although MIDAS has been operated during the long (10 year) cruise phase, it has never been in an environment where significant dust was expected. Thus the only results available to date are reference scans of the calibration and blank targets. Scientific data should be available to the public when the mission starts its primary science phase in November 2014, subject to the usual 6 months proprietary period. Data was made available via the ESA Planetary Science Archive (PSA), where a dedicated Rosetta section is available.
