= Wolfgang Baumjohann =

Austrian astrophysicist

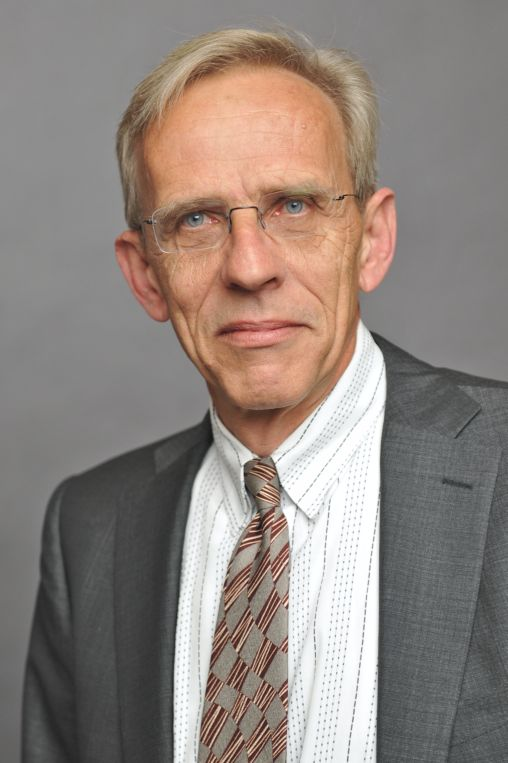
- Wolfgang Baumjohann
- Born: August 9, 1950 (age 76); Hamm, North Rhine-Westphalia, Austria
- Occupations: Astrophysicist, academic

Wolfgang Baumjohann (born August 9, 1950) is an Austrian astrophysicist and academic. He was the director of the Institute of Space Research at the Austrian Academy of Sciences from 2004 to 2021.

== Education and career ==
Baumjohann studied physics and geophysics at Münster University from 1969 to 1975, earning his doctorate in 1981 and working as a research assistant there until 1983. He became director of the Institute of Space Research in Graz in 2004, succeeding Hans Sünkel. He had joined the institute in 2001 as Riedler's successor and was also an adjunct professor at LMU Munich and an honorary professor at Graz University of Technology.

He received the Austrian Decoration for Science and Art award, in 2007.

In April 2022, Baumjohann was elected to the position of president of the Mathematical and Natural Sciences Class within the Austrian Academy of Sciences.
