= Rosetta (spacecraft) =

European mission to study Comet 67P/Churyumov-Gerasimenko (2004–2016)

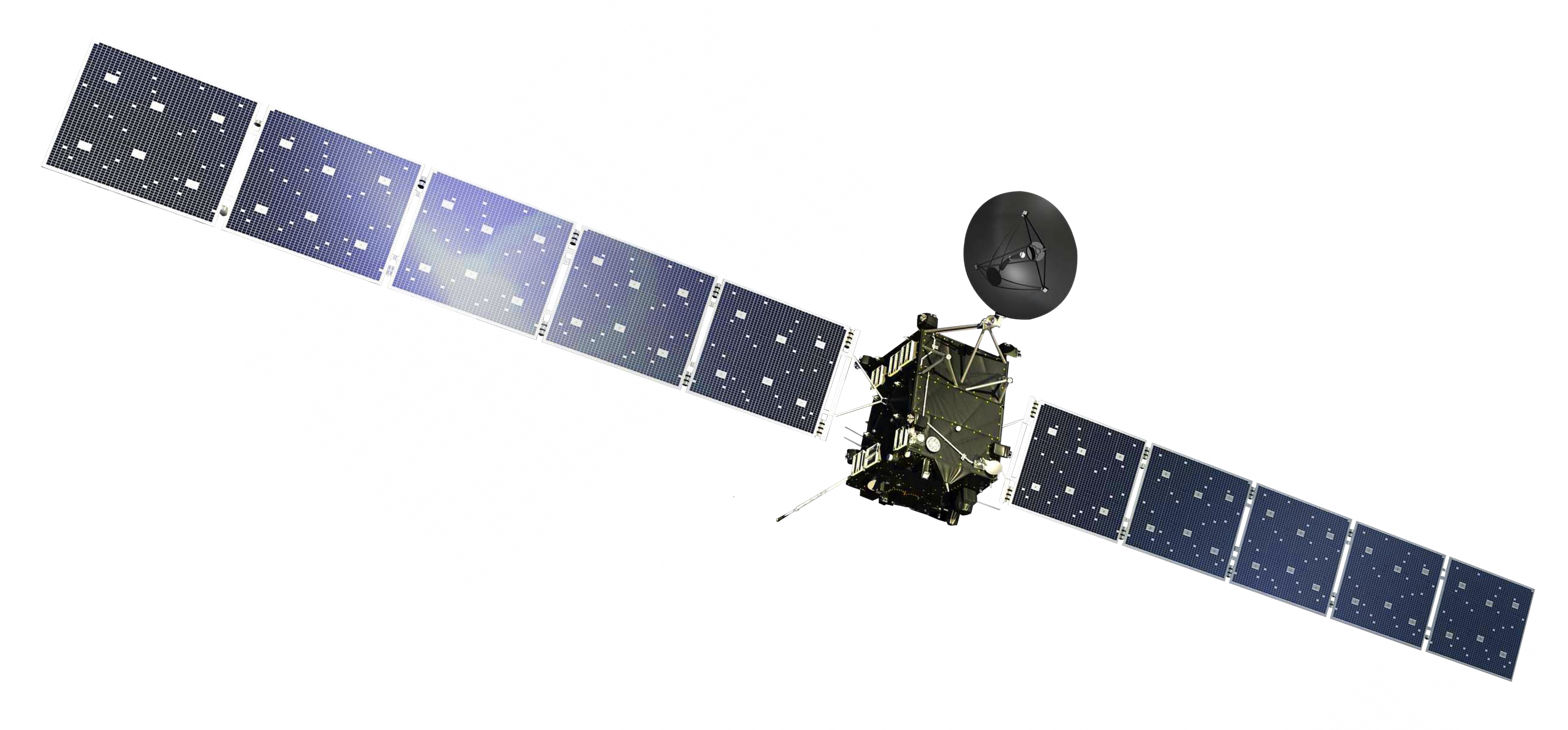
- Artist's illustration of Rosetta
- Mission type: Comet orbiter/lander
- Operator: ESA
- COSPAR ID: 2004-006A
- SATCAT no.: 28169
- Website: esa.int/rosetta
- Mission duration: 12 years, 6 months and 28 days

Spacecraft properties
- Manufacturer: Astrium
- Launch mass: Combined: 3,000 kg (6,600 lb); Orbiter: 2,900 kg (6,400 lb); Lander: 100 kg (220 lb)
- Dry mass: Orbiter: 1,230 kg (2,710 lb)
- Payload mass: Orbiter: 165 kg (364 lb); Lander: 27 kg (60 lb)
- Dimensions: 2.8 × 2.1 × 2 m (9.2 × 6.9 × 6.6 ft)
- Power: 850 watts at 3.4 AU

Start of mission
- Launch date: 2 March 2004, 07:17:51 UTC
- Rocket: Ariane 5G+ V-158
- Launch site: Kourou ELA-3
- Contractor: Arianespace

End of mission
- Disposal: Deorbited
- Last contact: 30 September 2016, 10:39:28 UTC SCET
- Landing site: Sais, Ma'at region 2 years, 55 days of operations at the comet

Flyby of Earth
- Closest approach: 4 March 2005
- Distance: 1,954 km (1,214 mi)

Flyby of Mars
- Closest approach: 25 February 2007
- Distance: 250 km (160 mi)

Flyby of Earth
- Closest approach: 13 November 2007
- Distance: 5,700 km (3,500 mi)

Flyby of 2867 Šteins
- Closest approach: 5 September 2008
- Distance: 800 km (500 mi)

Flyby of Earth
- Closest approach: 12 November 2009
- Distance: 2,481 km (1,542 mi)

Flyby of 21 Lutetia
- Closest approach: 10 July 2010
- Distance: 3,162 km (1,965 mi)

67P/Churyumov–Gerasimenko orbiter
- Spacecraft component: Rosetta
- Orbital insertion: 6 August 2014, 09:06 UTC

Orbital parameters
- Periapsis altitude: 29 km (18 mi)

67P/Churyumov–Gerasimenko lander
- Spacecraft component: Philae
- Landing date: 12 November 2014, 17:32 UTC
- Landing site: Abydos

Transponders
- Band: S band (low gain antenna); X band (high gain antenna)
- Bandwidth: from 7.8-bit/s (S band) up to 91 kbit/s (X band)
Instruments
- Alice: Ultraviolet Imaging Spectrometer
- CONSERT: Comet Nucleus Sounding Experiment by Radio wave Transmission
- COSIMA: Cometary Secondary Ion Mass Spectrometer
- GIADA: Grain Impact Analyser and Dust Accumulator
- MIDAS: Micro-Imaging Dust Analysis System
- MIRO: Microwave Spectrometer for the Rosetta Orbiter
- OSIRIS: Optical, Spectroscopic, and Infrared Remote Imaging System
- ROSINA: Rosetta Orbiter Spectrometer for Ion and Neutral Analysis
- RPC: Rosetta Plasma Consortium
- RSI: Radio Science Investigation
- VIRTIS: Visible and Infrared Thermal Imaging Spectrometer
- Contemporary ESA insignia (2010s) Horizon 2000 (Science Programme)

Rosetta was a space probe built by the European Space Agency that launched on 2 March 2004. Along with Philae, its lander module, Rosetta performed a detailed study of comet 67P/Churyumov–Gerasimenko (67P). During its journey to the comet, the spacecraft performed flybys of Earth, Mars, and the asteroids 21 Lutetia and 2867 Šteins. It was launched as the third cornerstone mission of the ESA's Horizon 2000 programme, after SOHO / Cluster and XMM-Newton. The total cost of the mission was about €1.3 billion (US$1.8 billion).

On 6 August 2014, the spacecraft reached the comet and performed a series of manoeuvers to eventually orbit the comet at distances of 30 to 10 kilometres (19 to 6 mi). On 12 November, its lander module Philae performed the first successful landing on a comet, though its battery power ran out two days later. Communications with Philae were briefly restored in June and July 2015, but due to diminishing solar power, Rosetta's communications module with the lander was turned off on 27 July 2016. On 30 September 2016, the Rosetta spacecraft ended its mission by hard-landing on the comet in its Ma'at region.

== Name ==
The probe was named after the Rosetta Stone, a stele of Egyptian origin featuring a decree in three scripts. The lander was named after the Philae obelisk, which bears a bilingual Greek and Egyptian hieroglyphic inscription. A comparison of its hieroglyphs with those on the Rosetta Stone catalysed the deciphering of the Egyptian writing system. Similarly, it was hoped that these spacecraft would result in better understanding of comets and the early Solar System. In a more direct analogy to its namesake, the Rosetta spacecraft also carried a micro-etched pure nickel prototype of the Rosetta disc donated by the Long Now Foundation. The disc was inscribed with 6,500 pages of language translations.

== Mission overview ==
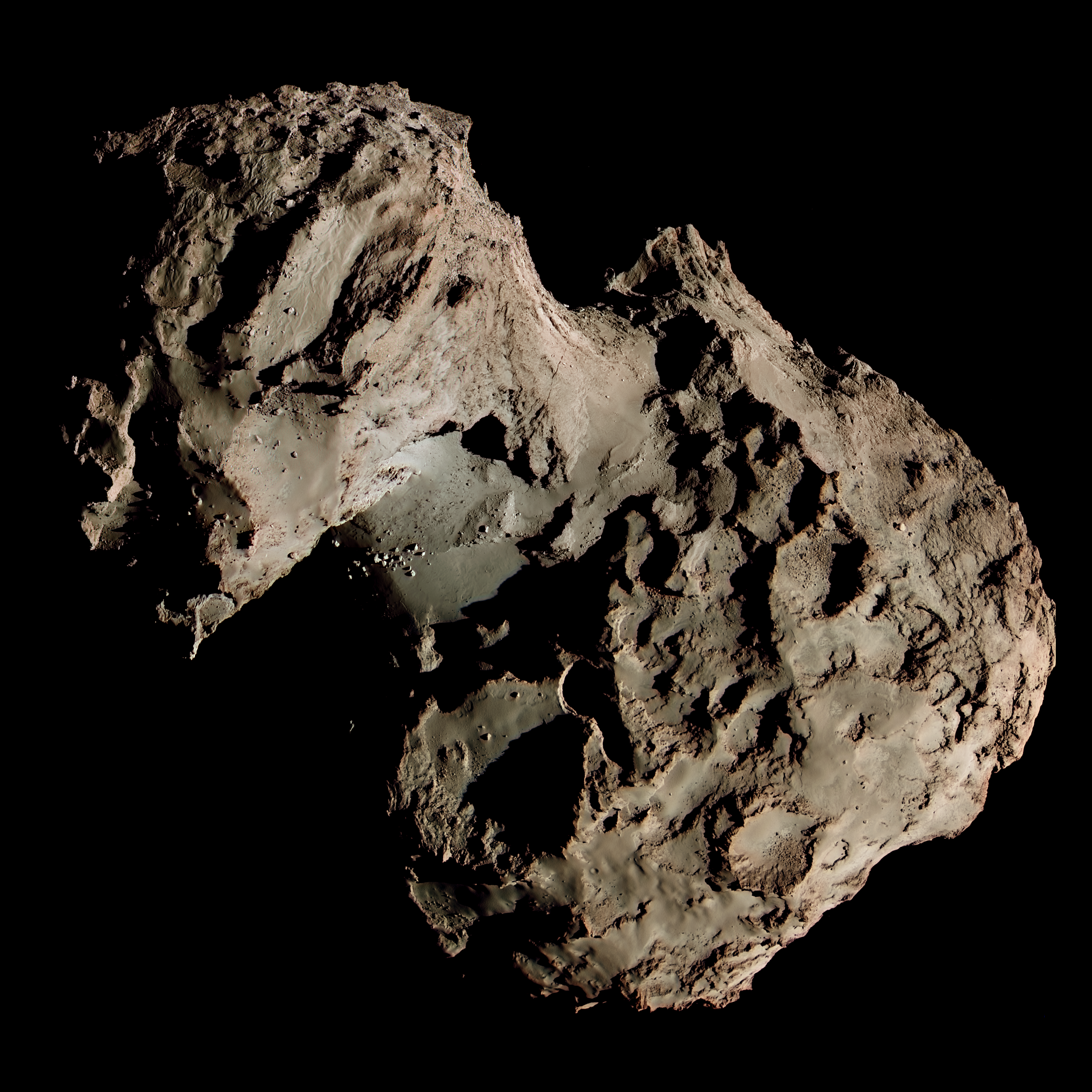
Comet Churyumov–Gerasimenko in March 2015 as imaged by Rosetta, enhanced colour

The spacecraft consisted of the Rosetta orbiter, which featured 12 instruments, and the Philae lander, with nine additional instruments. The Rosetta mission orbited Comet Churyumov–Gerasimenko for 17 months and was designed to complete the most detailed study of a comet ever attempted.

Rosetta was launched on 2 March 2004 from the Guiana Space Centre in Kourou, French Guiana, on an Ariane 5 rocket. In 2007, Rosetta made a Mars gravity assist (flyby). The spacecraft also performed two asteroid flybys: of 2867 Šteins in September 2008 and of 21 Lutetia in July 2010.

Rosetta reached Comet Churyumov–Gerasimenko in May 2014. It performed a series of manoeuvres to enter orbit between then and 6 August 2014, when it became the first spacecraft to orbit a comet. Rosetta's Philae lander successfully made the first soft landing on a comet nucleus when it touched down on Comet Churyumov–Gerasimenko on 12 November 2014.

== Mission firsts ==
The Rosetta mission achieved many historic firsts. On its way to comet 67P, Rosetta passed through the main asteroid belt, and made the first European close encounter with several of these primitive objects. Rosetta was the first spacecraft to fly close to Jupiter's orbit using solar cells as its main power source. Rosetta was the first spacecraft to orbit a comet nucleus, and was the first spacecraft to fly alongside a comet as it headed towards the inner Solar System. Previous missions had conducted successful flybys of seven other comets. It became the first spacecraft to examine at close proximity the activity of a frozen comet as it is warmed by the Sun. Shortly after its arrival at 67P, the Rosetta orbiter dispatched the Philae lander for the first controlled touchdown on a comet nucleus. The robotic lander's instruments obtained the first images from a comet's surface and made the first on-site analysis of its composition.

== History ==
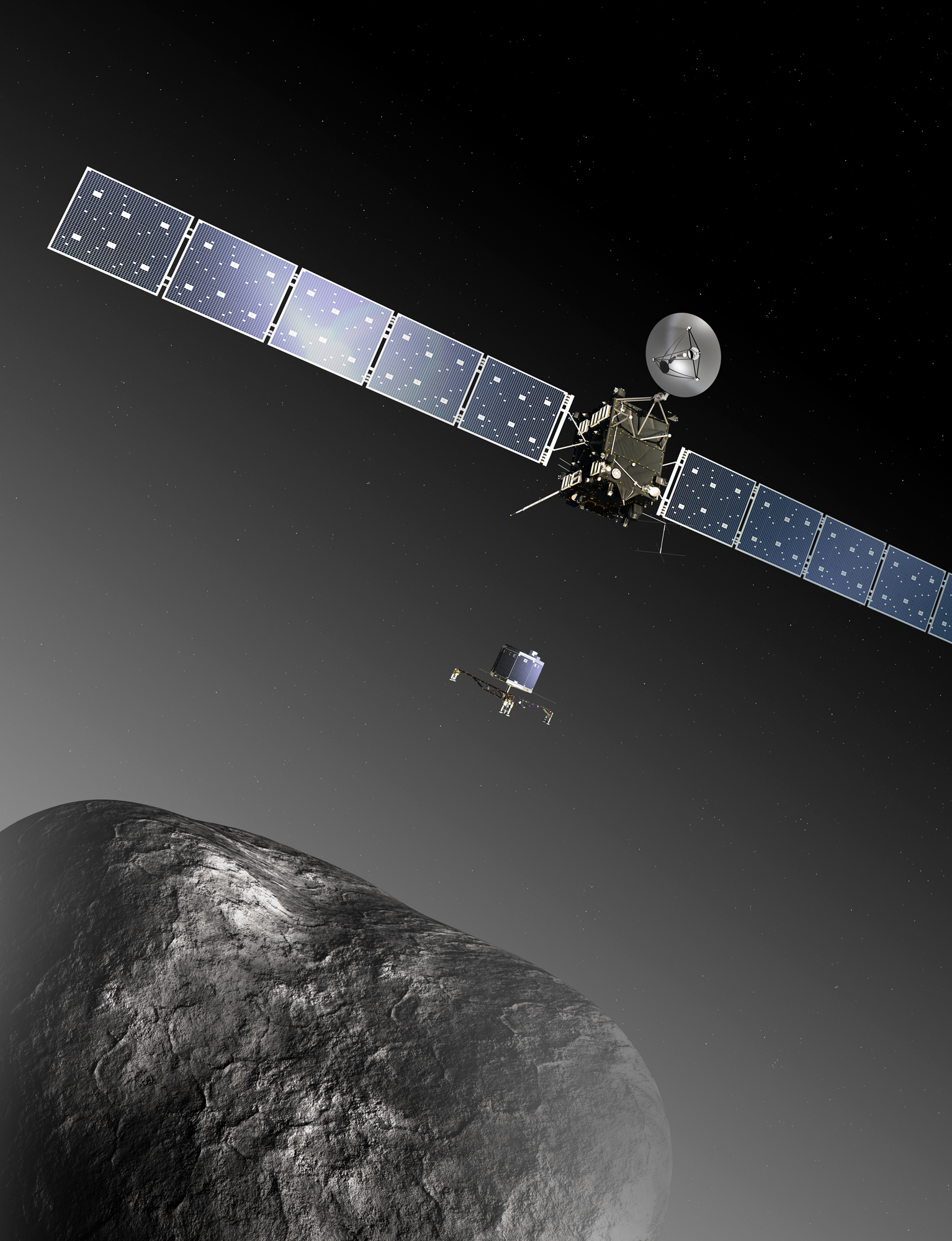
Illustration of Rosetta and Philae at the comet

=== Background ===
During the 1986 approach of Halley's Comet, international space probes were sent to explore the comet, most prominent among them being ESA's Giotto. After the probes returned valuable scientific information, it became obvious that follow-ons were needed that would shed more light on cometary composition and answer new questions.

Both ESA and NASA started cooperatively developing new probes. The NASA project was the Comet Rendezvous Asteroid Flyby (CRAF) mission. The ESA project was the follow-on Comet Nucleus Sample Return (CNSR) mission. Both missions were to share the Mariner Mark II spacecraft design, thus minimising costs. In 1992, after NASA cancelled CRAF due to budgetary limitations, ESA decided to develop a CRAF-style project on its own. By 1993 it was evident that the ambitious sample return mission was infeasible with the existing ESA budget, so the mission was redesigned and subsequently approved by the ESA, with the final flight plan resembling the cancelled CRAF mission: an asteroid flyby followed by a comet rendezvous with in-situ examination, including a lander. After the spacecraft launch, Gerhard Schwehm was named mission manager; he retired in March 2014.

The Rosetta mission included generational team management; this allowed mission continuity over the long period of the mission and for special knowledge to be maintained and passed on to future team members. In particular, several younger scientists were brought on as principal science investigators, and regular training sessions were conducted.

The spacecraft was controlled from the European Space Operations Centre (ESOC), in Darmstadt, Germany. The planning for the operation of the scientific payload, together with the data retrieval, calibration, archiving and distribution, was performed from the European Space Astronomy Centre (ESAC), in Villanueva de la Cañada, near Madrid, Spain. It has been estimated that in the decade preceding 2014, some 2,000 people assisted in the mission in some capacity.

Rosetta was built in a clean room according to COSPAR rules, but "sterilisation [was] generally not crucial since comets are usually regarded as objects where you can find prebiotic molecules, that is, molecules that are precursors of life, but not living microorganisms", according to Gerhard Schwehm, Rosetta's project scientist.

Rosetta was set to be launched on 12 January 2003 to rendezvous with the comet 46P/Wirtanen in 2011. This plan was abandoned after the failure of an Ariane 5 ECA carrier rocket during Hot Bird 7's launch on 11 December 2002, grounding it until the cause of the failure could be determined. In May 2003, a new plan was formed to target the comet 67P/Churyumov–Gerasimenko, with a revised launch date of 26 February 2004 and comet rendezvous in 2014. The larger mass and the resulting increased impact velocity made modification of the landing gear necessary.

=== Launch ===
After two scrubbed launch attempts, Rosetta was launched on 2 March 2004 at 07:17 UTC from the Guiana Space Centre in French Guiana, using Ariane 5 G+ carrier rocket. Aside from the changes made to launch time and target, the mission profile remained almost identical. Both co-discoverers of the comet, Klim Churyumov and Svetlana Gerasimenko, were present at the spaceport during the launch.

=== Deep space manoeuvres ===
Animation of Rosetta's trajectory from 2 March 2004 to 9 September 2016 Rosetta · 67P/Churyumov–Gerasimenko · Earth · Mars · 21 Lutetia · 2867 Šteins

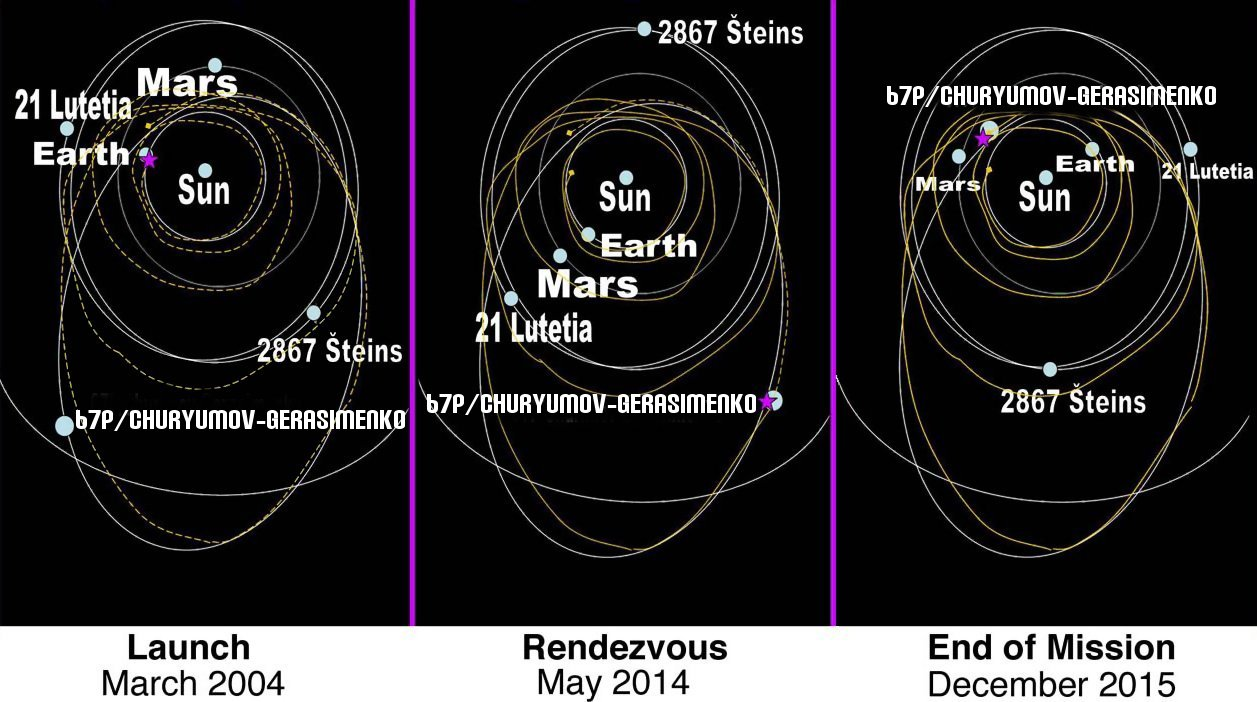
Trajectory of the Rosetta space probe

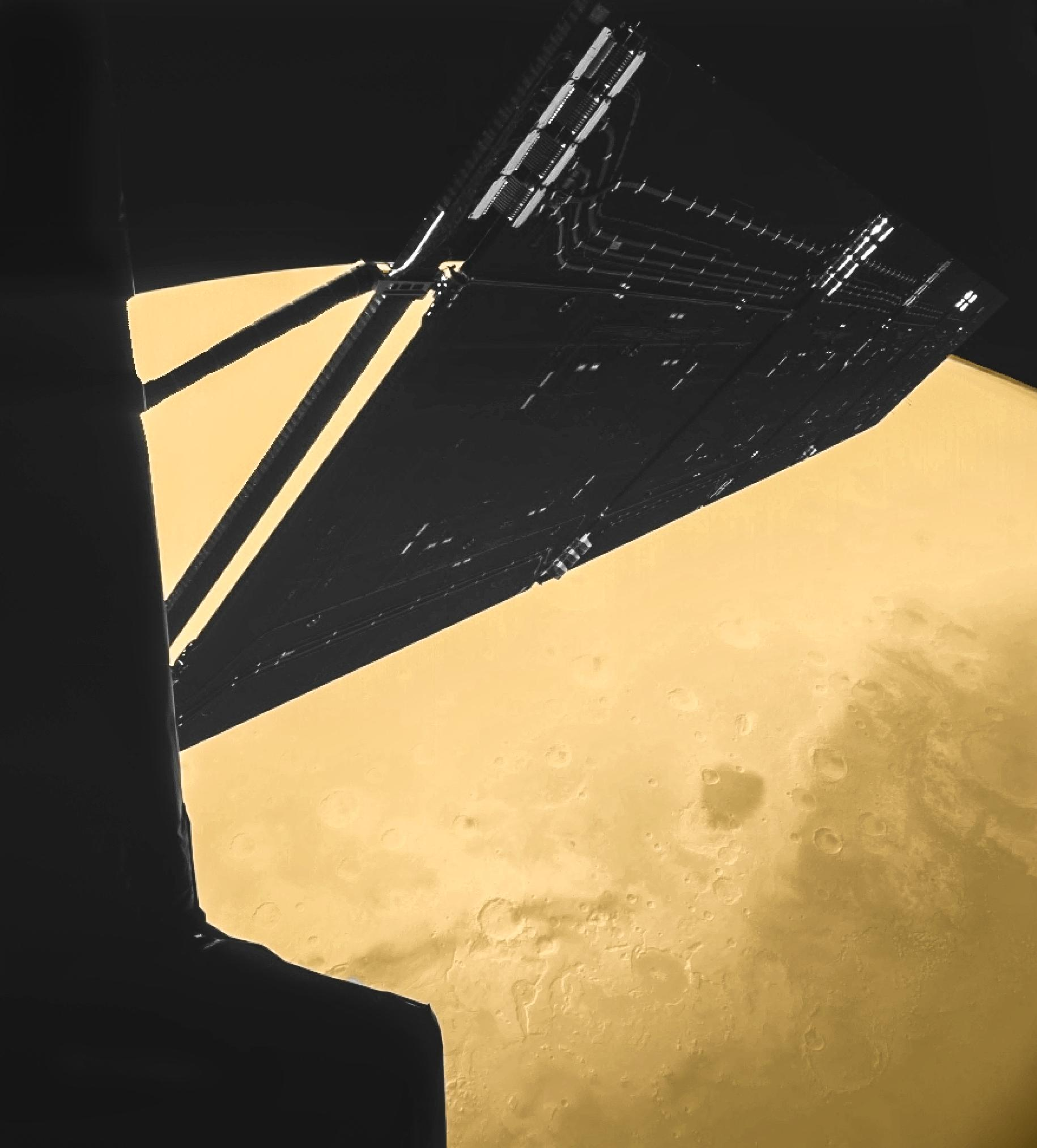
Rosetta "selfie" at Mars

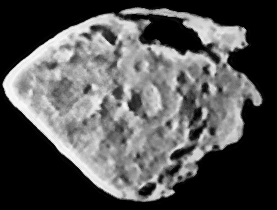
Enhanced image of asteroid Šteins by Rosetta

To achieve the required velocity to rendezvous with 67P, Rosetta used gravity assist manoeuvres to accelerate throughout the inner Solar System. The comet's orbit was known before Rosetta's launch, from ground-based measurements, to an accuracy of approximately 100 km (62 mi). Information gathered by the onboard cameras beginning at a distance of 24 million kilometres (15,000,000 mi) were processed at ESA's Operation Centre to refine the position of the comet in its orbit to a few kilometres. The first Earth flyby was on 4 March 2005.

On 4 July 2005, imaging instruments on board observed the collision between the comet Tempel 1 and the impactor of the Deep Impact mission.

On 25 February 2007, the craft was scheduled for a low-altitude flyby of Mars, to correct the trajectory. This was not without risk, as the estimated altitude of the flyby was a mere 250 kilometres (160 mi). During that encounter, the solar panels could not be used since the craft was in the planet's shadow, where it would not receive any solar light for 15 minutes, causing a dangerous shortage of power. The craft was therefore put into standby mode, with no possibility to communicate, flying on batteries that were originally not designed for this task. This Mars manoeuvre was therefore nicknamed "The Billion Euro Gamble". The flyby was successful, with Rosetta even returning detailed images of the surface and atmosphere of the planet, and the mission continued as planned.

The second Earth flyby was on 13 November 2007 at a distance of 5,700 km (3,500 mi). In observations made on 7 and 8 November, Rosetta was briefly mistaken for a near-Earth asteroid about 20 m (66 ft) in diameter by an astronomer of the Catalina Sky Survey and was given the provisional designation 2007 VN_{84}. Calculations showed that it would pass very close to Earth, which led to speculation that it could impact Earth. However, astronomer Denis Denisenko recognised that the trajectory matched that of Rosetta, which the Minor Planet Center confirmed in an editorial release on 9 November.

The spacecraft performed a close flyby of asteroid 2867 Šteins on 5 September 2008. Its onboard cameras were used to fine-tune the trajectory, achieving a minimum separation of less than 800 km (500 mi). Onboard instruments measured the asteroid from 4 August to 10 September. Maximum relative speed between the two objects during the flyby was 8.6 km/s (19,000 mph; 31,000 km/h).

Rosetta's third and final flyby of Earth happened on 12 November 2009 at a distance of 2,481 km (1,542 mi).

On 16 March 2010, Rosetta performed observations of the dust tail of the object P/2010 A2. Together with observations by Hubble Space Telescope, it helped to confirm that P/2010 A2 is not a comet, but an asteroid, and that the tail most likely consists of particles from an impact by a smaller asteroid.

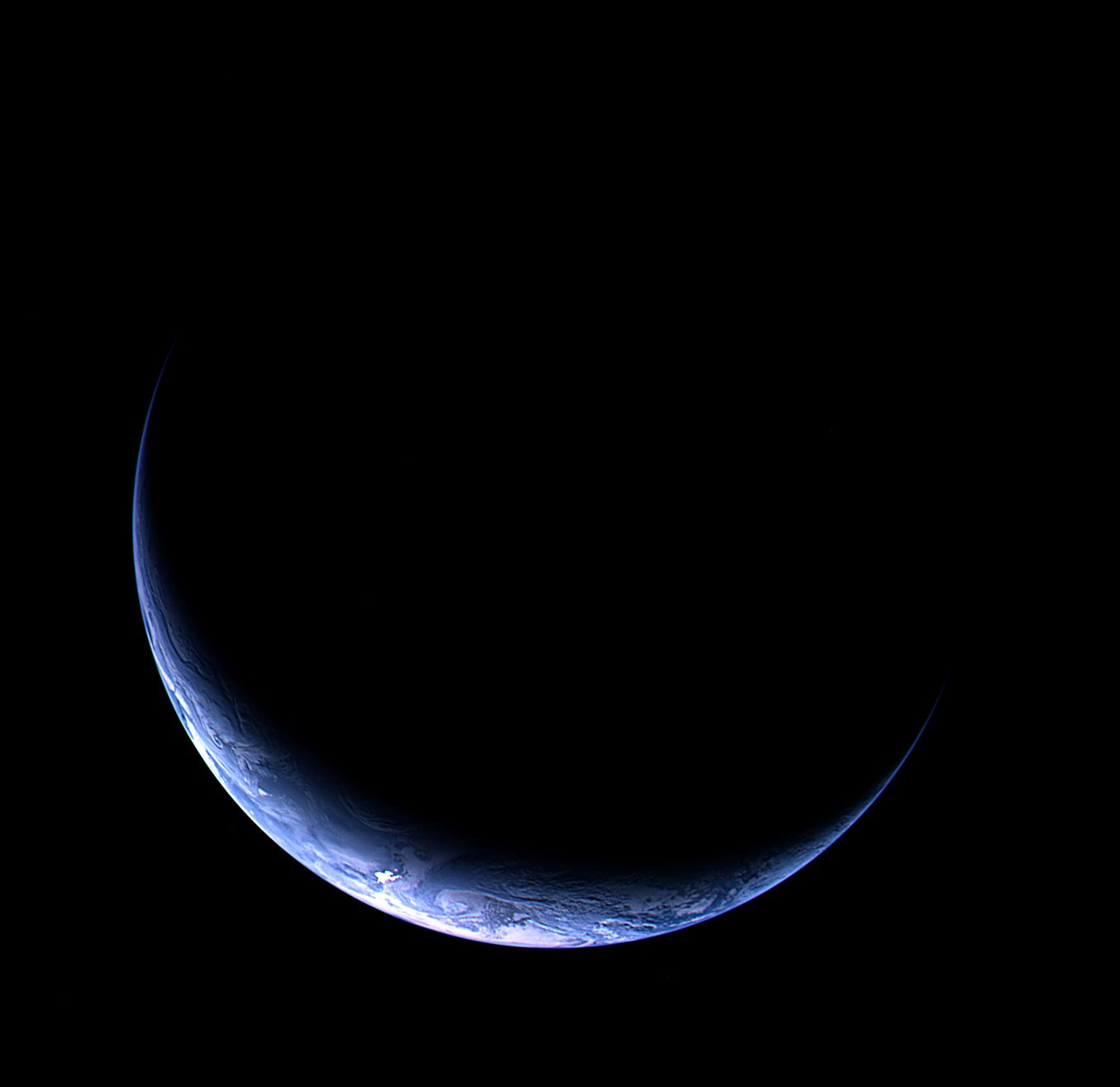
Earth from Rosetta during final flyby

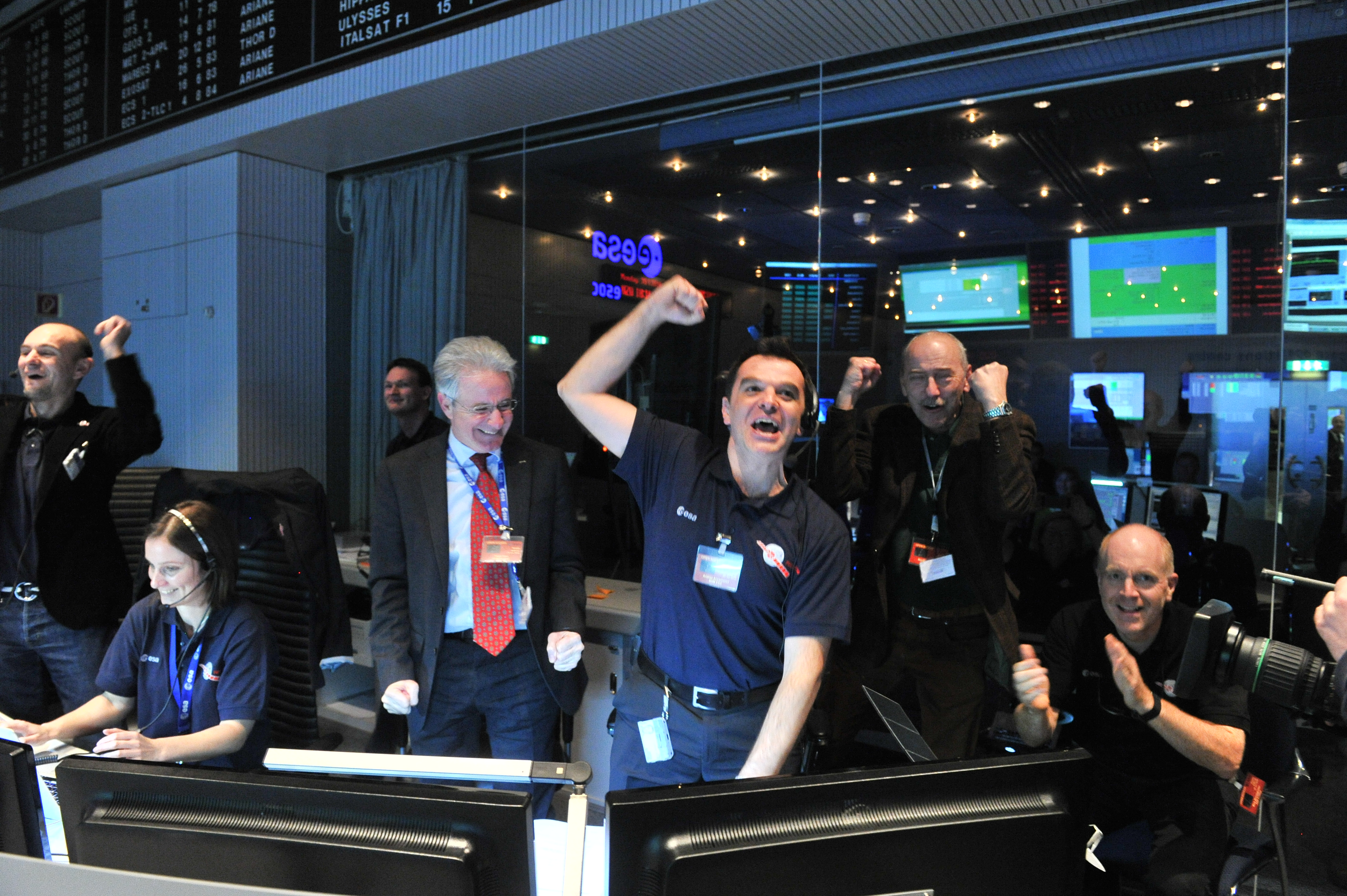
Joy from receiving first signals from Rosetta after waking up on 20 January 2014.

On 10 July 2010, Rosetta flew by 21 Lutetia, a large main-belt asteroid, at a minimum distance of 3,168±7.5 km (1,969±4.7 mi) at a velocity of 15 kilometres per second (9.3 mi/s). The flyby provided images of up to 60 metres (200 ft) per pixel resolution and covered about 50% of the surface, mostly in the northern hemisphere. The 462 images were obtained in 21 narrow- and broad-band filters extending from 0.24 to 1 μm. Lutetia was also observed by the visible–near-infrared imaging spectrometer VIRTIS, and measurements of the magnetic field and plasma environment were taken as well.

On 8 June 2011, the spacecraft was transferred into a spin stabilised mode and all electronics except the onboard computer and the hibernation heaters were switched off for the planned 31 months of hibernation. After leaving its hibernation mode in January 2014 and getting closer to the comet, Rosetta began a series of eight burns in May 2014. These reduced the relative velocity between the spacecraft and 67P from 775 to 7.9 m/s (2,543 to 26 ft/s).

=== Reaction control system problems ===
In 2006, Rosetta suffered a leak in its reaction control system (RCS). The system, which consists of 24 bipropellant 10-newton thrusters, was responsible for fine tuning the trajectory of Rosetta throughout its journey. The RCS operated at a lower pressure than designed due to the leak. While this may have caused the propellants to mix incompletely and burn 'dirtier' and less efficiently, ESA engineers were confident that the spacecraft would have sufficient fuel reserves to allow for the successful completion of the mission.

Prior to Rosetta's deep space hibernation period, two of the spacecraft's four reaction wheels began exhibiting increased levels of "bearing friction noise". Increased friction levels in Reaction Wheel Assembly (RWA) B were noted after its September 2008 encounter with asteroid Šteins. Two attempts were made to relubricate the RWA using an on-board oil reservoir, but in each case noise levels were only temporarily lowered, and the RWA was turned off in mid-2010 after the flyby of asteroid Lutetia to avoid possible failure. Shortly after this, RWA C also began showing evidence of elevated friction. Relubrication was also performed on this RWA, and methods were found to temporarily increase its operating temperature to better improve the transfer of oil from its reservoir. In addition, the reaction wheel's speed range was decreased to limit lifetime accumulated rotations. These changes resulted in RWA C's performance stabilising.

During the spacecraft's Deep Space Hibernation flight phase, engineers performed ground testing on a flight spare RWA at the European Space Operations Centre. After Rosetta exited hibernation in January 2014, lessons learned from the ground testing were applied to all four RWAs, such as increasing their operating temperatures and limiting their wheel speeds to below 1000 rpm. After these fixes, the RWAs showed nearly identical performance data. Three RWAs were kept operational, while one of the malfunctioning RWAs was held in reserve. Additionally, new on-board software was developed to allow Rosetta to operate with only two active RWAs if necessary. These changes allowed the four RWAs to operate throughout Rosetta's mission at 67P/Churyumov–Gerasimenko despite occasional anomalies in their friction plots and a heavy workload imposed by numerous orbital changes.

=== Orbit around 67P ===
Animation of Rosetta's trajectory around 67P from 1 August 2014 to 31 March 2015 Rosetta · 67P

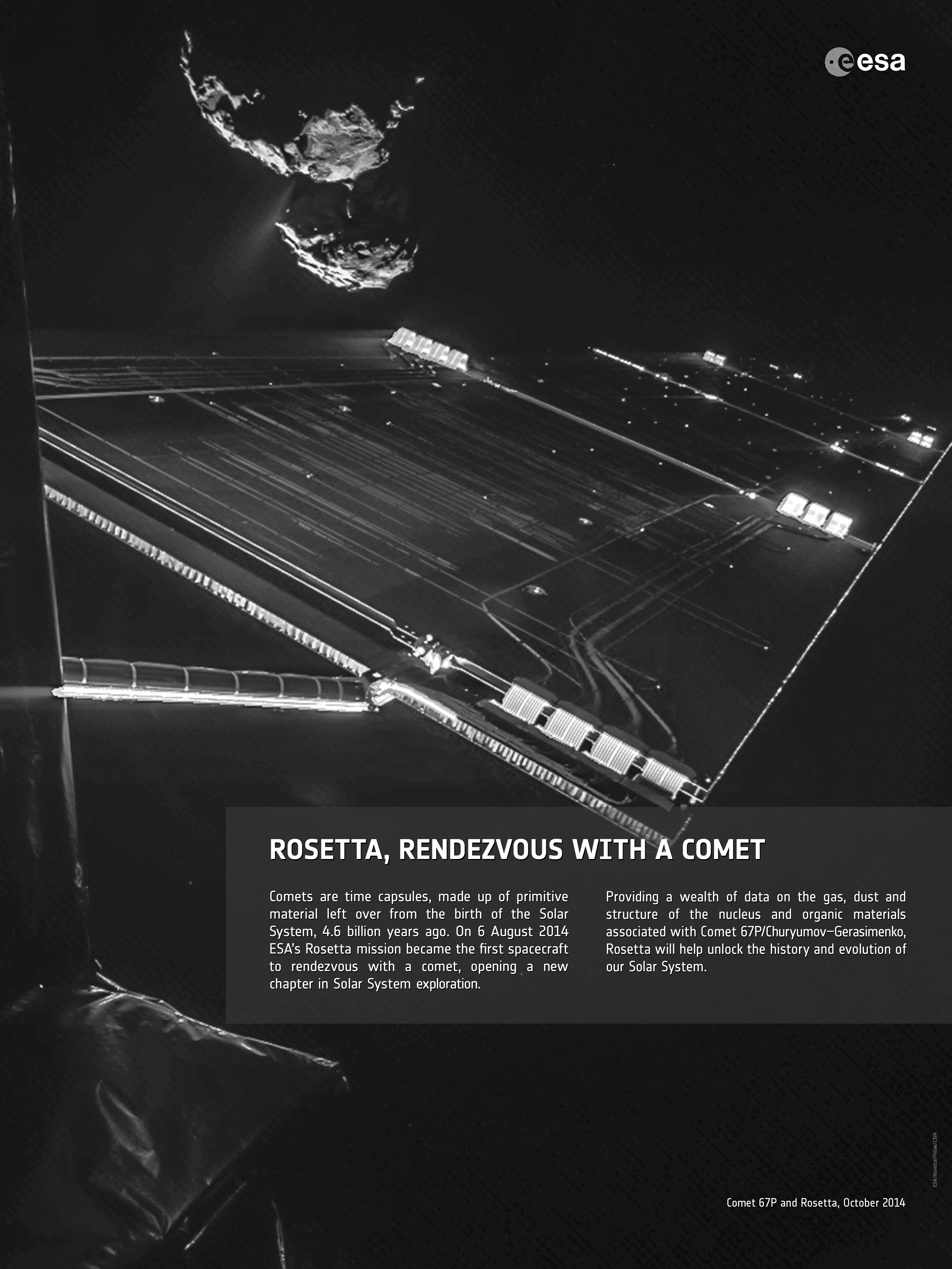
Rosetta rendezvous with a comet

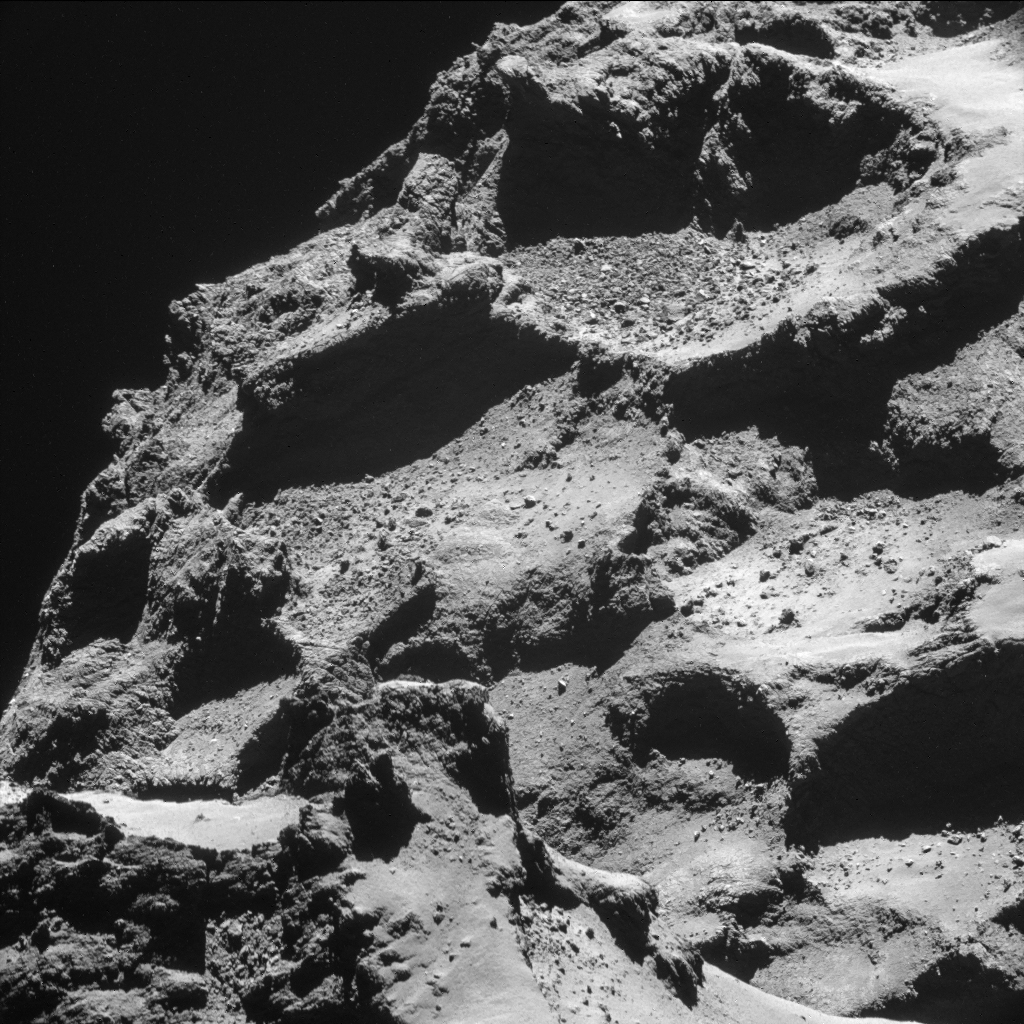
Comet 67P seen from 10 km (6 mi)

Starting on 7 May 2014, Rosetta began orbital correction manoeuvres to bring itself into orbit around 67P. At the time of the first deceleration burn Rosetta was approximately 2,000,000 km (1,200,000 mi) away from 67P and had a relative velocity of +775 m/s (2,540 ft/s); by the end of the last burn, which occurred on 23 July, the distance had been reduced to just over 4,000 km (2,500 mi) with a relative velocity of +7.9 m/s (18 mph). In total eight burns were used to align the trajectories of Rosetta 67P with the majority of the deceleration occurring during three burns: Delta-v's of 291 m/s (650 mph) on 21 May, 271 m/s (610 mph) on 4 June, and 91 m/s (200 mph) on 18 June.

In August 2014, Rosetta rendezvoused with the comet 67P/Churyumov–Gerasimenko (67P) and commenced a series of manoeuvres that took it on two successive triangular paths, averaging 100 and 50 kilometres (62 and 31 mi) from the nucleus, whose segments are hyperbolic escape trajectories alternating with thruster burns. After closing to within about 30 km (19 mi) from the comet on 10 September, the spacecraft entered actual orbit about it. This started the Global Mapping Phase.

The surface layout of 67P was unknown before Rosetta's arrival. The orbiter mapped the comet in anticipation of detaching its lander. On 14 July 2014, the OSIRIS on-board imaging system returned images of the comet which confirmed its irregular shape. By 25 August 2014, five potential landing sites had been determined. On 15 September 2014, ESA announced Site J, named Agilkia in honour of Agilkia Island by an ESA public contest and located on the "head" of the comet, as the lander's destination.

=== Philae lander ===
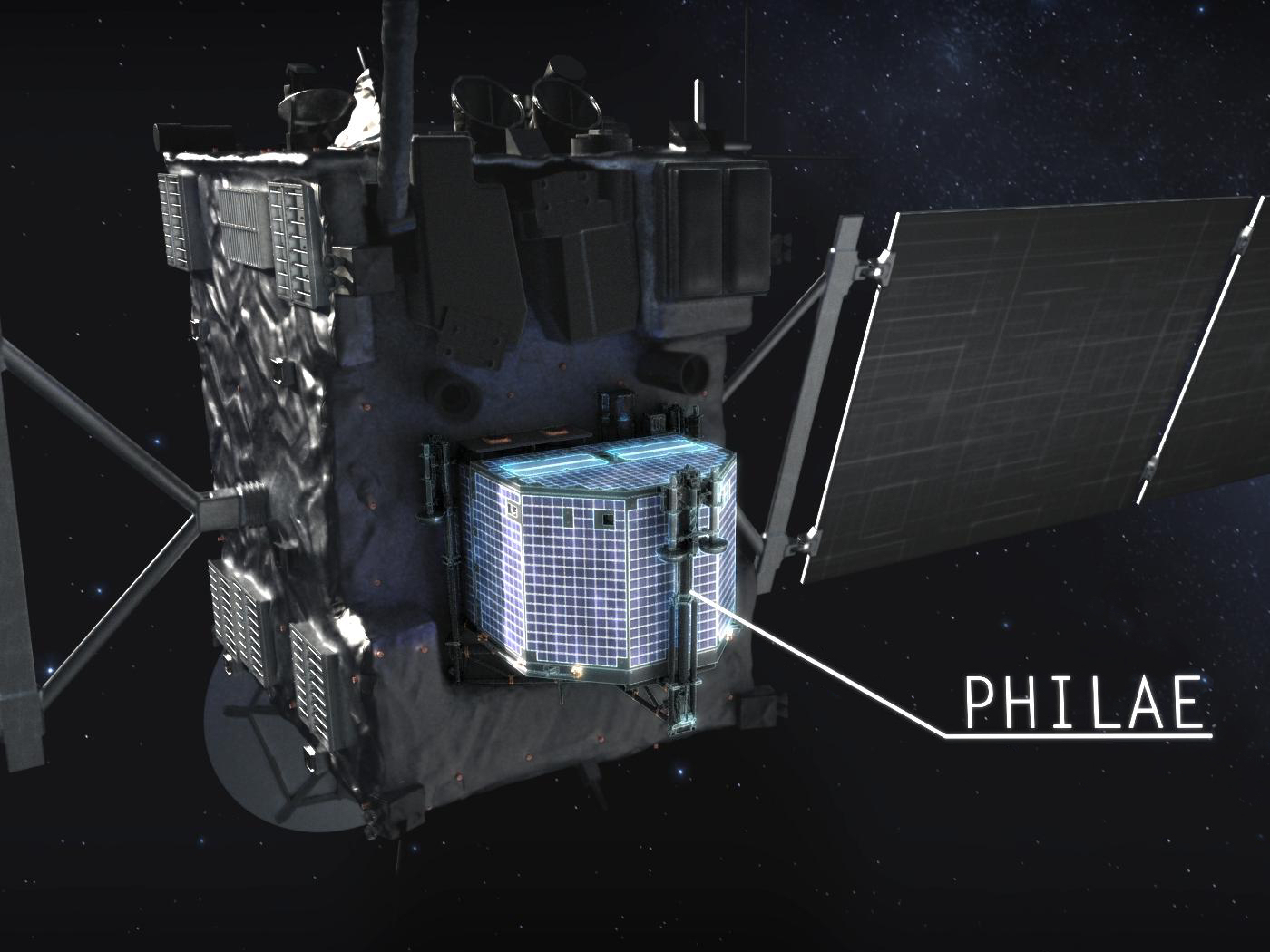
Rosetta and Philae

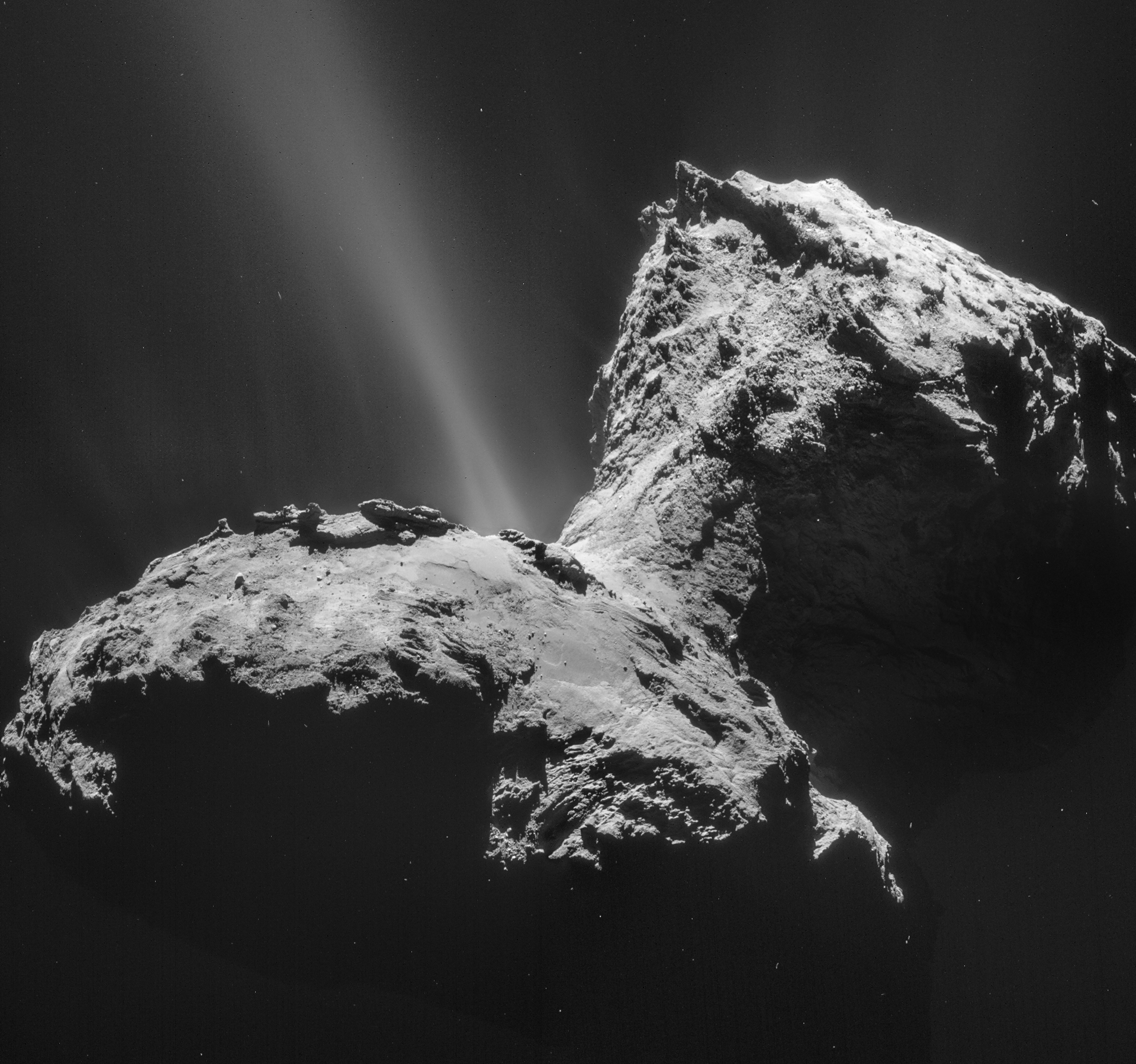
The comet in January 2015 as seen by Rosetta's NAVCAM

Outbursting of the comet 67P/Churyumov–Gerasimenko on 12 September 2015 one of the most dramatic cliff collapses captured during the Rosetta mission.

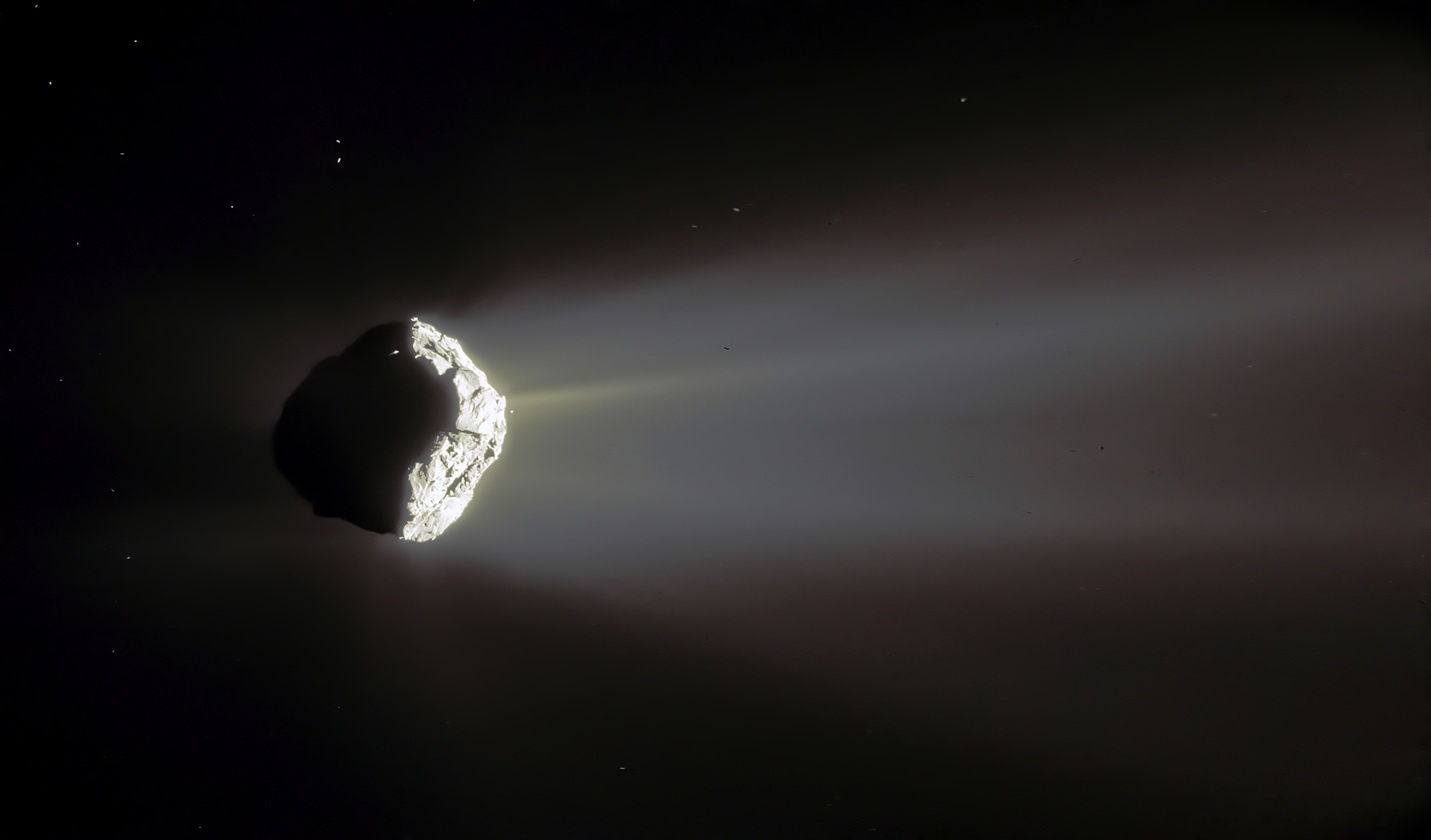
Comet 67P with a tail of gas and dust, seen from 162 km (101 mi)

Philae detached from Rosetta on 12 November 2014 at 08:35 UTC, and approached 67P at a relative speed of about 1 m/s (3.6 km/h; 2.2 mph). It initially landed on 67P at 15:33 UTC, but bounced twice, coming to rest at 17:33 UTC. Confirmation of contact with 67P reached Earth at 16:03 UTC.

On contact with the surface, two harpoons were to be fired into the comet to prevent the lander from bouncing off, as the comet's escape velocity is only around 1 m/s (3.6 km/h; 2.2 mph). Analysis of telemetry indicated that the surface at the initial touchdown site is relatively soft, covered with a layer of granular material about 0.82 feet (0.25 meters) deep, and that the harpoons had not fired upon landing. After landing on the comet, Philae had been scheduled to commence its science mission, which included:

- Characterisation of the nucleus
- Determination of the chemical compounds present, including amino acid enantiomers
- Study of comet activities and developments over time

After bouncing, Philae settled in the shadow of a cliff, canted at an angle of around 30 degrees. This made it unable to adequately collect solar power, and it lost contact with Rosetta when its batteries ran out after three days, well before much of the planned science objectives could be attempted. Contact was briefly and intermittently reestablished several months later at various times between 13 June and 9 July, before contact was lost once again. There was no communication afterwards, and the transmitter to communicate with Philae was switched off in July 2016 to reduce power consumption of the probe. The precise location of the lander was discovered in September 2016 when Rosetta came closer to the comet and took high-resolution pictures of its surface. Knowing its exact location provides information needed to put Philae's two days of science into proper context.

=== End of mission ===
Between November 2014 and December 2015, Rosetta escorted the comet around the Sun and performed riskier investigations. As the orbit of comet 67P took it farther from the Sun, the amount of sunlight reaching Rosetta's solar panels decreased. While it would have been possible to put Rosetta into a second hibernation phase during the comet's aphelion, there was no assurance that enough power would be available to run the spacecraft's heaters to keep it from freezing. To guarantee a maximum science return, mission managers made the decision to instead guide Rosetta down to the comet's surface and end the mission on impact, gathering photographs and instrument readings along the way. On 23 June 2015, at the same time as a mission extension was confirmed, ESA announced that end of mission would occur at the end of September 2016 after two years of operations at the comet.

All stations and the briefing room, we've just had loss of signal at the expected time. This is another outstanding performance by flight dynamics. So we'll be listening for the signal from Rosetta for another 24 hours, but we don't expect any. This is the end of the Rosetta mission. Thank you, and goodbye.
—Sylvain Lodiot, Rosetta Spacecraft Operations Manager, European Space Operations Centre

Rosetta began a 19 km (12 mi) descent with a 208-second thruster burn executed on 29 September 2016 at approximately 20:50 UTC. Its trajectory targeted a site in the Ma'at region near an area of dust- and gas-producing active pits.

Impact on the comet's surface occurred 14.5 hours after its descent manoeuvre; the final data packet from Rosetta was transmitted at 10:39:28.895 UTC (SCET) by the OSIRIS instrument and was received at the European Space Operations Centre in Darmstadt, Germany, at 11:19:36.541 UTC. The spacecraft's estimated speed at the time of impact was 3.2 km/h (2.0 mph; 89 cm/s), and its touchdown location, named Sais by the operations team after the Rosetta Stone's original temple home, is believed to be only 40 m (130 ft) off-target. The final complete image transmitted by the spacecraft of the comet was taken by its OSIRIS instrument at an altitude of 23.3–26.2 m (76–86 ft) about 10 seconds before impact, showing an area 0.96 m (3.1 ft) across. Rosetta's computer included commands to send it into safe mode upon detecting that it had hit the comet's surface, turning off its radio transmitter and rendering it inert in accordance with International Telecommunication Union rules.

On 28 September 2017, a previously unrecovered image taken by the spacecraft was reported. This image was recovered from three data packets discovered on a server after completion of the mission. While blurry due to data loss, it shows an area of the comet's surface approximately one square meter in size taken from an altitude of 17.9–21.0 m (58.7–68.9 ft), and represents Rosetta's closest image of the surface.

== Spacecraft ==
The Rosetta bus was a 2.8 × 2.1 × 2.0 m (9.2 × 6.9 × 6.6 ft) central frame and aluminium honeycomb platform. Its total mass was approximately 3,000 kg (6,600 lb), which included the 100 kg (220 lb) Philae lander and 165 kg (364 lb) of science instruments. The Payload Support Module was mounted on top of the spacecraft and housed the scientific instruments, while the Bus Support Module was on the bottom and contained spacecraft support subsystems. Heaters placed around the spacecraft kept its systems warm while it was distant from the Sun. Rosetta's communications suite included a 2.2 m (7.2 ft) steerable high-gain parabolic dish antenna, a 0.8 m (2.6 ft) fixed-position medium-gain antenna, and two omnidirectional low-gain antennas. The high-gain antenna also had the ESA logo printed on the reflector as a form of branding to let people clearly identify it as project from the European Space Agency (ESA)

Electrical power for the spacecraft came from two solar arrays totalling 64 square metres (690 sq ft). Each solar array was subdivided into five solar panels, with each panel being 2.25 × 2.736 m (7.38 × 8.98 ft). The individual solar cells were made of silicon, 200 μm thick, and 61.95 × 37.75 mm (2.44 × 1.49 in). The solar arrays generated a maximum of approximately 1,500 watts at perihelion, a minimum of 400 watts in hibernation mode at 5.2 AU, and 850 watts when comet operations begin at 3.4 AU. Spacecraft power was controlled by a redundant Terma power module also used in the Mars Express spacecraft, and was stored in four 10-A·h [Li-ion] batteries supplying 28 volts to the bus.

Main propulsion comprised 24 paired bipropellant 10 N thrusters, with four pairs of thrusters being used for delta-v burns. The spacecraft carried 1,719.1 kg (3,790 lb) of propellant at launch: 659.6 kg (1,454 lb) of monomethylhydrazine fuel and 1,059.5 kg (2,336 lb) of dinitrogen tetroxide oxidiser, contained in two 1,108-litre (244 imp gal; 293 US gal) grade 5 titanium alloy tanks and providing delta-v of at least 2,300 metres per second (7,500 ft/s) over the course of the mission. Propellant pressurisation was provided by two 68-litre (15 imp gal; 18 US gal) high-pressure helium tanks.

== Instruments ==
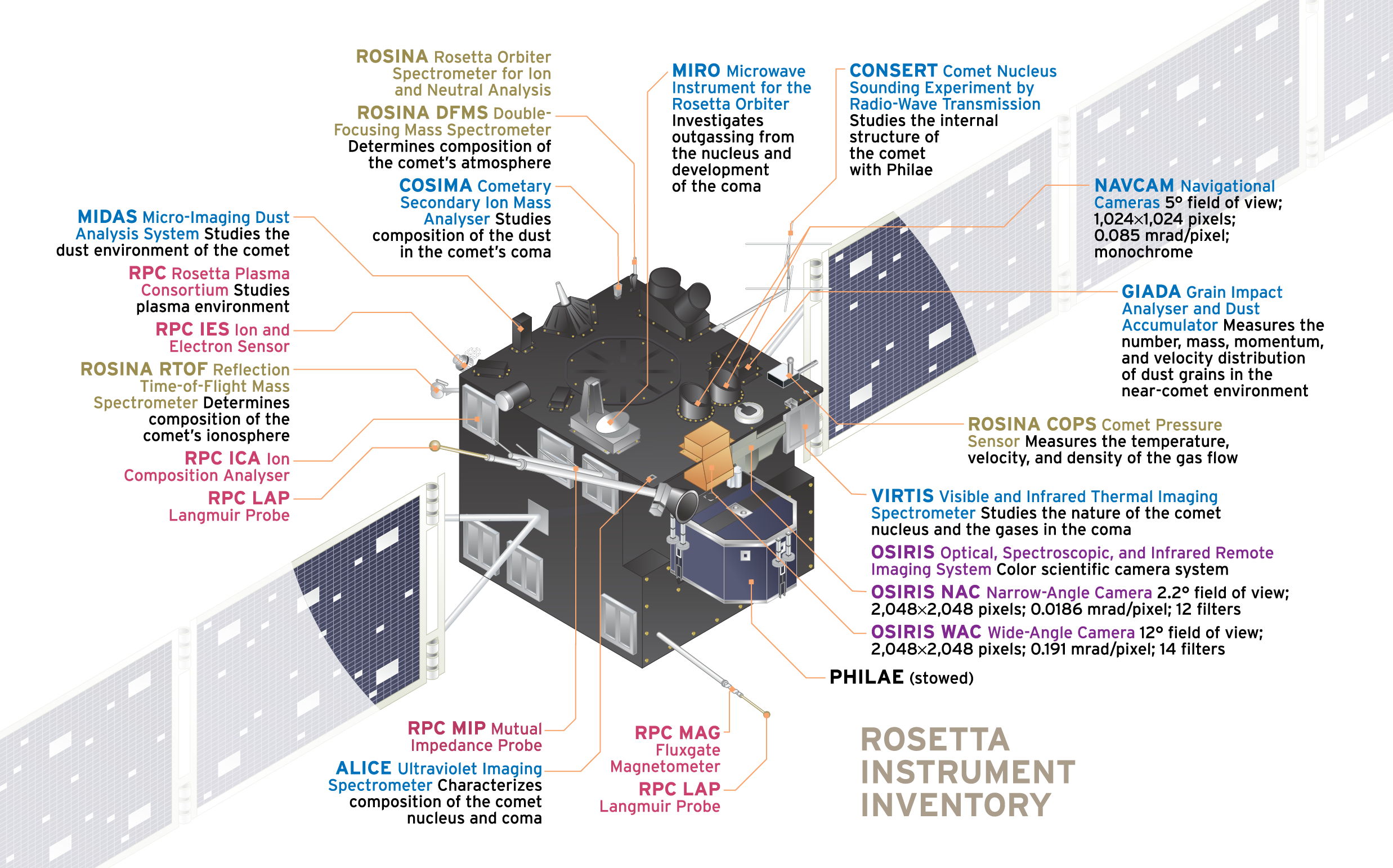
Rosetta instrument inventory

=== Nucleus ===
The investigation of the nucleus was done by three optical spectrometers, one microwave radio antenna and one radar:

- Alice (an ultraviolet imaging spectrograph). The ultraviolet spectrograph searched for and quantified the noble gas content in the comet nucleus, from which the temperature during the comet creation could be estimated. The detection was done by an array of potassium bromide and caesium iodide photocathodes. The 3.1 kg (6.8 lb) instrument used 2.9 watts, with an improved version onboard New Horizons. It operated in the extreme and far ultraviolet spectrum, from 700–2,050 Å (70–205 nm). ALICE was built and operated by the Southwest Research Institute for NASA's Jet Propulsion Laboratory.
- OSIRIS (Optical, Spectroscopic, and Infrared Remote Imaging System). The camera system had a narrow-angle lens (700 mm) and a wide-angle lens (140 mm), with a 2048×2048 pixel CCD chip. The instrument was constructed in Germany. Development and construction of the instrument was led by the Max Planck Institute for Solar System Research (MPS).
- VIRTIS (Visible and Infrared Thermal Imaging Spectrometer). The Visible and IR spectrometer was able to make pictures of the nucleus in the IR and also search for IR spectra of molecules in the coma. The detection was done by a mercury cadmium telluride array for IR and with a CCD chip for the visible wavelength range. The instrument was produced in Italy, and improved versions were used for Dawn and Venus Express.
- MIRO (Microwave Instrument for the Rosetta Orbiter). The abundance and temperature of volatile substances like water, ammonia and carbon dioxide could be detected by MIRO via their microwave emissions. The 30 cm (12 in) radio antenna along with the rest of the 18.5 kg (41 lb) instrument was built by NASA's Jet Propulsion Laboratory with international contributions by the Max Planck Institute for Solar System Research (MPS), among others.
- CONSERT (Comet Nucleus Sounding Experiment by Radiowave Transmission). The CONSERT experiment provided information about the deep interior of the comet using radar. The radar performed tomography of the nucleus by measuring electromagnetic wave propagation between the Philae lander and the Rosetta orbiter through the comet nucleus. This allowed it to determine the comet's internal structure and deduce information on its composition. The electronics were developed by France and both antennas were constructed in Germany. Development was led by the Laboratoire de Planétologie de Grenoble with contributions by the Ruhr-Universität Boch and the Max Planck Institute for Solar System Research (MPS).
- RSI (Radio Science Investigation). RSI made use of the probe's communication system for physical investigation of the nucleus and the inner coma of the comet.

=== Gas and particles ===
- ROSINA (Rosetta Orbiter Spectrometer for Ion and Neutral Analysis). The instrument consisted of a double-focus magnetic mass spectrometer (DFMS) and a reflectron type time of flight mass spectrometer (RTOF). The DFMS had a high resolution (could resolve N_{2} from CO) for molecules up to 300 Da. The RTOF was highly sensitive for neutral molecules and for ions. The Max Planck Institute for Solar System Research (MPS) has contributed to the development and construction of the instrument. ROSINA was developed at the University of Bern in Switzerland.
- MIDAS (Micro-Imaging Dust Analysis System). The high-resolution atomic force microscope investigated several physical aspects of the dust particles which are deposited on a silicon plate.
- COSIMA (Cometary Secondary Ion Mass Analyser). COSIMA analysed the composition of dust particles by secondary ion mass spectrometry, using indium ions. It could detect ions up to a mass of 6500 amu. COSIMA was built by the Max Planck Institute for Extraterrestrial Physics (MPE, Germany) with international contributions. The COSIMA team is led by the Max Planck Institute for Solar System Research (MPS, Germany).
- GIADA (Grain Impact Analyser and Dust Accumulator). GIADA analysed the dust environment of the comet coma by measuring the optical cross section, momentum, speed and mass of each grain entering inside the instrument.

=== Solar wind interaction ===
- RPC (Rosetta Plasma Consortium). It consists of 5 sensors a suite of five specialised sensors on the ESA Rosetta orbiter that measures the plasma environment, magnetic fields, and ion composition surrounding Comet 67P/Churyumov-Gerasimenko. It studies how the comet's gas interacts with the solar wind to form a coma. It has a Langmuir Probe to measure plasma density and electron temperature. An Ion and Electron Sensor to detect low-energy ions and electrons. An Ion Composition Analyzer, to help identify major ion species up to 40 keV/e. A Fluxgate Magnetometer, to measure the magnetic field. And a Mutual Impedance Probe to help study plasma density and wave characteristics. And had 2 booms, a Lower boom and an Upper boom. The lower boom was 1.55 meters long, and mounted the 2 fluxgate magnetometers and the Langmuir probe 2. The Upper boom had the Langmuir probe 1 and the Mutual Impedance Probe. Making the Upper boom a metre longer than its high-gain antenna

== Notable results ==
Researchers expect the study of data gathered will continue for decades to come.

=== Cometary activity ===
On 2 July 2015, scientists report that active pits, related to sinkhole collapses and possibly associated with outbursts, have been found on the comet. On 11 August 2015, scientists release images of a comet outburst that occurred on 29 July 2015.

=== Magnetic field ===
One of the first discoveries was that the magnetic field of 67P oscillated at 40–50 millihertz. A German composer and sound designer created an artistic rendition from the measured data to make it audible. Although it is a natural phenomenon, it has been described as a "song" and has been compared to Continuum for harpsichord by György Ligeti. However, results from Philae's landing show that the comet's nucleus has no magnetic field, and that the field originally detected by Rosetta is likely caused by the solar wind.

=== Inorganic chemistry ===
New analysis of the original Rosetta data was published in November 2024 suggesting that the isotopic signature of water vapour from comet 67P is similar to that found on Earth, correcting early interpretations of data that showed a significant difference in isotopic composition between Earth's water and 67P's water. That is, early results suggested the ratio of deuterium to hydrogen in the water from the comet was three times that found for terrestrial water; however, a re-analysis published in 2024 identified a significant measurement error that, when corrected, concluded that 67P's water isotopic composition is similar to Earth's. Thus it remains plausible that water found on Earth came from comets such as comet 67P, according to the scientists, and corroborates other deuterium-hydrogen ratio findings from Jupiter family comets. On 22 January 2015, NASA reported that, between June and August 2014, the rate at which water vapour was released by the comet increased up to tenfold.

On 2 June 2015, NASA reported that the Alice spectrograph on Rosetta determined that electrons within 1 km (0.6 mi) above the comet nucleus — produced from photoionization of water molecules, and not direct photons from the Sun as thought earlier — are responsible for the degradation of water and carbon dioxide molecules released from the comet nucleus into its coma.

One of the most outstanding discoveries of the mission was the detection of large amounts of free molecular oxygen (O_{2}) gas surrounding the comet. A local abundance of oxygen was reported to be in range from 1% to 10% relative to H_{2}O.

=== Organic chemistry ===
Previous observations have shown that comets contain complex organic compounds. These are the elements that make up nucleic acids and amino acids, essential ingredients for life as we know it. Comets are thought to have delivered a vast quantity of water to Earth, and they may have also seeded Earth with organic molecules. Rosetta and Philae searched for organic molecules, nucleic acids (the building blocks of DNA and RNA), and amino acids (the building blocks of proteins) by sampling and analysing the comet's nucleus and coma cloud of gas and dust, helping assess the contribution comets made to the beginnings of life on Earth.

The VIRTIS spectrometer has provided evidence of nonvolatile organic macromolecular compounds everywhere on the surface of comet 67P with little to no water ice visible. Preliminary analyses strongly suggest the carbon is present as polyaromatic organic solids mixed with sulfides and iron-nickel alloys.

Solid organic compounds were also found in the dust particles emitted by the comet; the carbon in this organic material is bound in "very large macromolecular compounds", analogous to those found in carbonaceous chondrite meteorites. However, no hydrated minerals were detected, suggesting no link with carbonaceous chondrites.

The Philae lander's COSAC instrument detected organic molecules in the comet's atmosphere as it descended to its surface. Measurements by the COSAC and Ptolemy instruments on the Philae's lander revealed sixteen organic compounds, four of which were seen for the first time on a comet, including acetamide, acetone, methyl isocyanate and propionaldehyde. The only amino acid detected thus far on the comet is glycine, along with the precursor molecules methylamine and ethylamine.

Two enantiomers of a generic amino acid

One of the research tasks of Rosetta and Philae was to test hypotheses as to why essential amino acids used by terrestrial life are almost all "left-handed", which refers to their chirality, or how the atoms arrange in relation to the carbon core of the molecule. Most asymmetrical molecules are oriented in approximately equal numbers of left- and right-handed configurations, and the primarily left-handed structure of essential amino acids used by living organisms is unique. One hypothesis was proposed in 1980s by William A. Bonner and Edward Rubenstein from Stanford University. They conjectured that circularly polarised radiation generated by a supernova could destroy one type of chiral molecules. The other surviving molecules would then spread into space, where they could eventually end up on a planet. However, the Rosetta mission couldn't contribute to this investigation, as the only amino acid it detected on the comet 67P was the non-chiral glycine. Later asteroid sample return missions Hayabusa2 and OSIRIS-REx found mostly racemic (equally left- and right-handed) mixtures of amino acids on their target asteroids Ryugu and Bennu. This suggests that the selection of left-handed amino acids for life happened on Earth.

== Public image ==
=== Once upon a time ... cartoon ===
Cartoon versions of Rosetta and Philae as they appear in the ESA's Once upon a time... series

As part of the European Space Agency's media campaign in support of the Rosetta mission, both the Rosetta and Philae spacecraft were given anthropomorphic personalities in an animated web series titled Once upon a time.... The series depicts various stages in the Rosetta mission, involving the personified Rosetta and Philae on "a classic road trip story into the depths of our universe", complemented with various visual gags presented in an educational context. Produced by animation studio Design & Data GmbH, the series was initially conceived by the ESA as a four-part fantasy-like series with a Sleeping Beauty theme that promoted community involvement in Rosetta's wake up from hibernation in January 2014. After the success of the series, however, the ESA commissioned the studio to continue producing new episodes in the series throughout the course of the mission. A total of twelve videos in the series were produced from 2013 to 2016, with a 25-minute compilation of the series released in December 2016, after the end of the mission. In 2019, Design & Data adapted the series into a 26-minute planetarium show that was commissioned by the Swiss Museum of Transport, and solicited to eighteen planetariums across Europe, with an aim "to inspire the young generation to explore the universe."

The Rosetta and Philae characters featured in Once upon a time..., designed by ESA employee and cartoonist Carlo Palazzari, became a central part of public image of the Rosetta mission, appearing in promotional material for the mission such as posters and merchandise, and often credited as a major factor in the popularity of the mission among the public. ESA employees also role-played as the characters on Twitter throughout the course of the mission. The characters were inspired by the JAXA's "kawaii" characters, who portrayed a number of their spacecraft, such as Hayabusa2 and Akatsuki, with distinct anime-like personalities. The script for each episode of the series is written by science communicators at the European Space Research and Technology Centre, who kept close with mission operators and the producers at Design & Data. Canonically, Rosetta and Philae are depicted as siblings, with Rosetta being the older sister, inspired by the spacecraft's feminine name, of Philae, her younger brother. The Giotto spacecraft is also depicted as the duo's grandfather, whereas others in the Halley Armada as well as NASA's Deep Impact and Stardust spacecraft are depicted as their cousins.

=== Ambition ===
To promote the spacecraft's arrival at comet 67P/Churyumov–Gerasimenko and the landing of Philae in 2014, a short film was produced by the European Space Agency with Polish visual effects production company Platige Image. Titled Ambition, the film, shot in Iceland, stars Irish actor Aidan Gillen, known for his roles in Game of Thrones and The Wire, and Irish actress Aisling Franciosi, also of Game of Thrones fame, and was directed by Oscar-nominated Polish director Tomasz Bagiński. Set in the far future, Ambition centers around a discussion between a master, played by Gillen, discussing the importance of ambition with his apprentice, played by Franciosi, using the Rosetta mission as an example of such. Ambition was premiered at the British Film Institute's Sci-Fi: Days of Fear and Wonder film festival in London on 24 October 2014, three weeks before the landing of Philae on 67P/Churyumov–Gerasimenko. British science fiction author and former ESA employee Alastair Reynolds spoke about the film's message at the premiere, stating to the audience that "our distant descendants may look back to Rosetta with the same sense of admiration that we reserve for, say, Columbus or Magellan." The film's conception was the result of the BFI's inquiry to the ESA for a contribution to their celebration of science fiction, with the ESA taking the opportunity to promote the Rosetta mission through the festival.

Critical reception of the film upon its premiere was mostly positive. Tim Reyes of Universe Today complimented the titular theme of ambition in the film, stating that it "shows us the forces at work in and around ESA", and that it "might accomplish more in 7 minutes than Gravity did in 90." Ryan Wallace of The Science Times also gave praise to the film, writing, "whether you're a sci-fi fanatic, or simply an interested humble astronomer, the short clip will undoubtedly give you a new view of our solar system, and the research out there in space today."

=== Media coverage ===
The entire mission was featured heavily in social media, with a Facebook account for the mission and both the satellite and the lander having an official Twitter account portraying a personification of both spacecraft. The hashtag "#CometLanding" gained widespread traction. A live stream of the control centres was set up, as were multiple official and unofficial events around the world to follow Philae's landing on 67P. On 23 September 2016, Vangelis released the studio album Rosetta in honour of the mission, which was used on 30 September in the "Rosetta's final hour" streaming video of the ESA Livestream event "Rosetta Grand Finale".

== Gallery ==
Video reports by the German Aerospace Center

About Rosetta's mission
(9 min., 1080p HD, English)

About Philae's landing
(10 min., 1080p HD, English)

== See also ==
- List of ESA missions
- Deep Impact (spacecraft)
- Giotto (spacecraft)
- Halley Armada
- Hayabusa
- List of missions to Mars
- Stardust (spacecraft)
- Timeline of Solar System exploration
