= Optical, Spectroscopic, and Infrared Remote Imaging System =

Main scientific imaging system on the orbiter

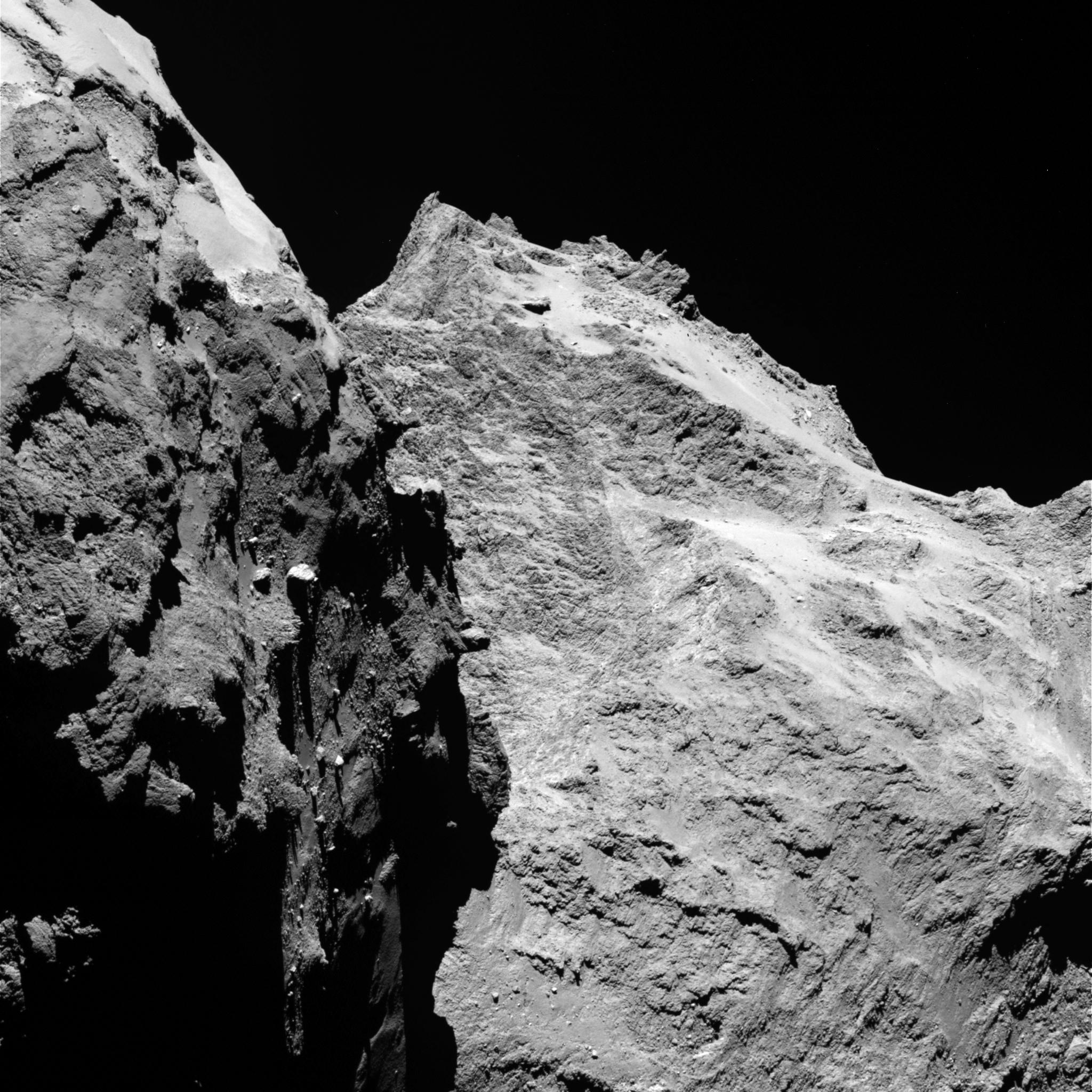
Credits: ESA/Rosetta/MPS for OSIRIS Team MPS/UPD/LAM/IAA/SSO/INTA/UPM/DASP/IDA Creative Commons Attribution-ShareAlike 3.0 IGO

OSIRIS (Optical, Spectroscopic, and Infrared Remote Imaging System) is the main scientific imaging system on the orbiter of the ESA spacecraft Rosetta for its mission to comet 67P/Churyumov–Gerasimenko. It was built by a consortium led by the German Max Planck Institute for Solar System Research.

OSIRIS was approved as an instrument for the spacecraft in 1996. It was launched in 2004 on Rosetta and was used until that mission concluded with the deactivation of the Rosetta spacecraft in September 2016.

The OSIRIS had two cameras, each with a different field of view. Both used a charge-coupled device (CCD). Each camera had the same type of CCD with a resolution of 2048 by 2048 pixels. The CCDs were supported by two digital signal processors that use solid-state memory. The computer used the VIRTUOSO operating system.

The fields of view were:

- Narrow angle, with a field of view of 2.4 by 2.4 degrees
- Wide angle, with a field of view of 12 by 12 degrees

It was launched on the Rosetta spacecraft in 2004, and first used in space in May 2004. In total, the OSIRIS cameras took 98,219 images during the entire mission, 76,308 of those at the comet. It operated for 22,176 hours.

== See also ==
- OSIRIS-REx (NASA asteroid probe)
