= Institut für Weltraumforschung (Space Research Institute) =

Austrian space institute

The Institut für Weltraumforschung (IWF - Space Research Institute) is one of the biggest institutes of the Austrian Academy of Sciences (Österreichische Akademie der Wissenschaften - OeAW) and is located in Graz. Established in 1970, it has been studying the physics of space plasmas and the atmospheres of planets inside and outside the Solar System for more than 50 years. With about 100 employees from twenty nations, it is located in the Victor Franz Hess Research Center of OeAW in the south of Graz. At the Lustbühel Observatory it operates a satellite laser ranging station, which is one of the best in the world.

== Participation in space missions ==
IWF is the only institute in Austria that develops and builds space-qualified instruments on a large scale. The data returned by them are scientifically analysed and physically interpreted at the institute. IWF's core engineering expertise is in building magnetometers and on-board computers, as well as in laser ranging to satellites and space debris. In terms of science, IWF concentrates on dynamic processes in space plasma physics and on the upper atmospheres of planets and exoplanets - i.e. planets outside the Solar System.

Space has been explored with the help of satellites for more than 60 years and still poses many puzzles. Since the beginning of the 1980s, IWF has contributed/is contributing to more than 40 international space missions with over 100 scientific instruments. The institute is currently involved in 23 projects led by the European Space Agency (ESA), NASA or national space agencies in Japan, Russia, China, and South Korea. The missions cover fleets of satellites in near-Earth space (Cluster, MMS, THEMIS), the observation of the Sun (STEREO, Solar Orbiter) and the exploration of planets such as Mercury (BepiColombo), Jupiter (Juno, JUICE) and extrasolar planets (CHEOPS). From building the instruments to analyzing their data, these projects last 10-30 years. While IWF has already "harvested" the data from past missions (Cassini/Huygens, Rosetta) and the scientists are eagerly analyzing the data from the current missions, in the laboratory the sophisticated sensors and instruments for future missions are being developed.
