= Spacecraft Event Time =

Spacecraft-local time for events that happen at the spacecraft

Spacecraft Event Time (SCET) is the spacecraft-local time for events that happen at the spacecraft. SCET is used for command programs that control the timing of spacecraft operations and to identify when specific events occur on the spacecraft relative to Earth time.

== SCET versus Earth time ==
Since signals between the spacecraft and Earth are limited to the speed of light, there is a delay between the time an event happens on the spacecraft (such as the transmission of data taken from an instrument reading) and the time that a signal reporting the event reaches Earth. Similarly, there is a delay between when instructions are sent from Earth and when the spacecraft receives the instructions. The length of delay is related to the distance between the sending and receiving points. Failure to take this delay into account could result in inaccurate data or mistakes in spacecraft control.

=== Calculating SCET ===
Determining the Spacecraft Event Time involves taking the time at Earth and adding or subtracting the signal travel time, depending on whether the signal is being sent to or received from the spacecraft. For events transmitted from the spacecraft to Earth, the SCET of an event on the spacecraft can be defined as equal to the ERT (Earth-Received Time) minus the OWLT (One-Way Light Time). For events transmitted from Earth to the spacecraft, the calculation is TRM (transmission time) plus OWLT. For example, if a signal were received on Earth at exactly 11:00 UTC from a spacecraft showing that it had just completed a maneuvering thrust, but the spacecraft was four light-hours away from Earth (the distance of the New Horizons spacecraft at one point as it approaches Pluto), the SCET time of the thrust maneuver would have been four hours earlier, at 07:00.

Spacecraft Event Time in UTC is also known as Orbiter UTC, and Earth-received time as Ground UTC.

=== Spacecraft control ===
Since it takes time for a radio transmission to reach a spacecraft from Earth, the usual operation of a spacecraft is controlled with an uploaded command script containing SCET markers to ensure a certain timeline of events. Because of the delay between the sending of instructions from Earth and their receipt and execution by the spacecraft, real-time commanding of robotic spacecraft is done rarely: usually only in response to an emergency event, when changes in spacecraft operations must be made as soon as possible. For example, a spacecraft could be instructed to go into safe mode to protect it during a coronal mass ejection (CME) from the Sun.

== Presentation format ==
Spacecraft event times stored in relation to instrument data from spacecraft events (e.g. images) are generally presented in ISO 8601 using one of the following formats:

- CCYY-MM-DDTHH:MM:SS.sssZ (preferred format)
- CCYY-DDDTHH:MM:SS.sssZ

However, the trailing Z (which indicates that the time is given in UTC) is often assumed/omitted.
