= List of stellar properties =

Pages Related to Stellar properties, Pages using the word stellar in a physics context.

- Stellar aberration
- Stellar age estimation
- Stellar archaeology
- Stellar astronomy
- Stellar atmosphere
- Stellar birthline
- Stellar black hole
- Stellar cartography
- Stellar chemistry
- Stellar chonography
- Stellar classification
- Stellar cluster
- Stellar collision
- Stellar core
- Stellar coronae
- Stellar density
- Stellar disk
- Stellar distance
- Stellar drift
- Stellar dynamics
- Stellar engine
- Stellar envelope see stellar atmosphere
- Stellar evolution
- Stellar flare
- Stellar flux
- Stellar fog
- Stellar halo
- Stellar interferometer
- Stellar isochrone
- Stellar kinematics
- Stellar limb-darkening
- Stellar luminosity
- Stellar magnetic field
- Stellar magnitude
- Stellar mass
- Stellar mass black hole
- Stellar mass loss
- Stellar molecule
- Stellar navigation
- Stellar near-collision
- Stellar neighborhood
- Stellar nucleosynthesis
- Stellar nursery
- Stellar occultation
- Stellar parallax
- Stellar physics
- Stellar planetary
- Stellar population
- Stellar precession
- Stellar pulsations
- Stellar quake
- Stellar radius
- Stellar remnant
- Stellar rotation
- Stellar scintillation
- Stellar seismology
- Stellar spectra
- Stellar spheroid
- Stellar spin-down
- Stellar structure
- Stellar surface fusion
- Stellar system
- Stellar triangulation
- Stellar uplift
- Stellar variation
- Stellar vault
- Stellar wind
- Stellar wind (disambiguation)
- Stellar wobble
- Stellar X-ray astronomy
- Stellar-wind bubble
- Other
  - Catalog of Stellar Identifications
  - Fossil stellar magnetic field
  - General Catalogue of Stellar Radial Velocities
  - General Catalogue of Trigonometric Stellar Parallaxes
  - Interstellar cloud
  - Inter-stellar clouds
  - Interstellar medium
  - List of stellar angular diameters
  - List of stellar streams
  - Low-dimensional chaos in stellar pulsations
  - Mark III Stellar Interferometer
  - Michelson stellar interferometer
  - NEMO (Stellar Dynamics Toolbox)
  - Non-stellar astronomical object
  - Quasi-stellar object
  - Substellar object
  - Sub-stellar object
  - Sydney University Stellar Interferometer
  - TD1 Catalog of Stellar Ultraviolet Fluxes
  - Timeline of stellar astronomy
  - Utah state stellar cluster
  - Young stellar object
