= Natural methane on Mars =

Presence of methane on Mars

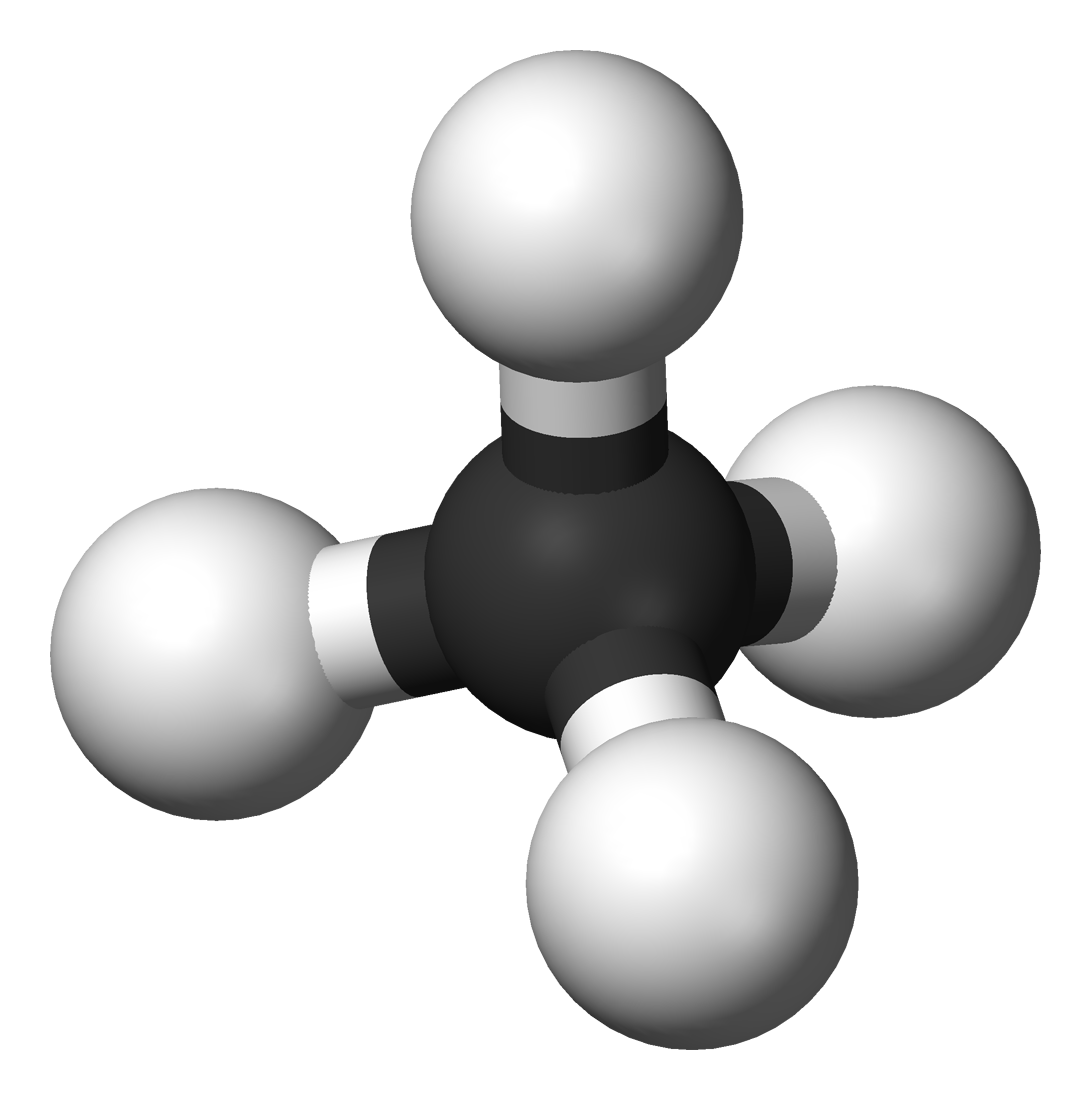
Model of a methane (CH_{4}) molecule

Natural methane on Mars refers to reports of detection of methane (CH_{4}) in Mars's atmosphere. The potential presence of methane in the atmosphere of Mars may indicate the presence of microbial life or geological activity.

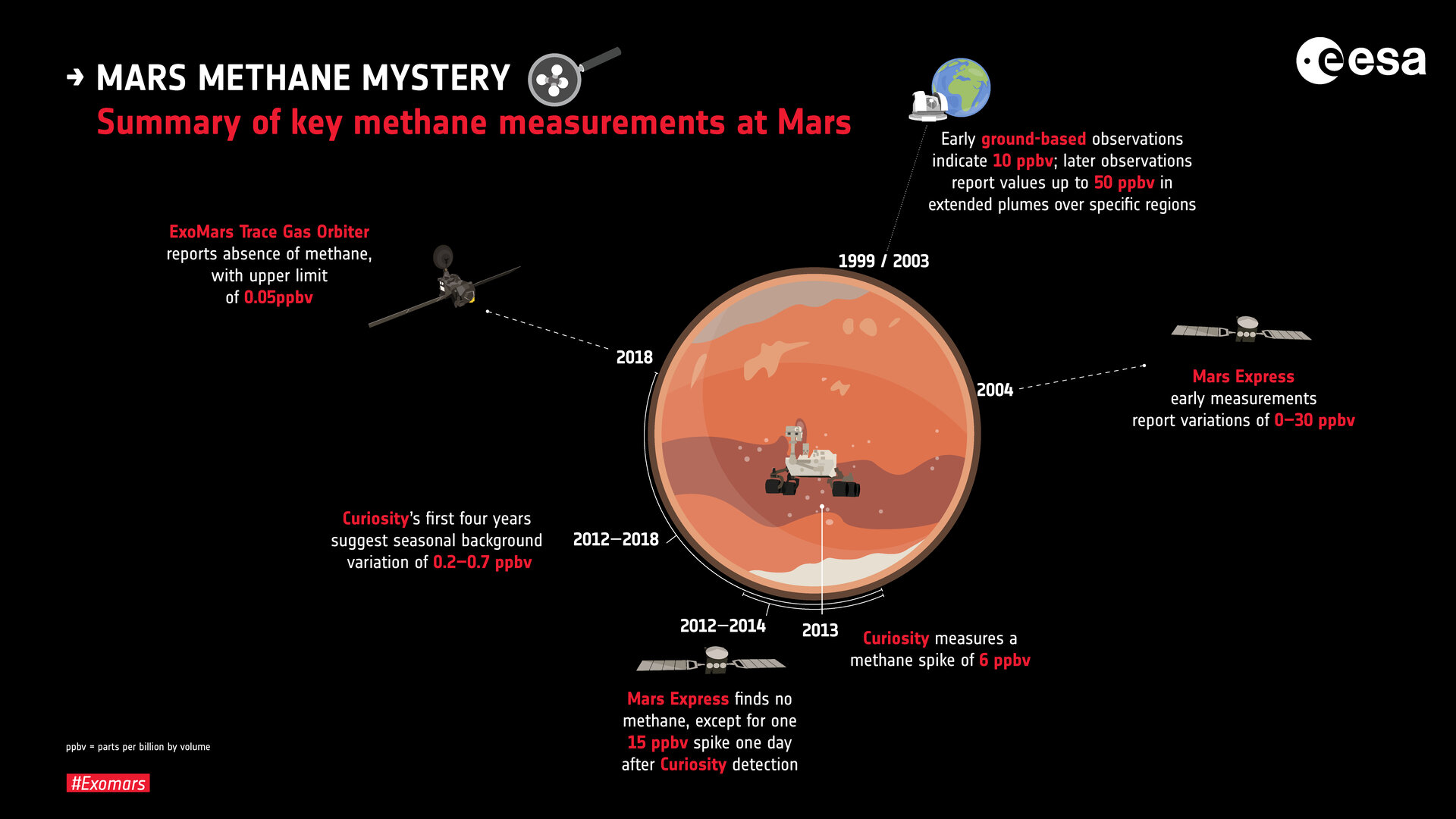
Graphic summary of detections and non-detections of methane in Mars's atmosphere (ESA)

Mars orbiters and rovers, as well as Earth-based telescopes, have used infrared spectroscopy to search for trace amounts of methane in Mars's atmosphere. Measurements of methane from 60 ppbv to under the detection limit (<0.05 ppbv) have been reported, but there is no scientific consensus on whether these observations genuinely corroborate the existence of methane on Mars.

== Reports of methane detection in Mars's atmosphere ==
=== Mariner 7 and Mariner 9 flyby missions ===
In 1969, the Mariner 7 science team reported in a press conference that methane and ammonia had been detected near the Marian polar ice cap. However, that claim was retracted after subsequent analyses revealed that the spectrometric signals were actually produced by carbon dioxide ice. Subsequent measurements of the chemistry of the Mars atmosphere by Mariner 9 did not detect methane, placing its upper limit at 20 ppbv.

=== Earth-based telescopes ===
Three ground-based telescope teams reported apparent extended plumes of methane on Mars in the summer of 2003. Detection of Mars methane (10±3 ppbv) was also reported at the Canada–France–Hawaii Telescope in 2004. Earth-based measurement of Mars looks through Earth's atmosphere, and telluric contamination from terrestrial methane is present in the measurement. Thus, these studies involved filtering out spectral lines for both CH_{4} and H_{2}O in the Earth's atmosphere. However, critics argued that many of the Doppler-shifted methane lines were still too close to telluric lines for water and other gases. The close proximity between telluric spectral lines and potential Martian spectral lines raised concerns about relying solely on one wavelength for methane detection. Subsequent ground-based telescope observations did not detect methane or methane oxidation products, with upper limits for methane of 7 ppbv.

=== Mars Express orbiter ===
In 2004, the science team of the Planetary Fourier Spectrometer on ESA's Mars Express orbiter reported detection of methane in Mars's atmosphere at a global average concentration of 10±5 ppbv, and peak abundances of 30 ppbv. These claims were later disputed on technical grounds related to instrumentation resolution and data-fitting. The Mars Global Surveyor reported contemporaneous confirmation of a spike in methane (16±3 ppbv) in Gale crater on 16 June 2013 (see Curiosity rover below).

=== Mars Global Surveyor ===
In 2010, the science team of the Thermal Emission Spectrometer on the Mars Global Surveyor reported detectable methane (5 to 33 ppbv) that seemed to vary seasonally. However, subsequent data validation was not able to definitively confirm the presence of methane in the previous report.

=== Curiosity rover ===
In August 2012, NASA's Curiosity rover landed on Mars in Gale crater with the Tunable Laser Spectrometer instrument capable of making precise methane abundance measurements. Initial data found no detectable methane (<1.3 ppbv) in the atmosphere of Gale Crater. A rise from <1 to 7±2 ppbv was observed from 2013 to 2014, followed by a drop back down to baseline levels, suggesting that Gale Crater may be episodically releasing methane from an unknown source. In 2018, the science team reported seasonal variation of methane in Gale Crater, from 0.2 to 0.7 ppbv. However, the statistical validity of the claims was disputed, and reanalysis showed no significant seasonal variation. In 2021, the science team reported day-night variation at Gale crater, from 0.05±0.22 ppbv in the day to 0.5±0.1 ppbv at night. In 2025, the possibility of leaks of terrestrial methane in the foreoptics chamber of the Tunable Laser Spectrometer was presented as a potential explanation for previous methane measurements by the rover.

=== Stratospheric Observatory for Infrared Astronomy ===
In 2016, the Stratospheric Observatory for Infrared Astronomy made spectral observations of the Martian atmosphere from Earth's stratosphere during the Martian summer in its northern hemisphere. When processing the data, care was taken to minimize interference from Earth-based methane spectral lines, and long observation times were used to increase signal-to-noise ratio. No methane was detected.

=== ExoMars ===
In 2019, the Trace Gas Orbiter on ExoMars reported non-detections of methane in Mars's upper atmosphere (5 km altitude), with an upper limit of 50 pptv. The ExoMars non-detections contradict the methane detections in Gale crater by the Curiosity rover. Moores and coworkers in 2019 proposed that a possible explanation for these apparently contradictory results could relate to the timing of ExoMars measurements. ExoMars measurements occur in the daytime and report non-detections. Should there be high concentrations of methane at night, higher surface temperatures during the day could cause convection currents that mix and dilute methane with the bulk atmosphere. Extensive further search of methane by ExoMars reported non-detections, with upper limits of 0.02 ppbv.

== Potential sources and sinks of methane on Mars ==
=== Sources ===
==== Geophysical ====
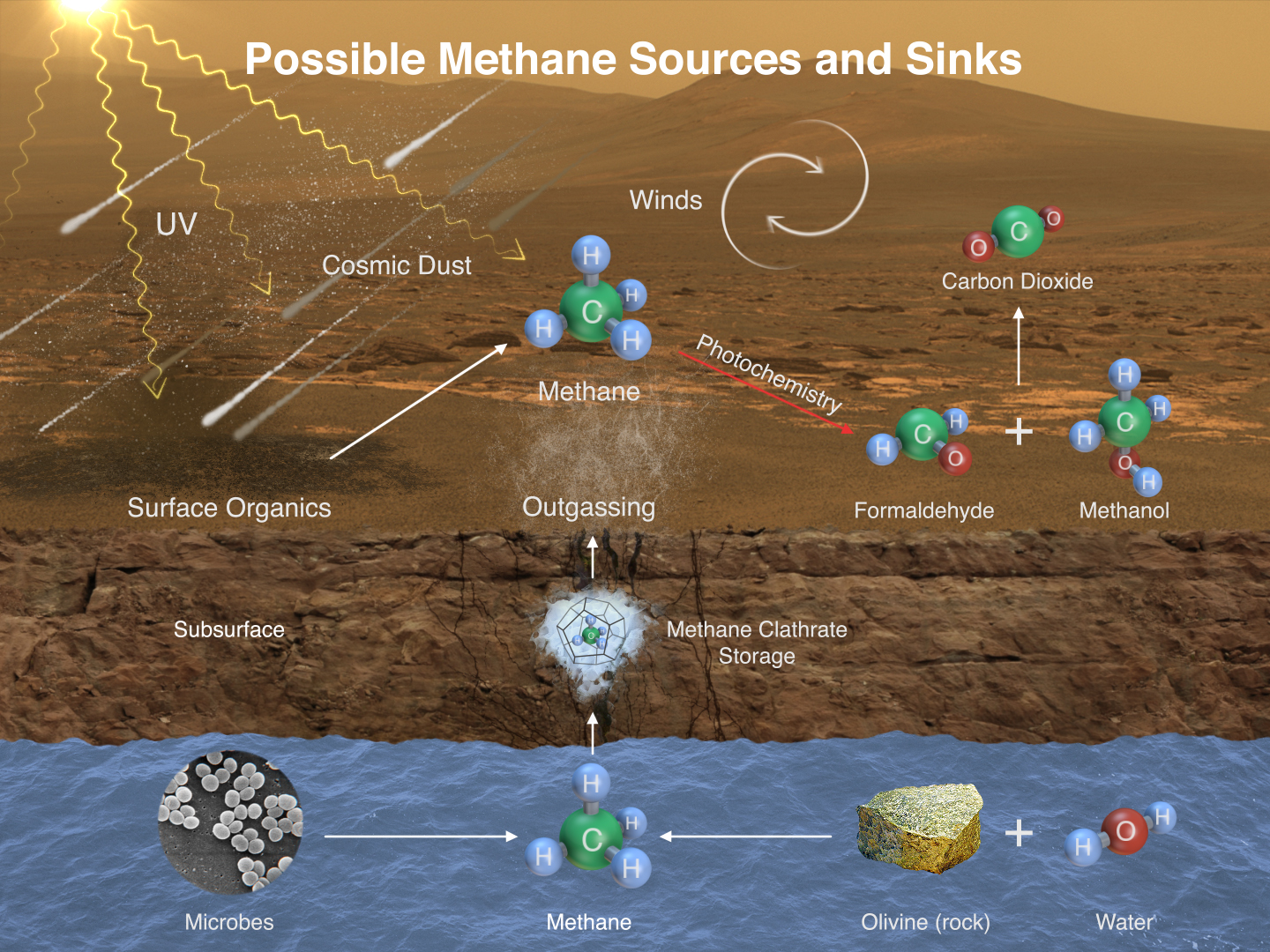
Possible methane sources and sinks on Mars.

The principal candidates for the origin of Mars's methane include non-biological processes such as water-rock reactions, radiolysis of water, and pyrite formation, all of which produce H_{2} that could then generate methane and other hydrocarbons via Fischer–Tropsch synthesis with CO and CO_{2}. It has also been shown that methane could be produced by the process called serpentinization, involving water, carbon dioxide, and the mineral olivine, which is known to be common on Mars. The lack of current volcanism, hydrothermal activity or hotspots is not favorable for geologic methane.

Another possible geophysical source could be ancient methane trapped in clathrate hydrates that may be released occasionally. Under the assumption of a cold early Mars environment, a cryosphere could have trapped methane as clathrates at depth, which might exhibit sporadic release.

Another possible methane source is electrical discharge from dust particles in sand storms and dust devil interacting with water ice and CO_{2}.

==== Biogenic ====
Living microorganisms, such as methanogens, are another possible source of methane on Mars. Methanogens do not require oxygen or organic nutrients, use hydrogen as their energy source, and CO_{2} as their carbon source, so they could potentially exist in subsurface environments on Mars, where it is still warm enough for liquid water to exist. Experiments have shown that some methanogenic archaea can survive low pressures and desiccation characteristic of Mars. However, there is no evidence for the presence of such organisms on Mars.

=== Sinks ===
==== Photochemistry ====
Ultraviolet radiation can drive photochemical methane decomposition or reactions with other molecules, such as water vapor or ozone. However, current photochemical models suggest that the atmospheric lifetime of methane on Mars is several centuries, which is contradictory to reports of methane plumes and seasonal or diurnal cycles. To reconcile reported methane detections with current knowledge of photochemistry, methane degradation would need to be at least 600 times faster than previously expected based on atmosphere composition, necessitating the existence of an as-yet-unknown methane destruction mechanism.

==== Geophysical ====
Methane may react with tumbling quartz sand and olivine to form covalent Si–CH_{3} bonds.

Oxidants present in the regolith are another possible methane sink. However, models suggest that the atmospheric interactions with the regolith surface are not long enough to cause the removal necessary to explain the observations.

== See also ==
- Atmosphere of Mars
- Climate of Mars
- Life on Mars
- Weather of Mars
