= Geochemical Journal =

Scientific journal

- Discipline: Geochemistry
- Language: English
- Edited by: Katsuhiko Suzuki

Publication details
- History: 1966–present
- Publisher: Geochemical Society of Japan
- Open access: Yes
- License: CC BY
- Impact factor: 1.561 (2020)

Standard abbreviations
- ISO 4: Geochem. J.

Indexing
- CODEN: GEJOBE
- ISSN: 0016-7002 (print); 1880-5973 (web)
- LCCN: 79645218
- OCLC no.: 783321959

Links
- Journal homepage; Online archive

The Geochemical Journal is a peer-reviewed open-access scientific journal covering all aspects of geochemistry and cosmochemistry. It is published by the Geochemical Society of Japan and the editor-in-chief is Katsuhiko Suzuki.

== Abstracting and indexing ==
The journal is abstracted and indexed in:

- CAB Abstracts
- Chemical Abstracts Service
- Current Contents/Physical, Chemical & Earth Sciences
- Science Citation Index Expanded
- Scopus

According to the Journal Citation Reports, the journal has a 2020 impact factor of 1.561.
