= Atmospheric Chemistry Suite =

Infrared spectrometer channels

- Operator: European Space Agency
- Manufacturer: Russia & France
- Instrument type: Fourier infrared spectrometer
- Function: Atmospheric chemical analysis
- Mission duration: 7 years (planned)
- Began operations: 19 October 2016

Properties
- Spectral band: Infrared

Host spacecraft
- Spacecraft: ExoMars Trace Gas Orbiter
- Operator: Roscosmos
- Launch date: 14 March 2016, 09:31 UTC
- Rocket: Proton-M/Briz-M
- Launch site: Baikonur 200/39
- COSPAR ID: 2016-017A
- Orbit: Mars

The Atmospheric Chemistry Suite (ACS) is a science payload consisting of three infrared spectrometer channels aboard the ExoMars Trace Gas Orbiter (TGO) orbiting Mars since October 2016. The three channels are: the near-infrared channel (NIR), the mid-infrared channel (MIR), and the far infrared channel (FIR, also called TIRVIM).

The ACS was proposed in 2011 by Russian Academy Section and eventually accepted by the European Space Agency (ESA) and Roscosmos as one of two Russian instruments onboard TGO. The instrument was funded by Roscosmos and Centre national d'études spatiales (CNES) of France, and has components of both Russia and France. Its development and fabrication were under Russian leadership. The functionality of all the three channels was confirmed during cruise to Mars.

== Objectives ==
The main objective of the ACS suite is to make an inventory and map minor atmospheric species or trace gases in the atmosphere of Mars. This will allow scientists to profile the upper limits on the methane contents, and to possibly to detect sulfur dioxide (SO_{2}), a gas of volcanic origin.

== Channels ==
The near-infrared channel (NIR), is a compact spectrometer operating in the range of 0.7–1.7 μm with a resolving power of λ/Δλ ~ 20,000 and with a spectral range of 10–20 nm. It is designed to operate in nadir and in solar occultation modes.

The mid-infrared channel (MIR) is an echelle spectrometer with crossed dispersion, designed exclusively for solar occultation measurements in the 2.2–4.4 μm spectral range with a resolving power of approximately 50,000.

The far-infrared channel covers the thermal infrared spectroscopy; it is a Fourier spectrometer called the TIRVIM. It has an aperture of ~5 cm and it measures the spectrum of 1.7–17 μm. Its main task will be for temperature sounding of the Martian atmosphere in the 15-μm CO_{2} band. TIRVIM has 10 times higher performances than the PFS spectrometer of Mars Express orbiter.

Channel designation	Abbreviation	Wavelength	Trace gas detected
Near-Infrared	NIR	0.7–1.7 μm	H_{2}O, O_{2}, CO_{2}, O^{−}_{2}, OH^{−}, and NO^{−}
Mid-Infrared	MIR	2.2–4.4 μm	CH_{4}, H_{2}O, HO_{2}, HDO, HF, HCl, CO, SO_{2}, CO_{2} and their isotopes, etc.
Far-Infrared (Thermal-Infrared)	FIR or TIRVIM	1.7–17 μm	Temperature profiles, CO_{2}, H_{2}O_{2}, dust, water ice.

== Methane ==
Of particular interest to this astrobiology mission, is the detection and characterization of the atmospheric methane (CH_{4}), as it may be of geological or biological nature. Large differences in the abundances were measured between observations taken in 2003, 2006, and in 2014 NASA reported that the Curiosity rover detected a tenfold increase ('spike') in methane in the atmosphere in late 2013 and early 2014. This suggests that the methane was locally concentrated and is probably seasonal. Because methane on Mars would quickly break down due to ultraviolet radiation from the Sun and chemical reactions with other gases, its persistent presence in the atmosphere also implies the existence of an unknown source to continually replenish the gas.

Measuring the ratio of hydrogen and methane levels on Mars may help determine the likelihood of life on Mars. According to the scientists, "...low H_{2}/CH_{4} ratios (less than approximately 40) indicate that life is likely present and active."
