= Yttrium oxide =

Yttrium oxide may refer to:

- Yttrium(II) oxide, YO, a dark brown solid
- Yttrium(III) oxide, Y_{2}O_{3}, a colorless solid
