= Alis Deason =

British astrophysicist

Alis Jones Deason is a British astrophysicist whose research concerns the stellar archaeology of the Milky Way and the structure of its galactic halo. She is a professor at Durham University in its Institute for Computational Cosmology, and a research professor in Durham's Department of Physics.

== Education and career ==
Deason is originally from Fishguard, in western Wales. She read astrophysics as an undergraduate at the University of Cambridge from 2005 to 2009, and then continued at Cambridge for a 2012 Ph.D. Her dissertation, The stellar and dark matter haloes of local galaxies, was jointly supervised by Vasily Belokurov and N. Wyn Evans.

She became a postdoctoral researcher at the University of California, Santa Cruz from 2012 to 2015, supported by a Hubble Fellowship. Following this, she continued her research as a Porat Fellow at Stanford University from 2015 to 2016, and then as a Royal Society University Research Fellow at Durham University from 2016 until 2025.

== Research ==
Deason's advisor Vasily Belokurov, describing the research for which he received the 2026 Kavli Prize, credits Deason's work as a beginning graduate student for the observation that the galactic halo is more irregular than predicted, providing evidence that it had been formed through the accretion of halos from smaller satellite galaxies. Deason's later research included simulation of this accretion process, and determined that the remaining satellite galaxies include a subpopulation that were among the first generation of galaxies to be formed.

She has used the orbital velocities of halo stars to map the outer boundaries of dark matter in the halo. She was also part of a study that reduced the likelihood of a merge between the Milky Way and the Andromeda Galaxy, previously predicted to occur in approximately 5 billion years, because of increased uncertainty in the combined motion of the two galaxies.

== Recognition ==
Deason was a 2018 recipient of the Philip Leverhulme Prize. A primary school science engagement programme based on connections between football (soccer) and physics that she founded and led, called Stargoal, won a 2024 Odgen Trust Outreach Award in the Partnering with Schools category.
