= Stellar chemistry =

Study of the chemical composition and chemical processes in stars

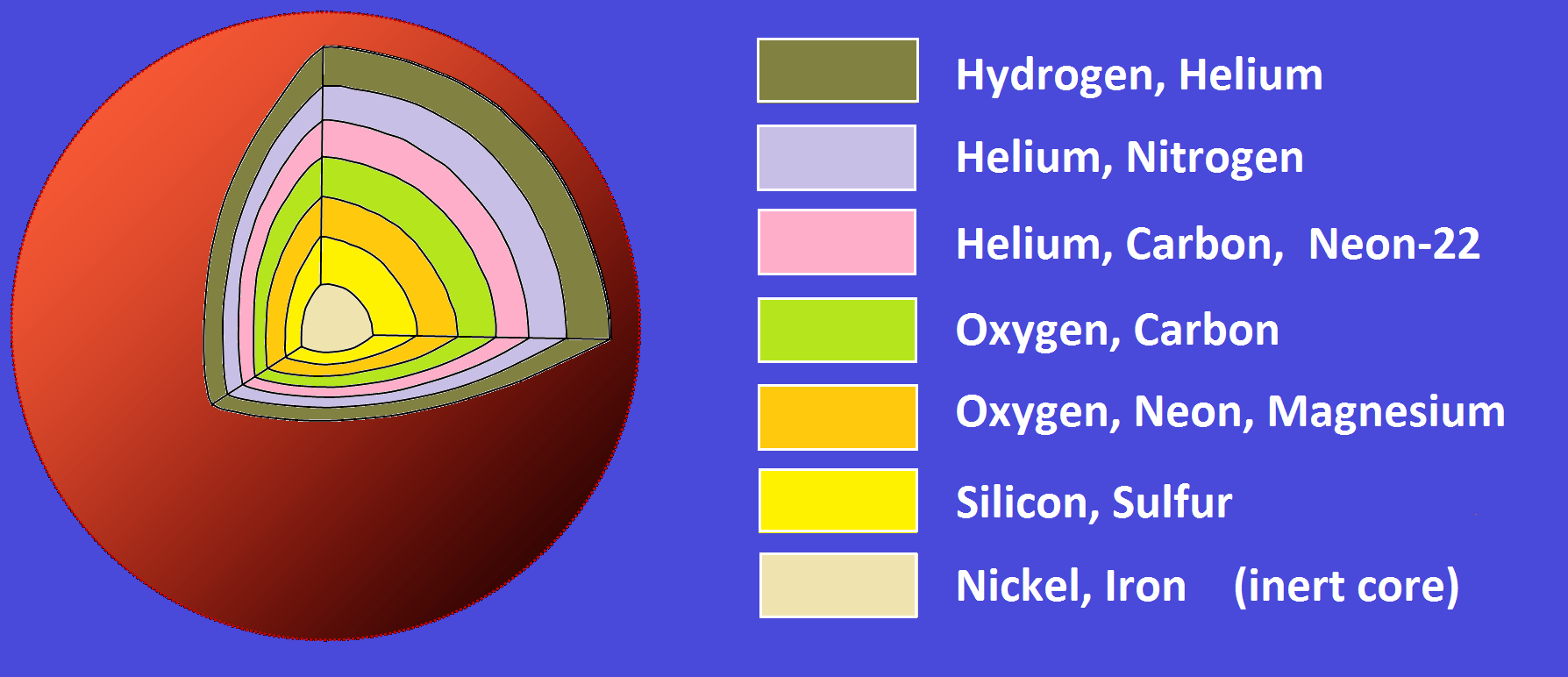
Internal structure of a massive star shortly before core collapse, showing concentric shells of fusion products formed during successive stages of stellar nucleosynthesis.

Stellar chemistry is the study of the chemical composition of stars and the physical and chemical processes that govern how elements are formed, transported, and observed in stellar environments. It is a subfield of astrophysics and is closely connected to astrochemistry, nuclear astrophysics, and galactic chemical evolution. Stellar chemistry encompasses both the internal nucleosynthesis reactions that create new elements and the observable atmospheric signatures—such as spectral lines and abundance patterns—that reveal a star’s origin, age, and evolutionary state.

Understanding stellar chemical composition is essential for reconstructing the chemical evolution of galaxies, determining stellar ages, identifying distinct stellar populations, and constraining the conditions under which planetary systems form. Chemical abundances also provide key diagnostics for processes such as stellar convection, diffusion, mass loss, and supernova enrichment, linking the life cycles of stars to the broader evolution of the Universe.

== Chemical composition of stars ==
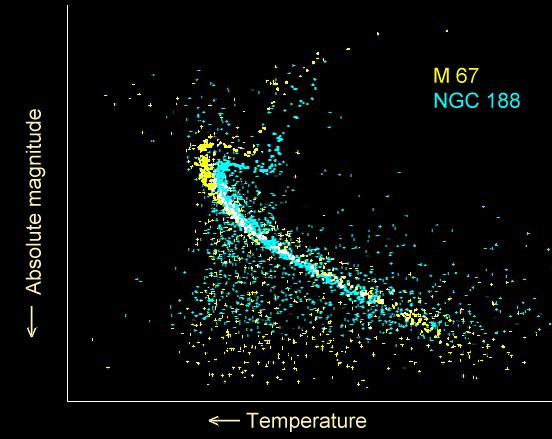
Hertzsprung–Russell diagram for the open clusters M 67 (yellow) and NGC 188 (cyan). The distribution of stars along the main sequence and turnoff reflects differences in age and chemical composition between the clusters.

Stars are composed primarily of hydrogen and helium, with heavier elements—collectively referred to as metals in astronomy—constituting only a small fraction of their mass. The relative abundance of these heavier elements is expressed as a star’s metallicity, commonly measured through the logarithmic iron abundance ratio [[[Fe/H]]].

Metallicity varies systematically among different stellar populations:

- Population I stars (e.g., the Sun) are metal‑rich and predominantly found in galactic disks.
- Population II stars are metal‑poor and typically located in halos and globular clusters.
- Population III stars are hypothetical first‑generation stars composed almost entirely of hydrogen and helium, formed before significant stellar nucleosynthesis enriched the Universe.

Chemical abundances provide key information about the environments in which stars formed, the interstellar medium from which they condensed, and the nucleosynthetic contributions of earlier stellar generations. Variations in metallicity across stellar populations underpin studies of galactic chemical evolution, stellar age determination, and the formation of planetary systems.

== Nuclear processes and element formation ==
The chemical composition of a star evolves over time as nuclear fusion reactions in its core convert lighter elements into heavier ones. The dominant fusion pathways depend on the star’s mass, temperature, and evolutionary stage. Major processes include:

- The proton–proton chain, which powers Sun-like stars and other low‑mass stars.
- The CNO cycle, dominant in hotter and more massive stars where carbon, nitrogen, and oxygen act as catalysts for hydrogen burning.
- The triple-alpha process, which fuses helium into carbon during the red giant phase.
- The s-process (slow neutron capture), occurring primarily in asymptotic giant branch (AGB) stars and responsible for producing many elements beyond iron.
- The r-process (rapid neutron capture), which takes place in highly energetic environments such as core-collapse supernovae and neutron star mergers.

Together, these processes generate most of the elements heavier than helium and drive the chemical enrichment of the interstellar medium. The products of stellar nucleosynthesis are later incorporated into new generations of stars and planetary systems, linking stellar evolution to the broader cycle of galactic chemical evolution.

== Stellar atmospheres and abundance measurements ==
Solar irradiance spectrum showing the theoretical blackbody curve (yellow), the solar spectrum at the top of Earth’s atmosphere (orange), and the spectrum at sea level (blue). Atmospheric absorption by gases such as water vapor, oxygen, and carbon dioxide produces dips in the observed spectrum.

Ground‑based observations of stellar spectra must account for absorption by Earth’s atmosphere. Molecules such as water vapor, oxygen, and carbon dioxide introduce wavelength‑dependent attenuation—particularly in the infrared—that alters the apparent depth and shape of spectral features. Accurate abundance measurements therefore require correction using atmospheric models, telluric calibration, or observations from space telescopes. The visible portion of the spectrum is least affected by atmospheric absorption and remains the primary window for high‑precision optical spectroscopy.

Chemical abundances in stars are determined primarily through spectroscopy. Absorption lines in stellar spectra reveal the presence and relative abundance of elements in the stellar atmosphere, and their strengths depend on temperature, pressure, and ionization state. Modern abundance analysis combines:

- high‑resolution spectroscopy
- stellar atmosphere models under LTE and non-LTE assumptions
- radiative transfer calculations
- large spectroscopic surveys such as APOGEE, GALAH, LAMOST, and the Gaia-ESO Survey

Abundance ratios such as [Fe/H] (iron relative to hydrogen) and [α/Fe] (alpha‑elements relative to iron) are widely used to classify stellar populations, trace galactic chemical evolution, and identify stars with distinct formation histories.

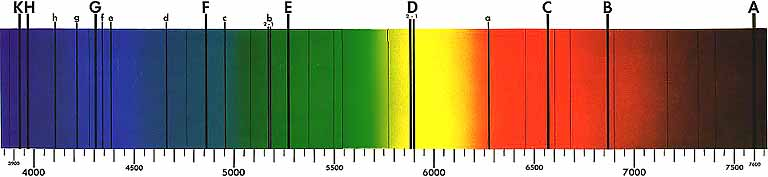
Visible solar spectrum showing Fraunhofer absorption lines.

== Chemical evolution during stellar lifetimes ==
As stars evolve, internal mixing and mass‑loss processes alter their observable chemical composition. Key mechanisms include:

- Convective mixing in red giants
- Dredge‑up events in AGB stars, which bring carbon and s‑process elements to the surface
- Rotational mixing in massive stars
- Mass loss through stellar winds, which enriches the surrounding medium with newly synthesised elements

These processes explain the chemical diversity observed among evolved stars.

== Chemically peculiar stars ==
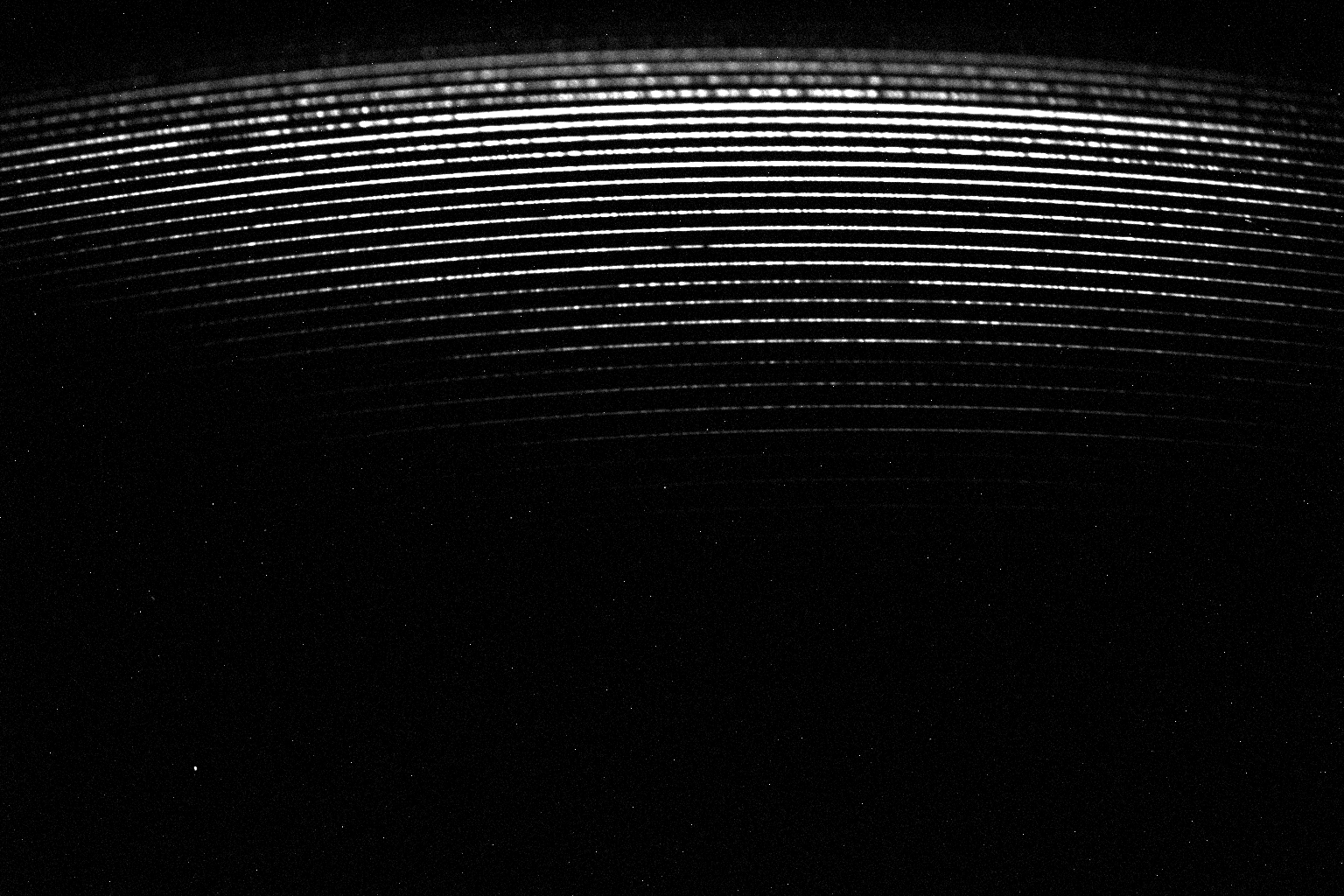
Echelle spectrum of the carbon star UU Aurigae, showing prominent molecular absorption bands from species such as C₂ and CN. These features reflect the star’s chemically enriched atmosphere and carbon‑rich composition.

A number of stellar classes exhibit unusual or anomalous chemical signatures in their spectra. These chemically peculiar stars provide important diagnostics of internal mixing, magnetic fields, binary interactions, and late‑stage nucleosynthesis. Major categories include:

- Carbon stars – giants enriched in carbon due to third dredge‑up of helium‑burning products during the AGB phase, producing strong molecular bands of C₂, CN, and CH.
- Ap and Am stars – A‑type stars showing overabundances or underabundances of specific metals caused by atomic diffusion and, in Ap stars, strong magnetic fields.
- Wolf–Rayet stars – massive, evolved stars whose powerful winds expose layers enriched in helium, nitrogen, carbon, or oxygen, revealing products of advanced nuclear burning.
- Barium stars – G‑ and K‑type giants enriched in s-process elements such as barium and strontium, typically through mass transfer from a former AGB companion in a binary system.

These chemical peculiarities offer insight into stellar interiors, magnetic and rotational processes, binary evolution pathways, and the nucleosynthetic origins of heavy elements.

== Stellar chemistry and planetary habitability ==
Stellar chemical composition influences the formation and long‑term stability of planetary systems. Some studies suggest that higher abundances of elements such as carbon, magnesium, sodium, and silicon may affect stellar evolution rates and the duration of a star’s habitable zone. Oxygen abundance may also influence how long a planet remains within a star’s habitable zone.

== Stellar chemistry in star formation ==
Chemical processes play a significant role in the earliest stages of stellar evolution. Observations of embedded young stellar objects (YSOs) in the Large Magellanic Cloud with the Spitzer Space Telescope show that water ice, CO ice, and other volatile species influence the chemistry of protostellar envelopes and circumstellar disks. These ices participate in grain‑surface reactions, regulate thermal balance, and affect the initial chemical inventory available for star and planet formation.

== Effects of stellar activity on planetary atmospheres ==
Stellar activity—including stellar flares, coronal mass ejections, and high‑energy ultraviolet and X-ray radiation—can strongly influence the atmospheric chemistry of orbiting exoplanets. These energetic events drive photochemical reactions, alter ozone abundance, and can modify the long‑term stability of planetary atmospheres.

A 2010 study modeling the impact of a strong flare from the active M‑dwarf AD Leonis on an Earth‑like planet found that such events do not necessarily sterilize planetary surfaces, even around highly active stars, although they can induce significant short‑term chemical perturbations.

== See also ==
- Abundance of the chemical elements
- Astrochemistry
- Cosmochemistry
- Metallicity
- Molecules in stars
- Nucleosynthesis
- Stellar evolution
