= Molecules in stars =

Molecules that exist or form in stars

Stellar molecules are molecules that exist or form in stars. Such formations can take place when the temperature is low enough for molecules to form – typically around 6,000 K (5,730 °C; 10,340 °F) or cooler. Otherwise the stellar matter is restricted to atoms and ions in the forms of gas or – at very high temperatures – plasma.

== Background ==
Matter is made up by atoms (formed by protons and other subatomic particles). When the environment is right, atoms can join and form molecules, which give rise to most materials studied in materials science. But certain environments, such as high temperatures, don't allow atoms to form molecules, as the environmental energy exceeds that of the dissociation energy of the bonds within the molecule. Stars have very high temperatures, primarily in their interior, and therefore there are few molecules formed in stars.

By the mid-18th century, scientists surmised that the source of the Sun's light was incandescence, rather than combustion.

== Evidence and research ==
Although the Sun is a star, its photosphere has a low enough temperature of 6,000 K (5,730 °C; 10,340 °F), and therefore molecules can form. Water has been found on the Sun, and there is evidence of H_{2} in white dwarf stellar atmospheres.

Cooler stars include absorption band spectra that are characteristic of molecules. Similar absorption bands can be found through observation of solar sun spots, which are cool enough to allow persistence of stellar molecules. Molecules found in the Sun include MgH, CaH, FeH, CrH, NaH, OH, SiH, VO, and TiO. Others include CN, CH, MgF, NH, C_{2}, SrF, ZrO, YO, ScO, and BH.

Stars of most types can contain molecules, even the Ap category of A-type stars. Only the hottest O-, B-, and A-type stars have no detectable molecules. Carbon-rich white dwarfs, even though very hot, have spectral lines of C_{2} and CH.

=== Laboratory measurements ===
Measurements of simple molecules that may be found in stars are performed in laboratories to determine the wavelengths of the spectra lines. Also, it is important to measure the dissociation energy and oscillator strengths (how strongly the molecule interacts with electromagnetic radiation). These measurements are inserted into formula that can calculate the spectrum under different conditions of pressure and temperature. However, man-made conditions are often different from those in stars, because it is hard to achieve the temperatures, and also local thermal equilibrium, as found in stars, is unlikely. Accuracy of oscillator strengths and actual measurement of dissociation energy is usually only approximate.

=== Model atmosphere ===
A numerical model of a star's atmosphere will calculate pressures and temperatures at different depths, and can predict the spectrum for different elemental concentrations.

== Application ==
The molecules in stars can be used to determine some characteristics of the star. The isotopic composition can be determined if the lines in the molecular spectrum are observed. The different masses of different isotopes cause vibration and rotation frequencies to significantly vary. Secondly the temperature can be determined, as the temperature will change the numbers of molecules in the different vibrational and rotational states. Some molecules are sensitive to the ratio of elements, and so indicate elemental composition of the star. Different molecules are characteristic of different kinds of stars, and are used to classify them. Because there can be numerous spectral lines of different strength, conditions at different depths in the star can be determined. These conditions include temperature and speed towards or away from the observer.

The spectrum of molecules has advantages over atomic spectral lines, as atomic lines are often very strong, and therefore only come from high in the atmosphere. Also the profile of the atomic spectral line can be distorted due to isotopes or overlaying of other spectral lines. The molecular spectrum is much more sensitive to temperature than atomic lines.

== Detection ==
The following molecules have been detected in the atmospheres of stars:

Two-atom molecules found in stars
Molecule	Designation
AlH	Aluminium monohydride
AlO	Aluminium monoxide
C_{2}	Diatomic carbon
CH	Carbyne
CN	Cyanide
CO	Carbon monoxide
CaCl	Calcium monochloride
CaH	Calcium monohydride
CeH	Cerium monohydride
CeO	Cerium monoxide
CoH	Cobalt hydride
CrH	Chromium hydride
CuH	Copper hydride
FeH	Iron hydride
HCl	Hydrogen chloride
HF	Hydrogen fluoride
H_{2}	Molecular hydrogen
LaO	Lanthanum monoxide
MgH	Magnesium monohydride
MgO	Magnesium oxide
NH	Imidogen
NiH	Nickel monohydride
OH	Hydroxide
ScO	Scandium monoxide
SiH	Silicon monohydride
SiO	Silicon monoxide
TiO	Titanium monoxide
VO	Vanadium monoxide
YO	Yttrium monoxide
ZnH	Zinc monohydride
ZrO	Zirconium oxide

Three-atom molecules found in stars
Molecule	Designation
C_{3}	Tricarbon
HCN	Hydrogen cyanide
C_{2}H	Ethynyl radical
CO_{2}	Carbon dioxide
SiC_{2}	Silicon dicarbide
CaNC	Calcium isocyanide
CaOH	Calcium hydroxide
H_{2}O	Water

Four-atom molecules found in stars
Molecule	Designation
C_{2}H_{2}	Acetylene

Five-atom molecules found in stars
Molecule	Designation
CH_{4}	Methane

== See also ==
- Stellar chemistry
