= Model spectrum =

Artificial spectrum of a star

In astrophysics, a model spectrum (often called a synthetic spectrum) is a theoretical spectrum of a star calculated from a stellar atmosphere model that predicts how radiation emerges from the star’s outer layers. Synthetic spectra are used to interpret observed stellar spectra and to derive fundamental stellar parameters by fitting the predicted features to observational data.

These models use physical parameters such as effective temperature, surface gravity, chemical composition, and radiative transfer to compute the absorption and emission features expected in the star’s spectrum. A model spectrum will usually be of a specific spectral type of star. It may include other properties of the star, such as a surrounding nebula, presence or lack of an extended atmosphere, or a circumstellar dust disc.

Libraries of synthetic stellar spectra spanning ranges of stellar properties have been produced including PHOENIX, MARCS, ATLAS, and others to facilitate quantitative research with spectroscopic observations.
