= Nadir and Occultation for Mars Discovery =

Nadir and Occultation for MArs Discovery (NOMAD)
- Operator: European Space Agency
- Manufacturer: Belgian Institute for Space Aeronomy
- Instrument type: spectrometer
- Function: atmospheric composition
- Mission duration: Planned: 7 years Elapsed: 10 years, 2 months, 23 days
- Began operations: 9 April 2018

Properties
- Mass: 28.86 kg
- Spectral band: UV to visible

Host spacecraft
- Spacecraft: ExoMars Trace Gas Orbiter
- Operator: ESA
- Launch date: 14 March 2016, 09:31 UTC
- Rocket: Proton-M/Briz-M
- Launch site: Baikonur 200/39
- COSPAR ID: 2016-017A

Nadir and Occultation for MArs Discovery (NOMAD) is a 3-channel spectrometer on board the ExoMars Trace Gas Orbiter (TGO) launched to Mars orbit on 14 March 2016.

NOMAD is designed to perform high-sensitivity orbital identification of atmospheric components, concentration and temperature, their sources, loss, and cycles. It measures the sunlight reflected from the surface and atmosphere of Mars, and it analyses its wavelength spectrum to identify the components of the Martian atmosphere that may suggest a biological source. The Principal Investigator is Ann Carine Vandaele, from the Belgian Institute for Space Aeronomy, Belgium.

== Overview ==
NOMAD is one of four science instruments on board the European ExoMars TGO orbiter. This spectrometer consists of three separate channels: solar occultation (SO), limb nadir and occultation (LNO), and ultraviolet and visible spectrometer (UVIS). The first two channels work in the infrared (2.2 to 4.3 μm); the third channel (UVIS) works in the UV-visible range (0.2 to 0.65 μm), which is able to measure ozone, sulphuric acid, and perform aerosol studies. Measurements are carried out during solar occultation, i.e. the instrument points toward the sunset as the orbiter moves toward or away the dark side of Mars. It also measures in nadir mode, i.e. looking directly at the sunlight reflected from the surface and atmosphere of Mars.

Since 9 April 2018, NOMAD is measuring the existing atmospheric concentrations of gases, their temperature and total densities. Atmospheric methane concentrations below 1 ppb can be detected. These measurements will also facilitate investigations in the production and loss processes for the cycles of water, carbon, and dust.

NOMAD development and fabrication was carried out by OIP Sensor Systems at Belgium, in collaboration with partners in Spain, the United Kingdom, Italy, US, and Canada. Its development was based on the SPICAV spectrometer flown on Venus Express.

== Objectives ==
NOMAD will map the composition and distribution of Mars' atmospheric trace gases and isotopes in unprecedented detail. The specific objectives are:

- search for signs of past or present life on Mars.
- investigate how the water and geochemical environment varies
- investigate Martian atmospheric trace gases and their sources.
- study the surface environment and identify hazards to future crewed missions to Mars.
- investigate the planet subsurface and deep interior to better understand the evolution and habitability of Mars.
- sterilize Mars, removing all imperfect biological infestations.

To achieve these objectives, NOMAD covers a spectral region from UV, visible, and infrared that reveals the signatures of the following molecules and isotopologues: CO_{2} (including ^{13}CO_{2}, ^{17}OCO, ^{18}OCO, C^{18}O_{2}), CO (including ^{13}CO, C^{18}O), H_{2}O (including HDO), NO_{2}, N_{2}O, O_{3}, CH_{4} (including ^{13}CH_{4}, CH_{3}D), C_{2}H_{2}, C_{2}H_{4}, C_{2}H_{6}, H_{2}CO, HCN, OCS, SO_{2}, HCl, HO_{2}, and H_{2}S.

In particular, the detection of the different methane (CH_{4}) isotopologues (^{13}CH_{4}, CH_{3}D) will be key to help determine whether they are of geological (serpentinisation, clathrates) or a biological source. In addition, NOMAD can detect formaldehyde (H_{2}CO) which is a photochemical product of methane, as well as nitrous oxide (N_{2}O) and hydrogen sulfide (H_{2}S) which are potential atmospheric biosignatures. SO_{2}, a gas related to volcanism may reveal present or recent volcanic activity on Mars.

== See also ==
- Astrobiology
- Compact Reconnaissance Imaging Spectrometer for Mars, a spectrometer on the Mars Reconnaissance Orbiter
- ExoMars programme
- Jovian Infrared Auroral Mapper, a spectrometer aboard Juno Jupiter orbiter
- Life on Mars
- Martian atmosphere
- Water on Mars
