= Silylidyne =

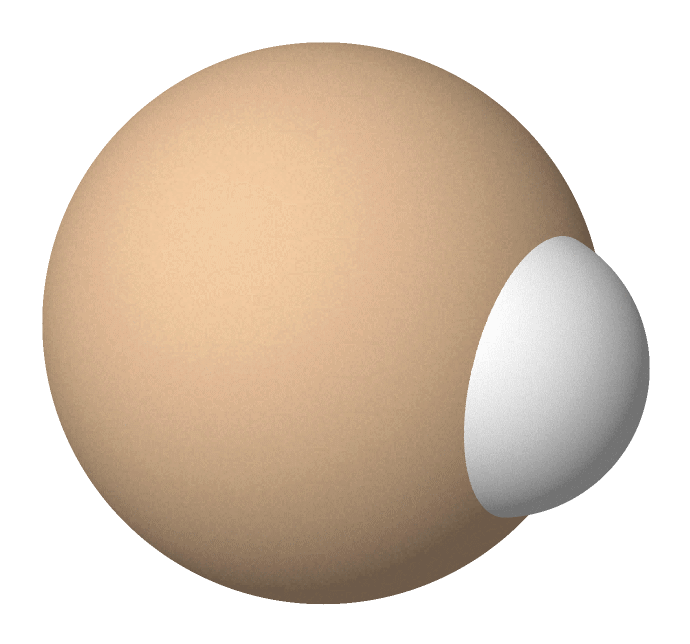

Names
- IUPAC name Silylidyne
- Systematic IUPAC name λ^{1}-silane
- Other names Hydridosilicon, Silylidine

Identifiers
CAS Number	13774-94-2
3D model (JSmol)	Interactive image
ChEBI	CHEBI:30580
ChemSpider	4937345
Gmelin Reference	254
PubChem CID	6432086
- InChI: InChI=1S/HSi/h1H Key: QHGSGZLLHBKSAH-UHFFFAOYSA-N
- SMILES: [SiH]

Properties
Chemical formula	HSi
Molar mass	29.093 g·mol^{−1}
- Except where otherwise noted, data are given for materials in their standard state (at 25 °C [77 °F], 100 kPa). Infobox references

Silylidyne is a chemical substance occurring as a molecule found in stars and probably existing in interstellar space, or as a monolayer on the surface of solid silicon. The SiH molecule is a radical, and can be made experimentally by striking an electric arc to silicon on a low pressure hydrogen gas.

== Surface ==
As a surface layer, silicon hydrides form when the silicon is cleaned with hydrofluoric acid. These hydrides decompose to SiH when heated to 750 K. Other ways to coat a silicon surface in hydrogen is via reaction with atomic hydrogen, or hot silane. A (111) crystal face will become covered in the pure monohydride, but other faces on a silicon crystal will also have the dihydride and trihydride groups.

== Group ==
The silylidyne group, not to be confused with silylyne, is a ≡SiH group that is bonded with a triple bond. The hydrogen can be substituted by other groups to make a more generic family of silylidynes. It is known as a ligand on molybdenum.

== Natural occurrence ==
Silylidyne in space was first noticed in sun spots in 1933. Later on it was found on the solar disk, photosphere, and in cool stars. Mira variable stars of type M or S may have emission lines of SiH. In even cooler brown dwarfs and planets, SiH is not found, but instead silicon takes form as silicon monoxide at low pressures, and SiH_{4} at high pressures. Minute amounts of SiH as a transient species may be found in these bodies as SiO and SiH_{4} react with water.

== Properties ==
The Si-H bond strength is 80 kcal/mol.

=== Spectrum ===
The most prominent spectral band is due to A^{2}Δ → X^{2}Π transitions. Higher level excited states are the B^{2}Σ^{−} and C^{2}Σ^{+}, D^{2}Δ, E^{2}Σ^{+}.

The life time of the molecules in the A state is 530 nanoseconds. They decay to the X ground state.
