= Telluric contamination =

Contamination of astronomical spectra by the Earth's atmosphere

Telluric contamination is contamination of the astronomical spectra by the Earth's atmosphere.

== Interference with astronomical observations ==
Most astronomical observations are conducted by measuring photons (electromagnetic waves) which originate beyond the sky. The molecules in the Earth's atmosphere, however, absorb and emit their own light, especially in the visible and near-IR portion of the spectrum, and any ground-based observation is subject to contamination from these telluric (earth-originating) sources. Water vapor and oxygen are two of the more important molecules in telluric contamination. Contamination by water vapor was particularly pronounced in the Mount Wilson solar Doppler measurements.

Many scientific telescopes have spectrographs, which measure photons as a function of wavelength or frequency, with typical resolution on the order of a nanometer of visible light. Spectroscopic observations can be used in myriad contexts, including measuring the chemical composition and physical properties of astronomical objects as well as measuring object velocities from the Doppler shift of spectral lines. Unless they are corrected for, telluric contamination can produce errors or reduce precision in such data.

Telluric contamination can also be important for photometric measurements.

== Telluric correction ==
It is possible to correct for the effects of telluric contamination in an astronomical spectrum. This is done by preparing a telluric correction function, made by dividing a model spectrum of a star by an observation of an astronomical photometric standard star. This function can then be multiplied by an astronomical observation at each wavelength point.

While this method can restore the original shape of the spectrum, the regions affected can be prone to high levels noise due to the low number of counts in that area of the spectrum.

== See also ==
- Pollution and light pollution
- Interferometry and astronomy
- Spectroscopy and spectrograph
