= Planetary Fourier Spectrometer =

An image of the interferometer used in the core of the Planetary Fourier Spectrometer

The Planetary Fourier Spectrometer (PFS) is an infrared spectrometer built by the Istituto Nazionale di Astrofisica (Italian National Institute for Astrophysics) along with the Istituto di Fisica dello spazio Interplanetario and the Consiglio Nazionale delle Ricerche (Italian National Research Council). The instrument is currently used by the European Space Agency on both the Mars Express Mission and the Venus Express Mission. It consists of four units which together weigh around 31.4 kg, including a pointing device, a power supply, a control unit, and an interferometer with electronics.

The main objective of the instrument is to provide temperature profiles of Mars's carbon dioxide atmosphere, and to the study composition of the planet's atmosphere through the infrared radiation that is reflected and emitted by the planet.

== Methane in the Martian atmosphere ==
In March 2004, Professor Vittorio Formisano, the researcher in charge of the Mars Express Planetary Fourier Spectrometer, announced the discovery of methane in the Martian atmosphere. However, methane cannot persist in the Martian atmosphere for more than a few hundred years since it can be broken down by sunlight. Thus, this discovery suggests that the methane is being continually replenished by some unidentified volcanic or geologic process, or that some kind of extremophile life form similar to some existing on Earth is metabolising carbon dioxide and hydrogen and producing methane. In July 2004, rumours began to circulate that Formisano would announce the discovery of ammonia at an upcoming conference. It later came to light that none had been found; in fact some noted that the PFS was not precise enough to distinguish ammonia from carbon dioxide anyway.

== See also ==
- Atmosphere of Mars
- ExoMars Trace Gas Orbiter
