= Trace Gas Orbiter =

Mars orbiter, part of ExoMars programme

- Artist's illustration of ExoMars 2016
- Mission type: Mars orbiter
- Operator: ESA · Roscosmos
- COSPAR ID: 2016-017A
- SATCAT no.: 41388
- Website: http://exploration.esa.int/jump.cfm?oid=46475
- Mission duration: Planned: 7 years Elapsed: 10 years, 8 months, 5 days

Spacecraft properties
- Manufacturer: Thales Alenia Space
- Launch mass: 4,332 kg
- Payload mass: Instruments: 113.8 kg (251 lb); Schiaparelli: 577 kg (1,272 lb)
- Dimensions: 3.2 × 2 × 2 m (10.5 × 6.6 × 6.6 ft)
- Power: ~2000 W

Start of mission
- Launch date: 14 March 2016, 09:31 UTC
- Rocket: Proton-M/Briz-M
- Launch site: Baikonur 200/39
- Contractor: Khrunichev

Orbital parameters
- Reference system: Areocentric
- Regime: Circular
- Eccentricity: 0
- Periareion altitude: 400 km (250 mi)
- Apoareion altitude: 400 km (250 mi)
- Inclination: 74 degrees
- Period: 2 hours
- Epoch: Planned

Mars orbiter
- Orbital insertion: 19 October 2016, 15:24 UTC

Transponders
- Band: X band UHF band
- Frequency: 390–450 MHz
- TWTA power: 65 W
Instruments
- NOMAD: Nadir and Occultation for Mars Discovery
- ACS: Atmospheric Chemistry Suite
- CaSSIS: Colour and Stereo Surface Imaging System
- FREND: Fine-Resolution Epithermal Neutron Detector
- ESA mission insignia for the ExoMars 2016 launch, featuring the Trace Gas Orbiter (left) and Schiaparelli (right) ExoMars programme

The ExoMars Trace Gas Orbiter (TGO or ExoMars Orbiter) is a collaborative project between the European Space Agency (ESA) and the Russian Roscosmos agency that sent an atmospheric research orbiter and the Schiaparelli demonstration lander to Mars in 2016 as part of the European-led ExoMars programme. A key goal is to gain a better understanding of methane (CH_{4}) and other trace gases present in the Martian atmosphere that could be evidence for possible biological activity.

Manufactured by Thales Alenia Space, TGO's major scientific payloads were developed by Belgium, France, Russia, and Switzerland. TGO launched on a Proton-M rocket from Baikonur Cosmodrome Site 200, in Kazakhstan, on 14 March 2016. The Trace Gas Orbiter delivered the Schiaparelli lander on 16 October, which crashed on the surface due to a premature release of the parachute. TGO has been orbiting Mars since 19 October 2016 and performing science observations of the planet since April 2018.

The ExoMars programme will continue with the Rosalind Franklin rover in 2028, which will search for biomolecules and biosignatures; the TGO will operate as the communication link for the lander and rover and provide communication for other Mars surface probes with Earth.

== Spacecraft ==
Dimensions	The central bus is 3.2 m × 2 m × 2 m (10.5 ft × 6.6 ft × 6.6 ft)
Propulsion	424 N (95 lbf) bi-propellant main engine, used for Mars orbit insertion and manoeuvres
Power	20 m^{2} (220 sq ft) solar arrays spanning 17.5 m (57 ft) tip-to-tip, and capable of rotating in one axis; generates about 2,000 W of power at Mars
Batteries	2 modules of lithium-ion batteries with approximately 5100 watt hours total capacity to provide power during eclipses over the prime mission
Communication	2.2 m (7 ft 3 in) X band high-gain antenna with a two-axis pointing mechanism and 65 W RF travelling-wave tube amplifier to communicate with Earth Two Electra UHF band transceivers with a single helical antenna to communicate with spacecraft at Mars
Thermal control	Spacecraft yaw axis control to ensure the three faces containing the science payload remain cold
Mass	3,755 kg (8,278 lb), wet mass of the orbiter 4,332 kg (9,550 lb), wet mass of the orbiter plus Schiaparelli lander
Payload	113.8 kg (251 lb) of science instruments

== Instruments ==
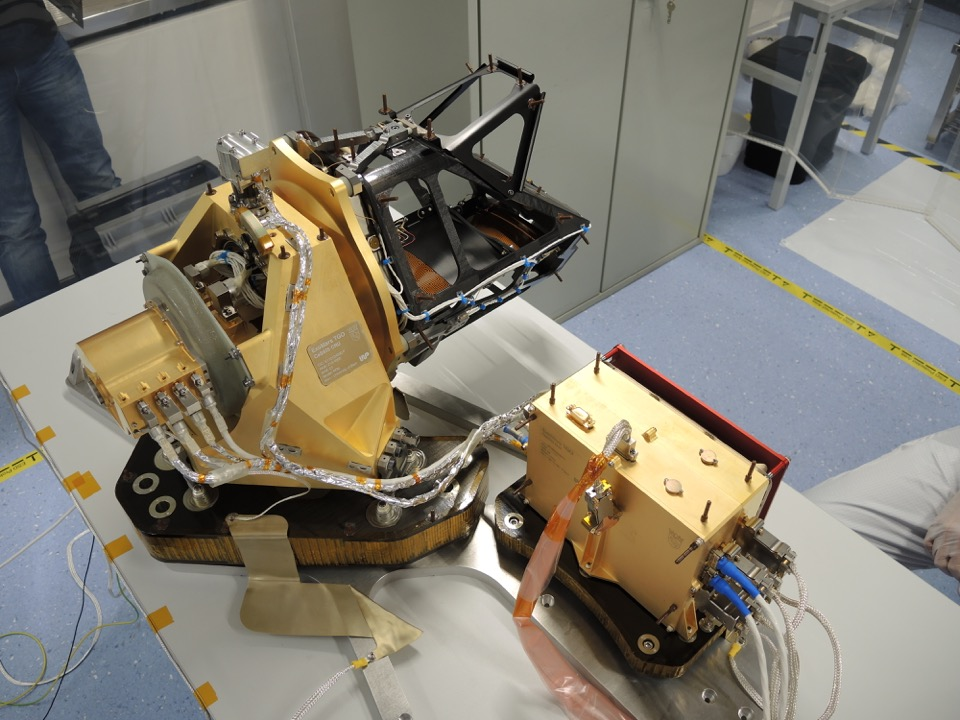
Colour and Stereo Surface Imaging System (CaSSIS)

Like the Mars Reconnaissance Orbiter, the Trace Gas Orbiter is a hybrid science and telecom orbiter. Its scientific payload mass is about 113.8 kg (251 lb) and consists of:

- The Nadir and Occultation for Mars Discovery (NOMAD) has two infrared and one ultraviolet spectrometer channels. Developed by Belgium.
- The Atmospheric Chemistry Suite (ACS) has three infrared spectrometer channels. Developed by France and Russia.
- The Colour and Stereo Surface Imaging System (CaSSIS) is a high-resolution, 4.5 m per pixel (15 ft/pixel), colour stereo camera for building accurate digital elevation models of the Martian surface. It will also be an important tool for characterising candidate landing site locations for future missions. Developed by Switzerland.
- The Fine-Resolution Epithermal Neutron Detector (FREND) is a neutron detector that can provide information on the presence of hydrogen, in the form of water or hydrated minerals, in the top 1 m (3 ft 3 in) of the Martian surface. Developed by Russia.

NOMAD and ACS are providing the most extensive spectral coverage of Martian atmospheric processes so far. Twice per orbit, at local sunrise and sunset, they are able to observe the Sun as it shines through the atmosphere. Detection of atmospheric trace species at the parts-per-billion (ppb) level are possible.

== Science goals ==
The FREND instrument is mapping hydrogen levels to a maximum depth of 1 m (3 ft 3 in) beneath the Martian surface. Locations where hydrogen is found may indicate water-ice deposits, which could be useful for future crewed missions.

Particularly, the mission is characterising spatial, temporal variation, and localisation of sources for a broad list of atmospheric trace gases. If methane (CH_{4}) is found in the presence of propane (C_{3}H_{8}) or ethane (C_{2}H_{6}), that would be a strong indication that biological processes are involved. However, if methane is found in the presence of gases such as sulfur dioxide (SO_{2}), that would be an indication that the methane is a byproduct of geological processes.

=== Detection ===
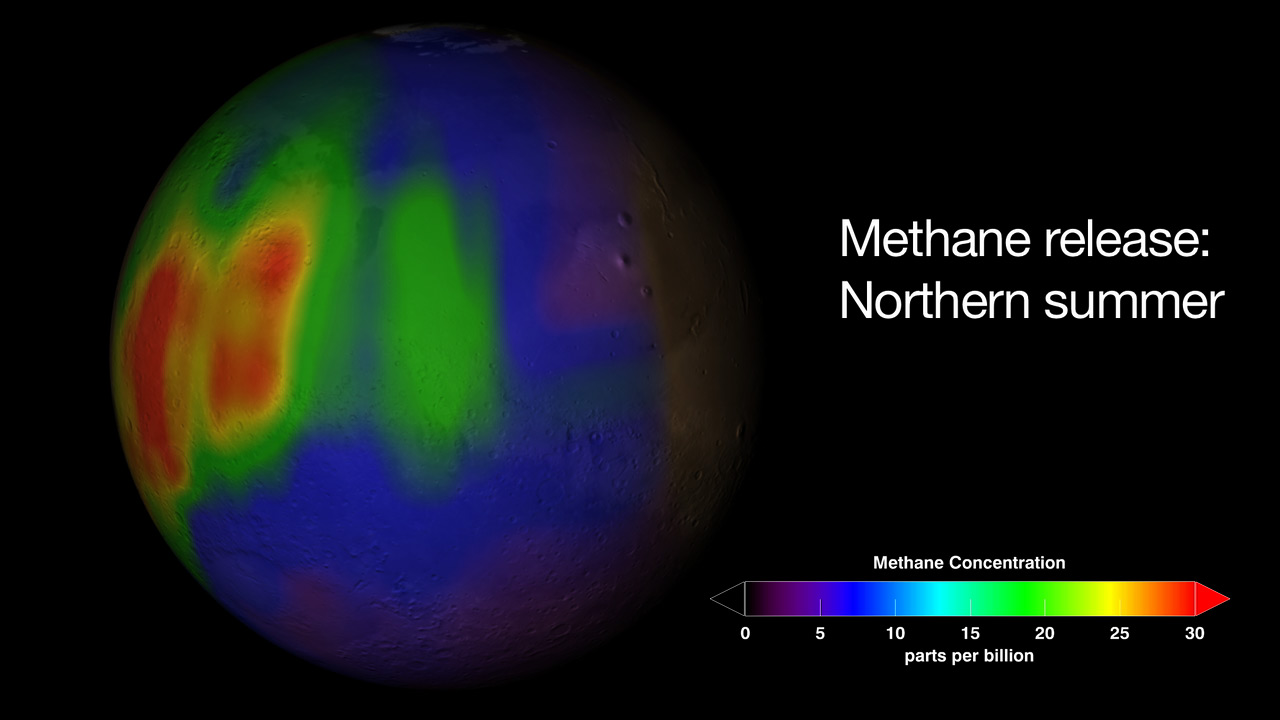
Visualisation of a methane plume found in Mars's atmosphere during the northern summer season

The nature of the methane source requires measurements of a suite of trace gases in order to characterise potential biochemical and geochemical processes at work. The orbiter has very high sensitivity to (at least) the following molecules and their isotopomers: water (H_{2}O), hydroperoxyl (HO_{2}), nitrogen dioxide (NO_{2}), nitrous oxide (N_{2}O), methane (CH_{4}), acetylene (C_{2}H_{2}), ethylene (C_{2}H_{4}), ethane (C_{2}H_{6}), formaldehyde (H_{2}CO), hydrogen cyanide (HCN), hydrogen sulfide (H_{2}S), carbonyl sulfide (OCS), sulfur dioxide (SO_{2}), hydrogen chloride (HCl), carbon monoxide (CO) and ozone (O_{3}). Detection sensitivities are at levels of 100 parts per trillion, improved to 10 parts per trillion or better by averaging spectra which could be taken at several spectra per second.

=== Characterisation ===
- Spatial and temporal variability: latitude–longitude coverage multiple times in a Mars year to determine regional sources and seasonal variations (reported to be large, but still controversial with present understanding of Mars gas-phase photochemistry)
- Correlation of concentration observations with environmental parameters of temperature, dust and ice aerosols (potential sites for heterogeneous chemistry)

=== Localisation ===
- Mapping of multiple tracers (e.g., aerosols, water vapour, CO, CH_{4}) with different photochemical lifetimes and correlations helps constrain model simulations and points to source/sink regions
- To achieve the spatial resolution required to localise sources might require tracing molecules at parts-per-billion concentrations

== Relay telecommunications ==
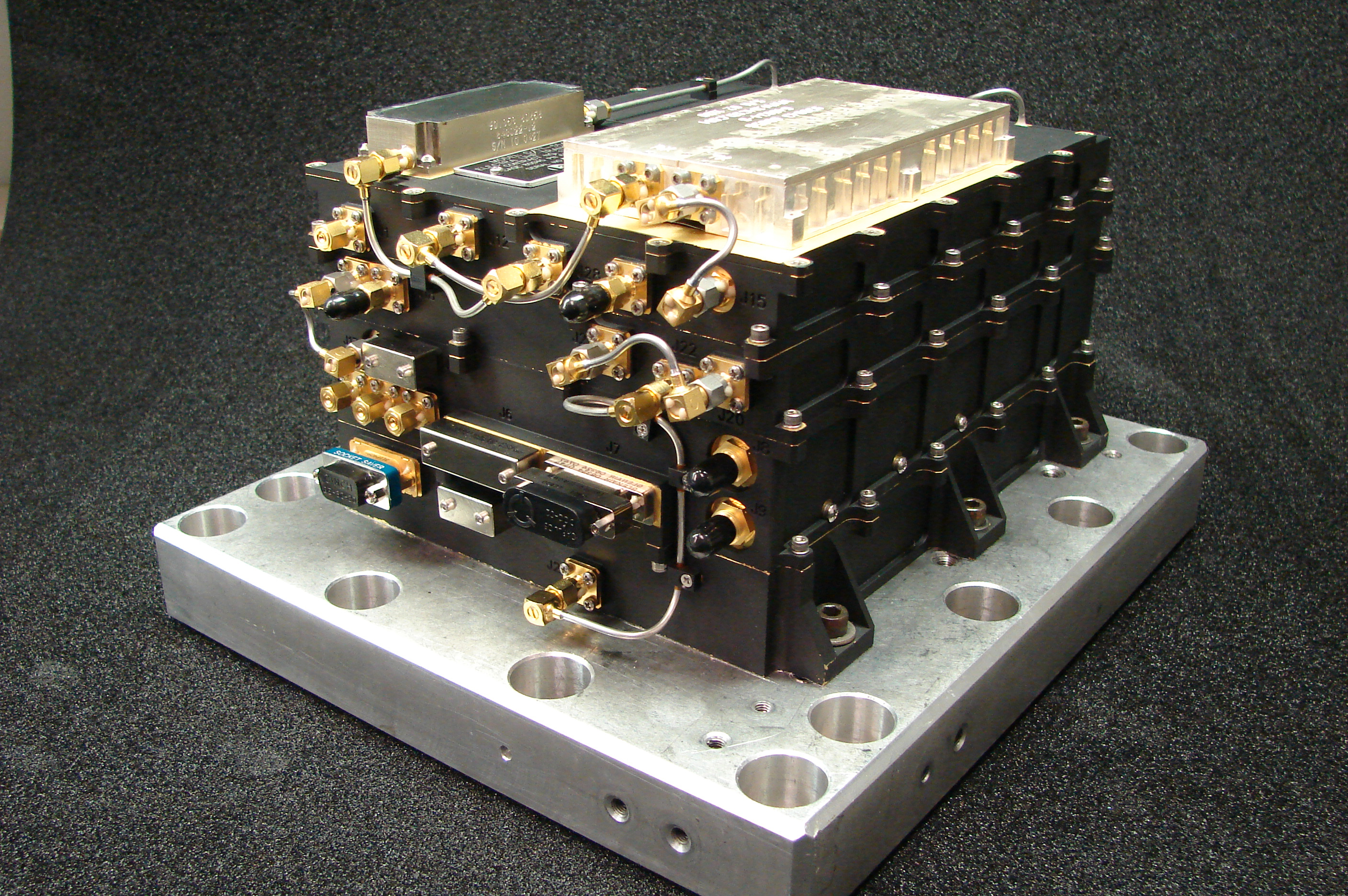
An Electra radio, in this case the one for the MAVEN probe. Electra radios were also deployed on TGO and on other Mars telecommunications assets.

Due to the challenges of entry, descent and landing, Mars landers are highly constrained in mass, volume and power. For landed missions, this places severe constraints on antenna size and transmission power, which in turn greatly reduce direct-to-Earth communication capability in comparison to orbital spacecraft. As an example, the capability downlinks on Spirit and Opportunity rovers had only 1/600 the capability of the Mars Reconnaissance Orbiter downlink.

Relay communication addresses this problem by allowing Mars surface spacecraft to communicate using higher data rates over short-range links to nearby Mars orbiters, while the orbiter takes on the task of communicating over the long-distance link back to Earth. This relay strategy offers a variety of key benefits to Mars landers: increased data return volume, reduced energy requirements, reduced communications system mass, increased communications opportunities, robust critical event communications and in situ navigation aid.

NASA provided an Electra telecommunications relay and navigation instrument to assure communications between probes and rovers on the surface of Mars and controllers on Earth.

The TGO will provide the Rosalind Franklin rover with telecommunications relay; it will also serve as a relay satellite for future lander missions.

== History ==
Size of TGO (left) with Schiaparelli attached, compared to Mars Express (right) and an average human

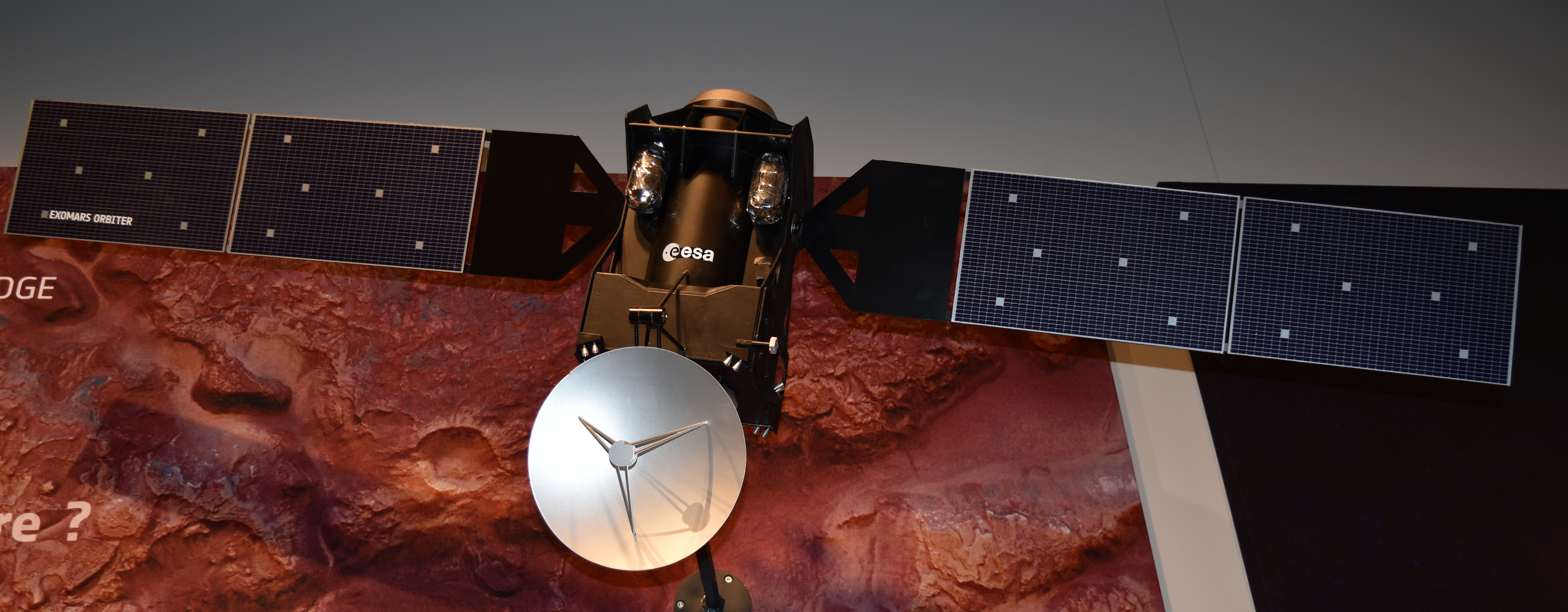
Scale model of TGO displayed during the Paris Air Show, 2015

Investigations with space and Earth-based observatories have demonstrated the presence of a small amount of methane on the atmosphere of Mars that seems to vary with location and time. This may indicate the presence of microbial life on Mars, or a geochemical process such as volcanism or hydrothermal activity.

The challenge to discern the source of methane in the atmosphere of Mars prompted the independent planning by ESA and NASA of one orbiter each that would carry instruments in order to determine if its formation is of biological or geological origin, as well as its decomposition products such as formaldehyde and methanol.

=== Origins ===
ExoMars Trace Gas Orbiter was born out of the nexus of ESA's Aurora programme ExoMars flagship and NASA's 2013 and 2016 Mars Science Orbiter (MSO) concepts. It became a flexible collaborative proposal within NASA and ESA to send a new orbiter-carrier to Mars in 2016 as part of the European-led ExoMars mission. On the ExoMars side, ESA authorised about half a billion Euros in 2005 for a rover and mini-station; eventually this evolved into being delivered by an orbiter rather than a cruise stage.

=== Attempted collaboration with NASA ===
NASA's Mars Science Orbiter (MSO) was originally envisioned in 2008 as an all-NASA endeavour aiming for a late 2013 launch. NASA and ESA officials agreed to pool resources and technical expertise and collaborate to launch only one orbiter. The agreement, called the Mars Exploration Joint Initiative, was signed in July 2009 and proposed to use an Atlas rocket launcher instead of a Soyuz rocket, which significantly altered the technical and financial setting of the European ExoMars mission.

Since the rover was originally planned to be launched along with the TGO, a prospective agreement would require that the rover lose enough weight to fit aboard the Atlas launch vehicle with NASA's orbiter. Instead of reducing the rover's mass, it was nearly doubled when the mission was combined with other projects to a multi-spacecraft programme divided over two Atlas V launches: the ExoMars Trace Gas Orbiter (TGO) was merged into the project, carrying a meteorological lander planned for launch in 2016. The European orbiter would carry several instruments originally meant for NASA's MSO, so NASA scaled down the objectives and focused on atmospheric trace gases detection instruments for their incorporation in ESA's ExoMars Trace Gas Orbiter.

Under the FY2013 budget President Barack Obama released on 13 February 2012, NASA terminated its participation in ExoMars due to budgetary cuts in order to pay for the cost overruns of the James Webb Space Telescope. With NASA's funding for this project cancelled, most of ExoMars's plans had to be restructured.

=== Collaboration with Russia ===
On 15 March 2012, the ESA's ruling council announced it would press ahead with its ExoMars program in partnership with the Russian space agency Roscosmos, which planned to contribute two heavy-lift Proton launch vehicles and an additional entry, descent and landing system to the 2020 rover mission.

Under the collaboration proposal with Roscosmos, the ExoMars mission was split into two parts: the orbiter/lander mission in March 2016 that includes the TGO and a 2.4 m (7 ft 10 in) diameter stationary lander built by ESA named Schiaparelli, and the Rosalind Franklin rover mission in 2020. Both missions were expected to use a Proton-M rocket. The Rosalind Franklin rover mission was later postponed and in 2022, after Russian invasion of Ukraine, ESA terminated its cooperation on the project with Russia.

=== Launch ===
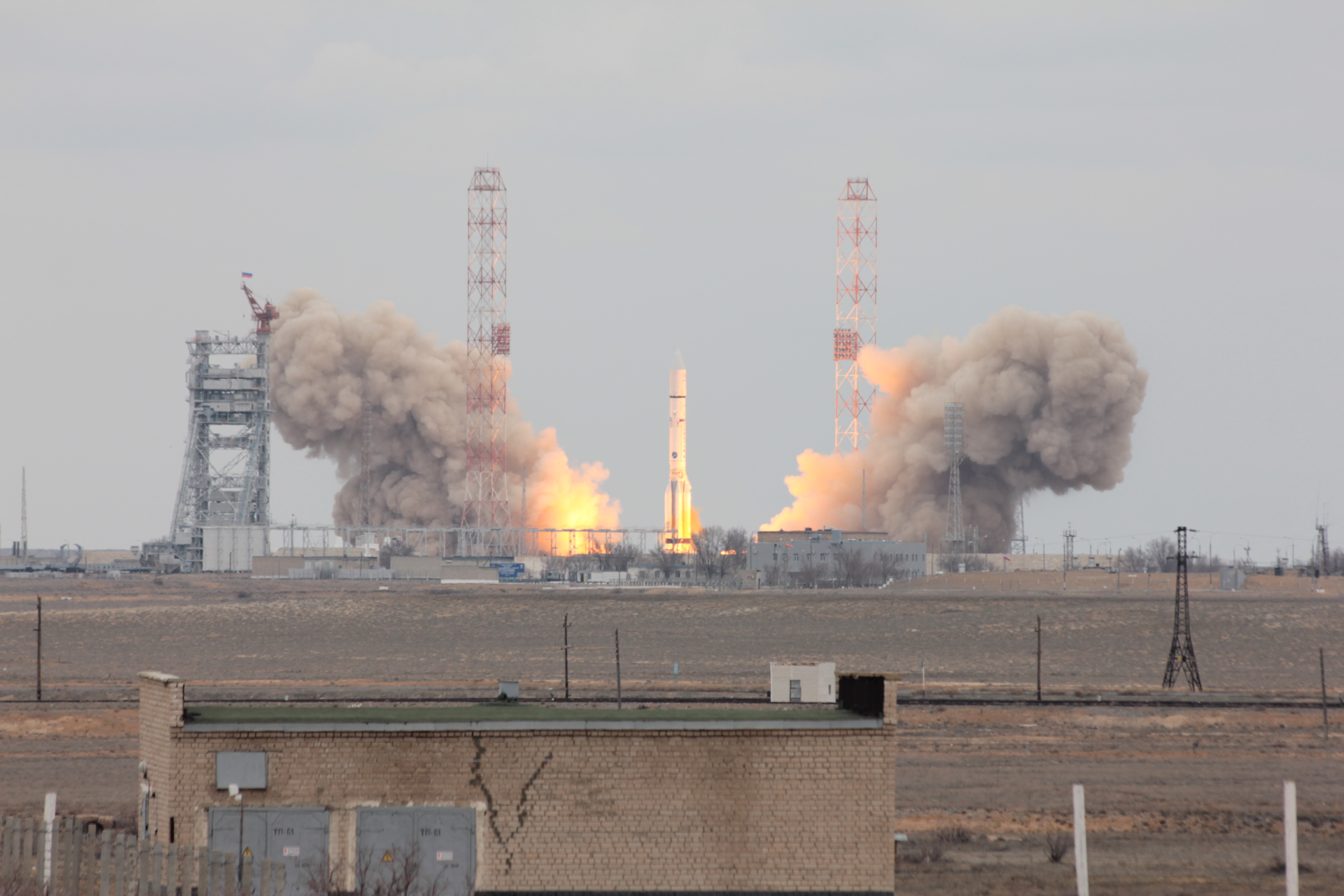
Launch of the Proton rocket with TGO

Animation of TGO's trajectory Sun · Earth · Mars · ExoMars Trace Gas Orbiter

Animation of TGO's trajectory around Mars Mars · ExoMars Trace Gas Orbiter

The Trace Gas Orbiter and descent module Schiaparelli completed testing and were integrated to a Proton rocket at the Baikonur Cosmodrome in Kazakhstan in mid-January 2016. The launch occurred at 09:31 UTC on 14 March 2016. Four rocket burns occurred in the following 10 hours before the descent module and orbiter were released. A signal from the spacecraft was received at 21:29 UTC that day, confirming that the launch was successful and the spacecraft were functioning properly.

Shortly after separation from the probes, a Brazilian ground telescope recorded small objects in the vicinity of the Briz-M upper booster stage, suggesting that the Briz-M stage exploded a few kilometres away, without damaging the orbiter or lander. Briefing reporters in Moscow, the head of Roscosmos denied any anomaly and made all launch data available for inspection.

=== At Mars ===
The Schiaparelli lander separated from the TGO orbiter on 16 October 2016, three days before it arrived on Mars, and entered the atmosphere at 21,000 km/h (13,000 mph; 5.8 km/s). Schiaparelli transmitted about 600 megabytes of telemetry during its landing attempt, before it impacted the surface at 540 km/h (340 mph).

The TGO was injected into Mars orbit on 19 October 2016 and underwent 11 months of aerobraking (March 2017 to February 2018), reducing its orbital speed by 3,600 km/h (2,200 mph) and its orbit from an initial 98,000 by 200 km (60,890 by 120 mi) down to 1,050 by 200 km (650 by 120 mi). Additional thruster firings through mid-April circularised the spacecraft's orbit to 400 km (250 mi), and full science activities began on 21 April 2018.

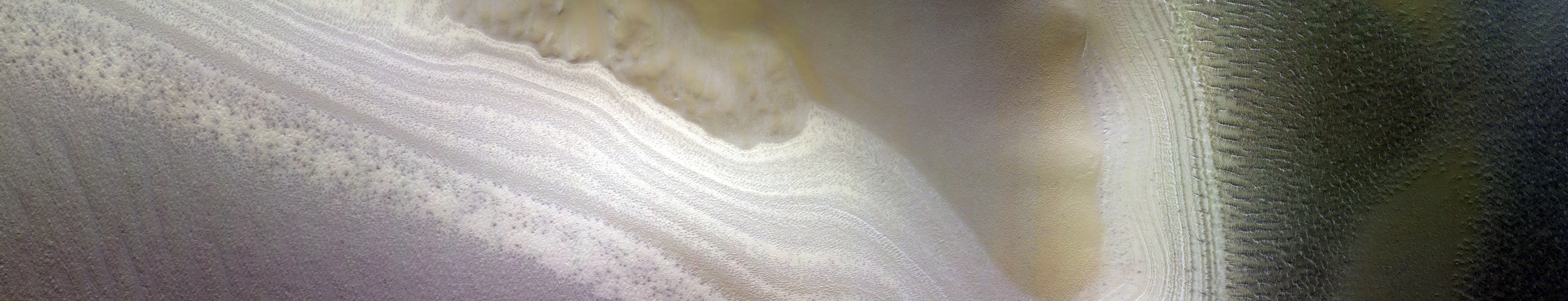
Image of the edge of Planum Australe, Mars's south polar ice cap, taken by CaSSIS. The dusty ice layers that compose the South Polar Layered Deposits are exposed and visible in the image.

=== First results ===
The spacecraft took its first photos of the surface of Mars on 15 April 2018. The first year of science operations yielded a wealth of new data and scientific discoveries, including: new observations of the atmospheric composition and structure, water-ice cloud enhancement during a global dust storm, new measurements of the atmospheric thermal structure and density, estimations of the timespan of the climate record of the south polar ice sheet, confirmation of dry-processes being responsible for Recurring Slope Lineae in Hale crater, identifying a variety of ice and non-ice related active processes occurring on the surface in colour, and high-resolution maps of shallow subsurface Hydrogen, increasing the known amounts of probably near-surface buried water ice.

In April 2019, the science team reported their first methane results: TGO had detected no methane whatsoever, even though their data were more sensitive than the methane concentrations found using Curiosity, Mars Express, and ground-based observations. As of 2021, still no methane was detected and scientists used the TGO measurements to set new upper limit on its possible concentration in the atmosphere of Mars (less than 0.05 ppbv and likely less than 0.02 ppbv). Also, no localised plumes of methane were detected.

=== 2020 ===
In 2020, scientists reported the first detection of green oxygen airglow in Mars's atmosphere. For this they used the TGO's NOMAD instrument pointing at the edge of Mars, similarly to analogous observations of Earth airglow from the ISS.

Since 2020, TGO has been cooperating with Mars Express on mutual radio occultation experiments measuring the physical properties of Mars atmosphere. A publication of a study in 2024 in Radio Science marked the first routine use of this technique at another planet and in June 2025, a comprehensive data set from these observations has been made publicly available.

=== 2021 ===
In February 2021, using data from TGO's ACS and NOMAD instruments, scientists reported on the discovery of transient hydrogen chloride (HCl) in Martian atmosphere, the first detection of a halogen gas on Mars. The distribution of the observations pointed to a non-volcanic explanation and the authors proposed that HCl is formed when salty dust is lifted into the atmosphere by wind during dust storms and reacts with atmospheric water to release chlorine, which in turn reacts with hydrogen-containing molecules.

In the same issue of Science Advances, another team using data from NOMAD reported a dramatic variability in deuterium to hydrogen (D/H) ratio of water vapour along altitude across the whole planet. These observations are consistent with large amounts of water being lost over time. TGO also observed multiple instances of accelerated water loss from the atmosphere, all associated with storms and seasonal changes.

=== 2022 ===
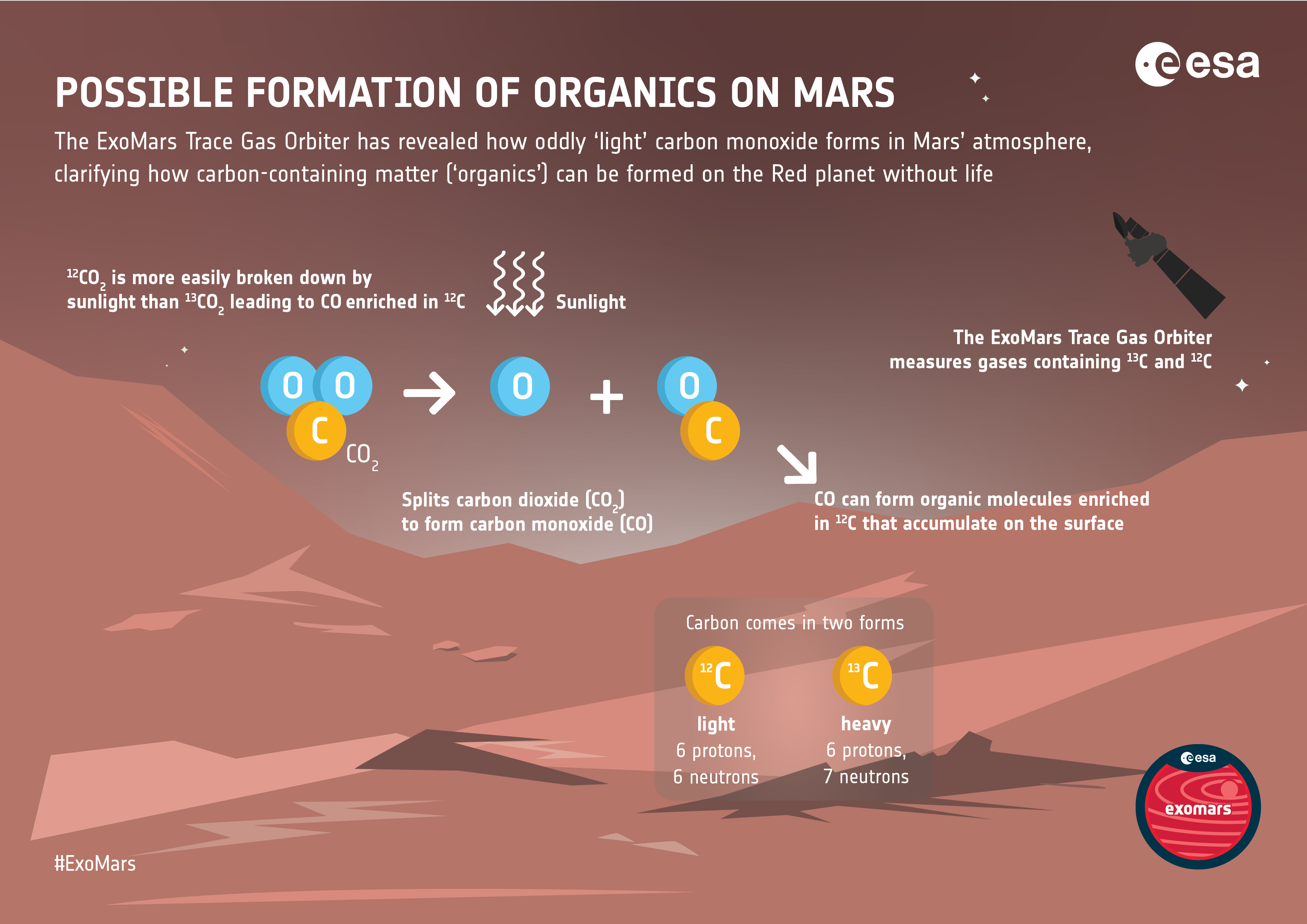
How oddly light carbon monoxide forms in Mars's atmosphere

Data gathered by the NOMAD instrument in 2022 helped explain the unusual depletion of heavy carbon (^{13}C) in rocks studied by NASA's Curiosity rover, which were considered as a potential biomarker of past life on Mars. Instead, using the TGO measurements, scientists proposed an abiotic mechanism, where CO_{2} in the atmosphere interact with sunlight and break apart to form CO that is depleted in heavy carbon.

=== 2023 ===
In August 2023, TGO as well as EMM and MRO observed an anomalous out-of-season dust storm in northern summer near the Antoniadi crater north-west of Syrtis Major. The observations from the three orbiters have shown that the storm triggered an intense injection of water vapor into the atmosphere, up to 60–80 km, and subsequent increase in hydrogen escape. These results, published in 2026, show that massive water loss events can be caused by local dust storms at any time of year, not only in southern summer as assumed before.

=== 2024 ===
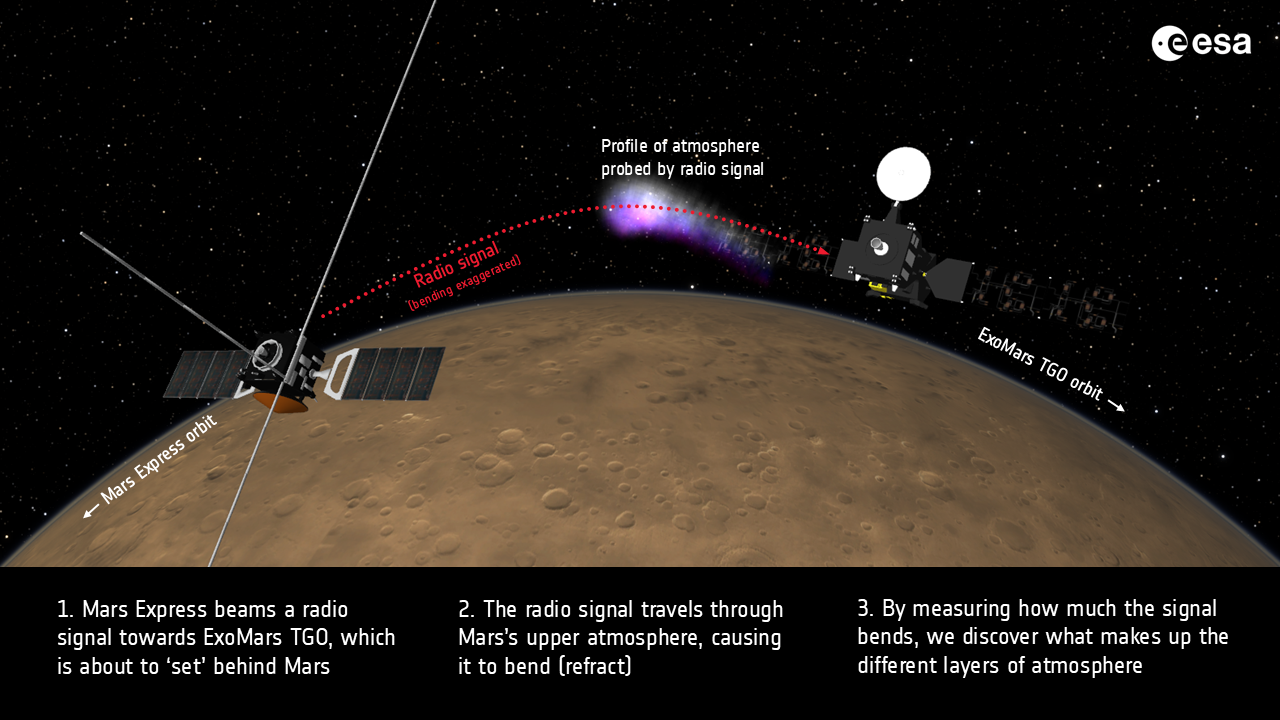
Mars Express and TGO probe Mars's atmosphere by radio occultation

During May 2024 solar storms, Mars Express and TGO were performing radio occultation experiments and managed to measure the response of the Martian atmosphere to the solar storm. The two orbiters observed a dramatic increase in electrons in two distinct layers of the atmosphere with a 45% increase in 110 km above surface and a 278% increase in 130 km.

In 2024, scientists published a global dataset of potential chloride deposits on Mars based on color-infrared observations by TGO's CaSSIS camera. They identified 965 chloride deposit candidates with diameters between 300 and 3,000 m, which likely formed by evaporation of shallow ponds of water or brine.

=== 2025 ===
TGO observes the interstellar comet 3I/ATLAS on 3 October 2025

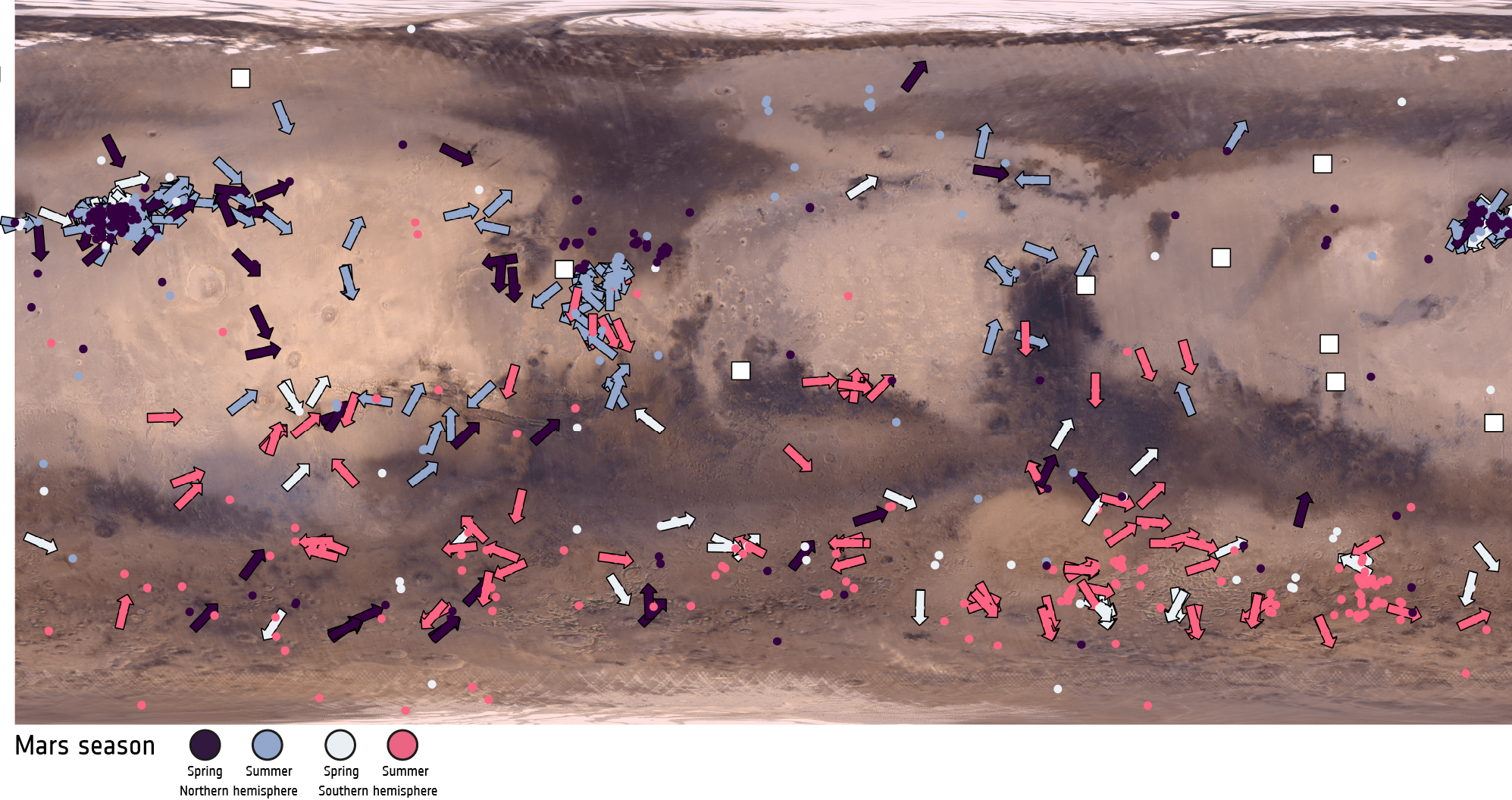
Tracking dust devils on Mars

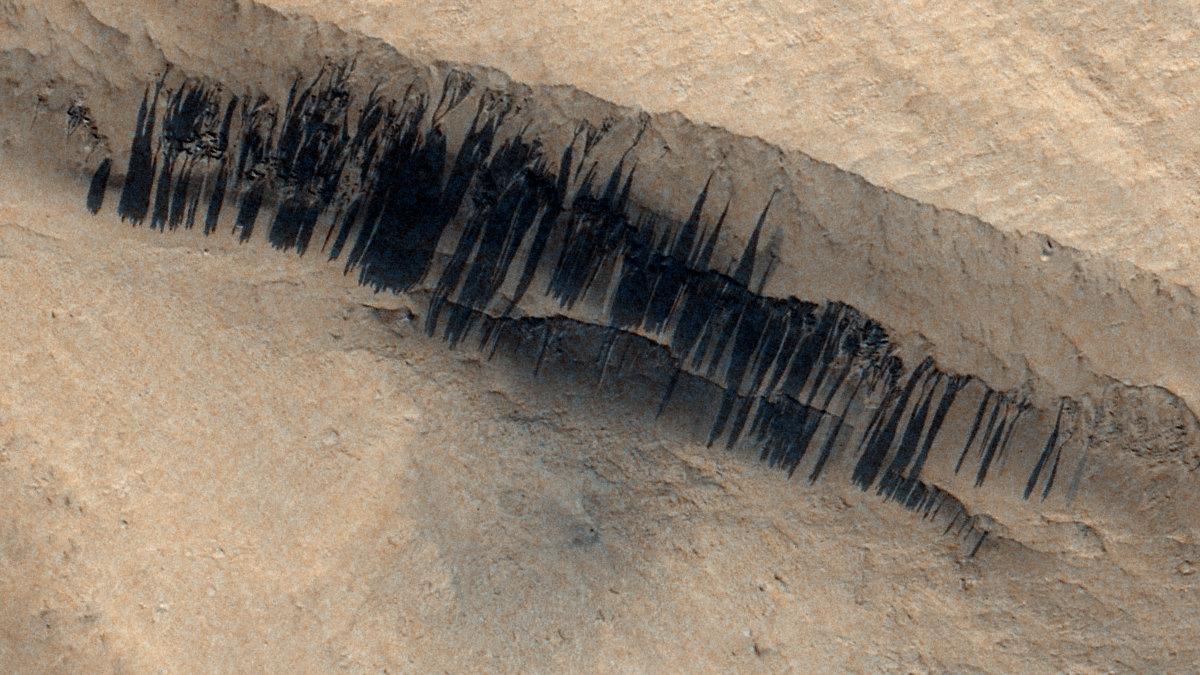
Streaks triggered by a meteoroid impact on the edge of Apollinaris Mons

A large scale study published in 2025 in Nature Communications using global imagery from MRO and TGO concluded that Recurring Slope Lineae form without liquid water all over Mars. They most likely form when layers of fine dust slide off steep slopes after triggering by falling rocks, meteoroid impacts, or wind gusts.

Combined measurements from TGO's Atmospheric Chemistry Suite and MRO's Mars Climate Sounder revealed a seasonal ozone layer on Mars, formed by low temperatures of the north polar vortex. This discovery was presented in September 2025 at a joint EPSC-DPS meeting.

Using observations from TGO, MRO, and Mars Express, scientists described repeated clay-bearing layers of varying thickness throughout Oxia Planum, the planned landing site of the Rosalind Franklin rover. These clays have likely originated elsewhere before being transported to the Oxia basin by rivers running from the highlands northwest of the region. This means that the landing site of Rosalind Franklin may represent a far wider range of ancient Martian climate history than previously believed. These results were also presented at the 2025 EPSC-DPS meeting.

On 19 September 2025, scientists published the highest resolution images of the atmosphere above the limb of Mars ever taken, revealing details about the hazy edge of the planet's atmosphere. These images, likened to a mille-feuille dessert due to their many thin layers of ice (above 40 km) and dust (below 40 km), were taken on 21 January 2024 over Terra Cimmeria by TGO's CaSSIS stereo camera and have a spatial resolution of 18 metres per pixel. ESA announced plans to carry out such observations once a month during future operations of TGO.

Between 1 and 7 October 2025, TGO observed the interstellar comet 3I/ATLAS using its CaSSIS instrument. During its closest approach to Mars on 3 October, the comet was 30 million km away. These observations were later used by ESA's Near-Earth Object Coordination Centre to predict the comet's path, resulting in a ten-fold increase in accuracy. This was the first time that astrometric data from a spacecraft at another planet have been accepted in the Minor Planet Center's database.

In October 2025, scientists published a catalogue of 1,039 Martian dust devils observed by TGO and Mars Express during past two decades. Their analyses show near-surface wind speeds of up to 44 m/s, faster than ever observed by surface probes.

A study published in Nature Communications in November 2025 associated over 2 million dark slope streaks observed on Mars between 2006 and 2024 by MRO with their possible drivers and concluded that most are caused by seasonal changes in dust delivery and wind stress. However, the study also identified rare cases when formation of the streaks was caused by meteoroid impacts. One of such cases was documented by TGO's CaSSIS instrument in late 2023 on the edge of Apollinaris Mons. The study also concluded that the best condition for the seasonal formation of dark streaks occur shortly after sunrise and shortly before sunset, which explains the lack of direct observations of these events so far. TGO is among only a few orbiters capable of sunrise and sunset imaging and attempts at capturing the events are underway.

=== 2026 ===
Researchers from the University of Bern used observations by TGO's CaSSIS as well as from MRO to map the drainage channels on a promontory in southeast Coprates Chasma including three "scarp-fronted deposits" interpreted as river deltas. This allowed them to determine the sea level of the global ocean on Mars between the late Hesperian and the early Amazonian, corresponding to an ocean of at least the size of Earth's Arctic Ocean. The results were published in the npj Space Exploration journal in January 2026.

TGO observations were used to track seasonal hydrogen chloride gas emissions to their source in young, narrow tectonic fissures around Alba Mons, potentially indicating a dormant magma chamber below the volcano. The gas accumulates during the winter, when the fissures are sealed by ice, and is released in early summer when the ice sublimates. This was interpreted as a potential sign of very recent volcanism on Mars. The results were published on 4 November 2026 in the journal Science Advances.

== See also ==
- List of European Space Agency programmes and missions
- Curiosity (rover) – NASA rover exploring Mars since 2012
- List of missions to Mars
- Mars 2020 – Astrobiology Mars rover mission by NASA
- Mars Exploration Joint Initiative – International space agencies agreement about Mars exploration
- Mars Express – European orbiter mission to Mars (2003–present)
- Mars Global Surveyor – NASA orbiter mission to Mars (1996–2006)
- Mars Orbiter Mission – Indian orbiter mission to Mars (2013–2022)
- MAVEN – NASA Mars orbiter (2013–2025)
- Natural methane on Mars – Presence of methane on Mars
