= Yttrium(II) oxide =

Names
- Other names: Yttrium monoxide

Identifiers
CAS Number	12036-00-9
3D model (JSmol)	Interactive image
- InChI: InChI=1S/O.Y
- SMILES: O.[Y]

Properties
Chemical formula	YO
Molar mass	104.9 g/mol
Appearance	Dark brown solid

Structure
Crystal structure	Tetragonal

Related compounds
Related compounds	Yttrium(III) oxide
- Except where otherwise noted, data are given for materials in their standard state (at 25 °C [77 °F], 100 kPa). Infobox references

Yttrium(II) oxide or yttrium monoxide is a chemical compound with the formula YO. This chemical compound was first created in its solid form by pulsed laser deposition, using yttrium(III) oxide as the target at 350 °C. The film was deposited on calcium fluoride using a krypton monofluoride laser. This resulted in a 200 nm flim of yttrium monoxide.
