= Stellar archaeology =

Study of the early history of the universe

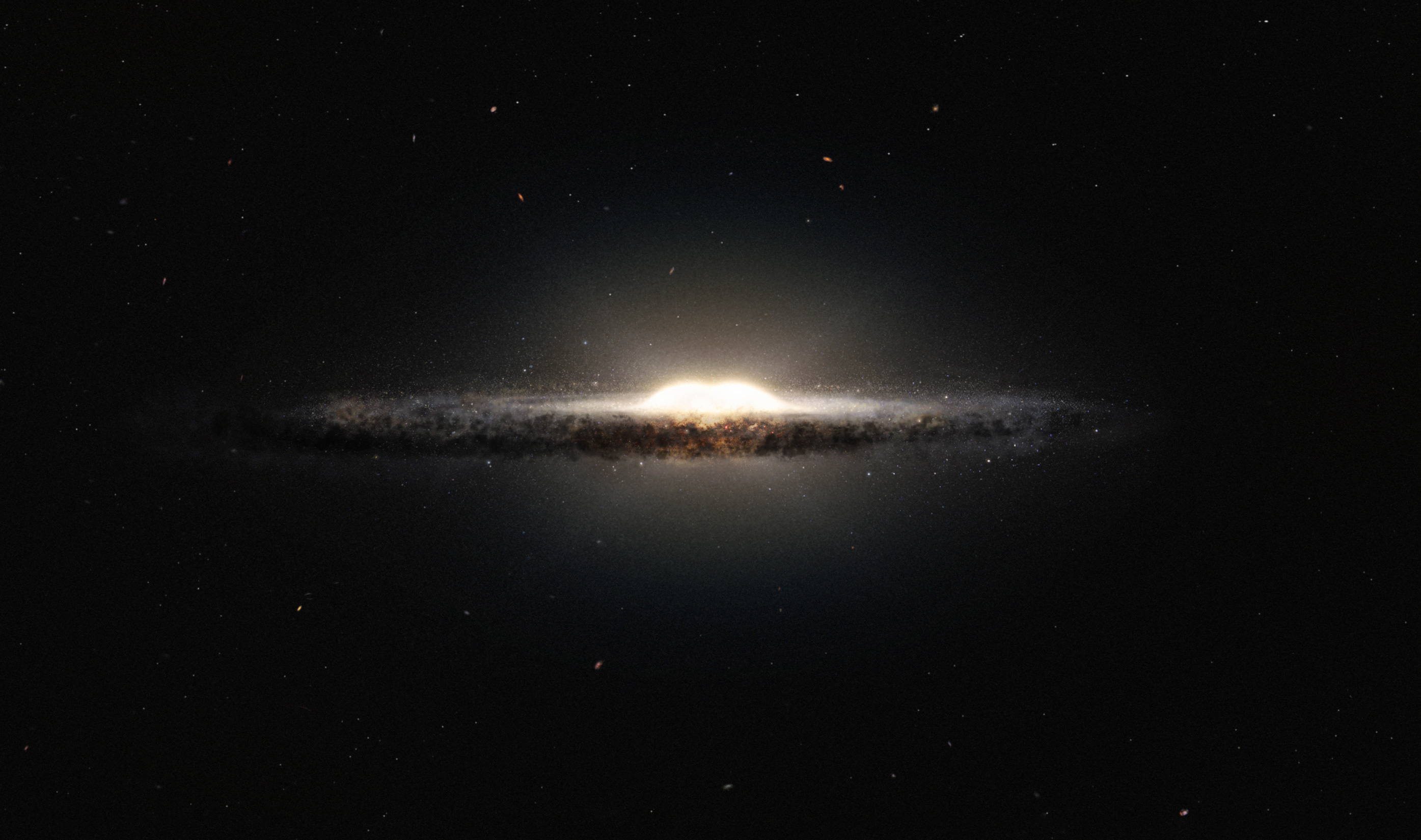
Artist's conception of the Milky Way

Stellar archaeology is the study of the early history of the universe, based on its early composition. By examining the chemical abundances of the earliest stars in the universe: metal-poor, Population II stars; insights are gained into their earlier, metal-free, Population III progenitors. This sheds light on such processes as galaxy formation and evolution, early star formation, nucleosynthesis in stars and supernovae, and the formation processes of the galactic halo. The field has already discovered that the Milky Way cannibalizes surrounding dwarf galaxies, giving it a youthful appearance.
