= Klim Churyumov =

Ukrainian astronomer and children's poet

- Клим Чурюмов
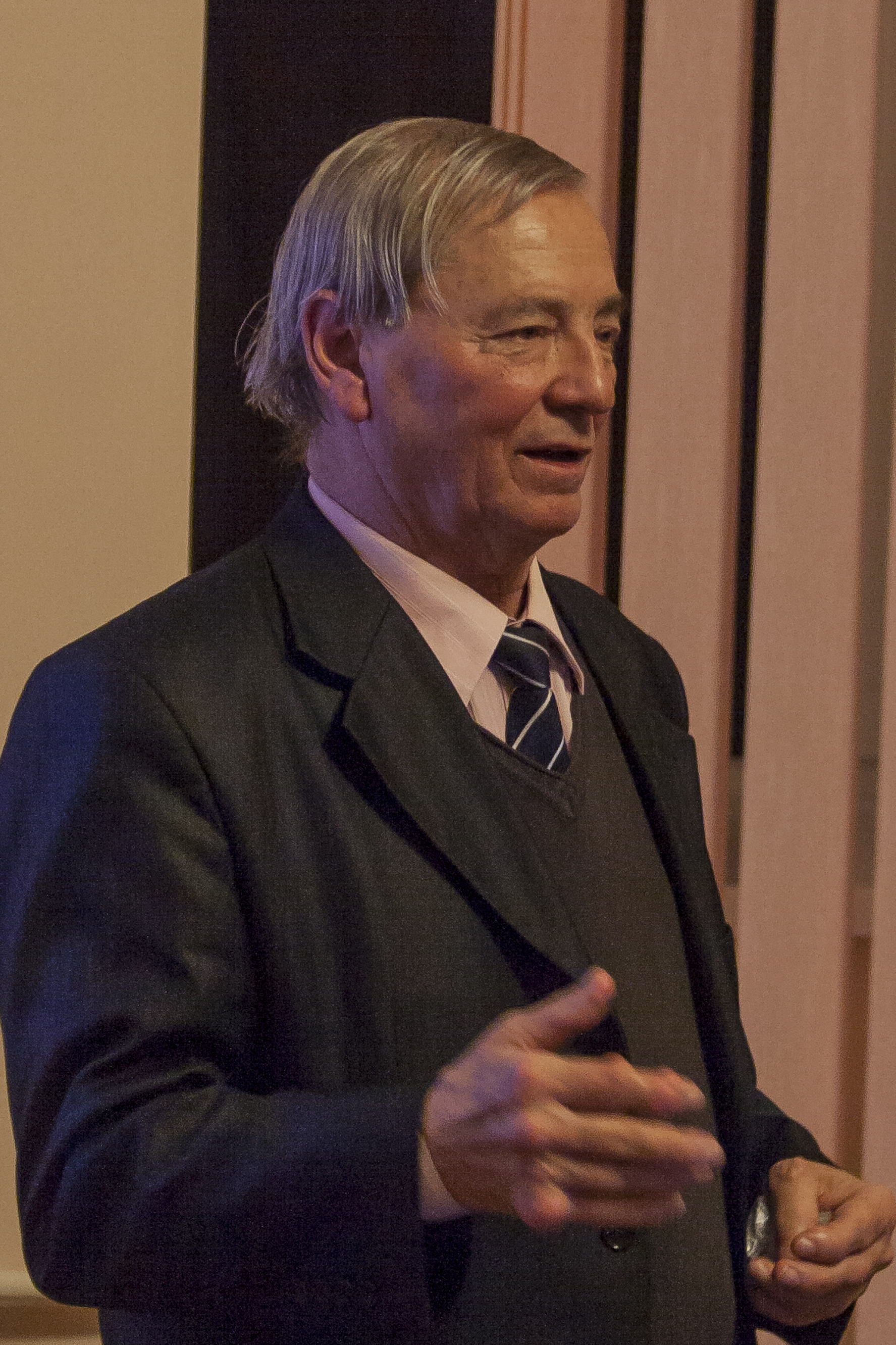
- Churyumov in 2014
- Born: Klim Ivanovich Churyumov; 19 February 1937; Mykolaiv, Ukrainian SSR, Soviet Union
- Died: 14 October 2016 (aged 79); Kharkiv, Ukraine
- Citizenship: Soviet Union → Ukraine
- Education: Taras Shevchenko National University of Kyiv
- Known for: research in physics of comets and the cosmogony of the Solar System, discovery of two comets.
- Awards: Order of Merit
- Scientific career
- Fields: Astronomy

Klim Ivanovich Churyumov (Ukrainian: Клим Іванович Чурюмов; 19 February 1937 – 14 October 2016) was a Soviet and Ukrainian astronomer.

He was the director of the Kyiv Planetarium, a member of the National Academy of Sciences of Ukraine and the International Astronomical Union, of the New York Academy of Sciences, the editor of the magazine Our Skies (Ukrainian: Наше Небо) in 2006–2009, the president of the Ukrainian Society of amateur astronomy and the author of books for children.

In 1969, he discovered, with Svetlana Gerasimenko, the comet 67P/Churyumov–Gerasimenko; on 12 November 2014, the Rosetta space mission landed its Philae spacecraft on its surface.

== Biography ==
He was the fourth of eight children of Ivan Ivanovich Churyumov and Antonina Mikhailovna Churyumova (b. 1907). His father was declared dead during World War II in 1942.

In 1949 Churyumov's family moved from Mykolaiv to Kyiv. After seventh grade, he entered the Kyiv Railway College, graduating with honors in 1955. He received a recommendation for admission to higher education.

He entered the Physics Department of Kyiv State University. During his third year of study, he was disappointed to be assigned to the faculty of optics, instead of theoretical physics. However, he continued to attend lectures on theoretical physics, even though the authorities disapproved, and he was eventually moved to the faculty of astronomy, where there were vacant places.

After his graduation in 1960, he was sent to the polar geophysical station at Tiksi Bay in the Yakut ASSR. There he studied the aurora, earth currents and ionosphere.

In 1962, he returned to Kyiv and went to work at the plant "Arsenal", where he participated in the development of optical components for the Soviet military and space programs.

After finishing postgraduate studies at Kyiv State University (specialty "astrophysics", under supervision of professor Sergej Vsekhsvyatskij), he continued working as Fellow at the Department of Astronomy at university.

As part of his work he observed the comets at the astronomical observatory of Kyiv University in the village Lisniki (in Kyiv Oblast) as well during astronomical expeditions in the highlands of Central Asia, the Caucasus, Siberia, the Primorsky Krai, in Chukotka and Kamchatka.

In 1969 the University equipped an expedition of three people, including Churyumov and Svetlana Gerasimenko, for surveillance of periodic comets in Alma-Ata astrophysical observatory, part of what is now the Fesenkov Astrophysical Institute.

In 1972 he defended his first post-graduate scientific degree with thesis "Studies of comets Ikeya-Seki (1967n), Honda (1968c), Tago-Sato-Kosaka (1969g) and new periodic comet Churyumov-Gerasimenko from photographic observations."

In 1993 he defended his doctoral thesis on "Evolutionary physical processes in comets" at the Institute of Space Research, RAS (Moscow).

Beginning in 1998 Churyumov was a professor at Taras Shevchenko National University of Kyiv.

In January 2004 he was appointed as director of the educational center Kyiv Planetarium.

Churyumov died in the night of 13–14 October 2016 in hospital in Kharkiv.

== Honors ==
Awards

- Order of Merit in 2009

Named after him

- Periodic comet 67P/Churyumov–Gerasimenko
- Non-periodic comet C/1986 N1 Churyumov–Solodovnikov
- Asteroid 2627 Churyumov
- Minor planet 3942 Churivannia was found and named by Nikolai Chernykh after the two Ivan Ivanovich Churyumovs, Klim Churyumov's brother and father
- Minor planet 6646 Churanta was found and named by Eleanor F. Helin after Churyumov's mother.
- In December 2022 a street in Kyiv, Ukraine was named after Churyumov
