= Fesenkov =

Fesenkov may refer to:

- Vasily Fesenkov, an astrophysicist; and things named for him:
  - 2286 Fesenkov, a main-belt asteroid
  - Fesenkov (lunar crater)
  - Fesenkov (Martian crater)
