= Svetlana Gerasimenko =

Soviet and Tajikistani astronomer (1945–2025)

- Светлана Герасименко; Світлана Герасименко
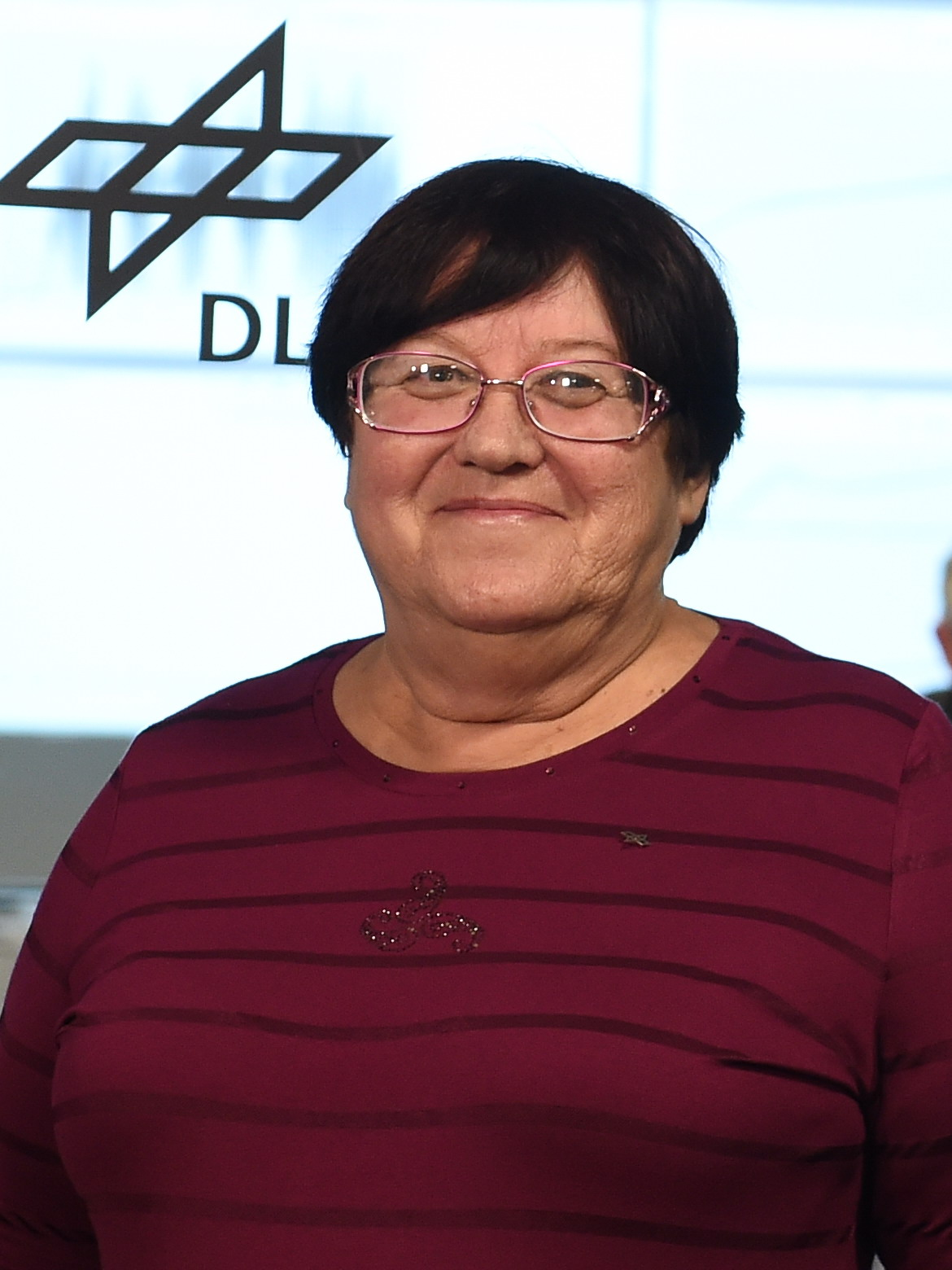
- Gerasimenko in 2014
- Born: Svetlana Ivanovna Gerasimenko; 23 February 1945; Baryshivka, Kyiv Oblast, Ukrainian SSR, USSR
- Died: 8 April 2025 (aged 80)
- Citizenship: Soviet Union, Tajikistan
- Education: Taras Shevchenko National University of Kyiv
- Known for: Comet discovery
- Scientific career
- Fields: Astronomy

Svetlana Ivanovna Gerasimenko (Russian: Светлана Ивановна Герасименко; Ukrainian: Світлана Іванівна Герасименко; 23 February 1945 – 8 April 2025) was a Soviet and Tajikistani astronomer and discoverer of comet 67P/Churyumov–Gerasimenko.

== Early life ==
Gerasimenko was born in the Ukrainian SSR in 1945. She was an ethnic Ukrainian; her father was Ukrainian and her mother Polish.

== Discovery of comet 67P/Churyumov–Gerasimenko ==
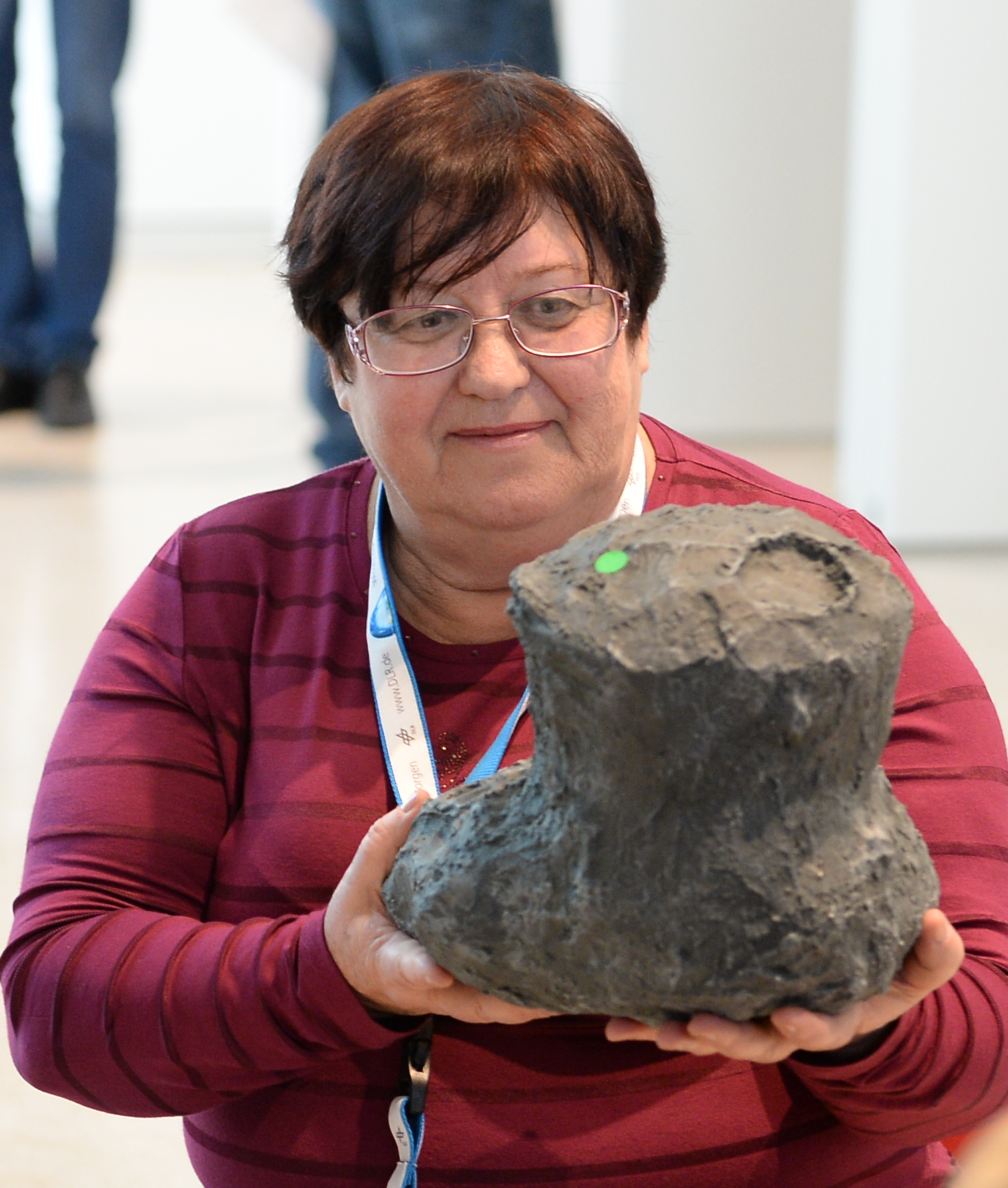
Gerasimenko with a model of the 67P/Churyumov–Gerasimenko

On 11 September 1969 Gerasimenko, while working at the Alma-Ata Astrophysical Institute near Almaty, the then-capital city of the Kazakh Soviet Socialist Republic, Soviet Union photographed the comet 32P/Comas Solà using a 50-cm Maksutov telescope.

After she returned to her home institute, Klim Churyumov of the Kyiv National University's Astronomical Observatory examined this photograph and found a cometary object near the edge of the plate, but assumed that this was Comas Solà. On 22 October, about a month after the photograph was taken, he discovered that the object could not be Comas Solà, because it was 2–3 degrees off the expected position. Further scrutiny produced a faint image of Comas Solà at its expected position on the plate, thus proving that the other object was a different comet. By looking through all the material collected they found this new object on four more plates, dated 9 and 21 September.

== Death ==
Gerasimenko died on 8 April 2025, at the age of 80.

== Honors ==
Named after her

- Periodic comet 67P/Churyumov–Gerasimenko
- Minor planet 3945 Gerasimenko

== See also ==
- Timeline of women in science
