= Kamenskoe Plateau Observatory =

Russian observatory

Observatory Kamenskoe Plateau
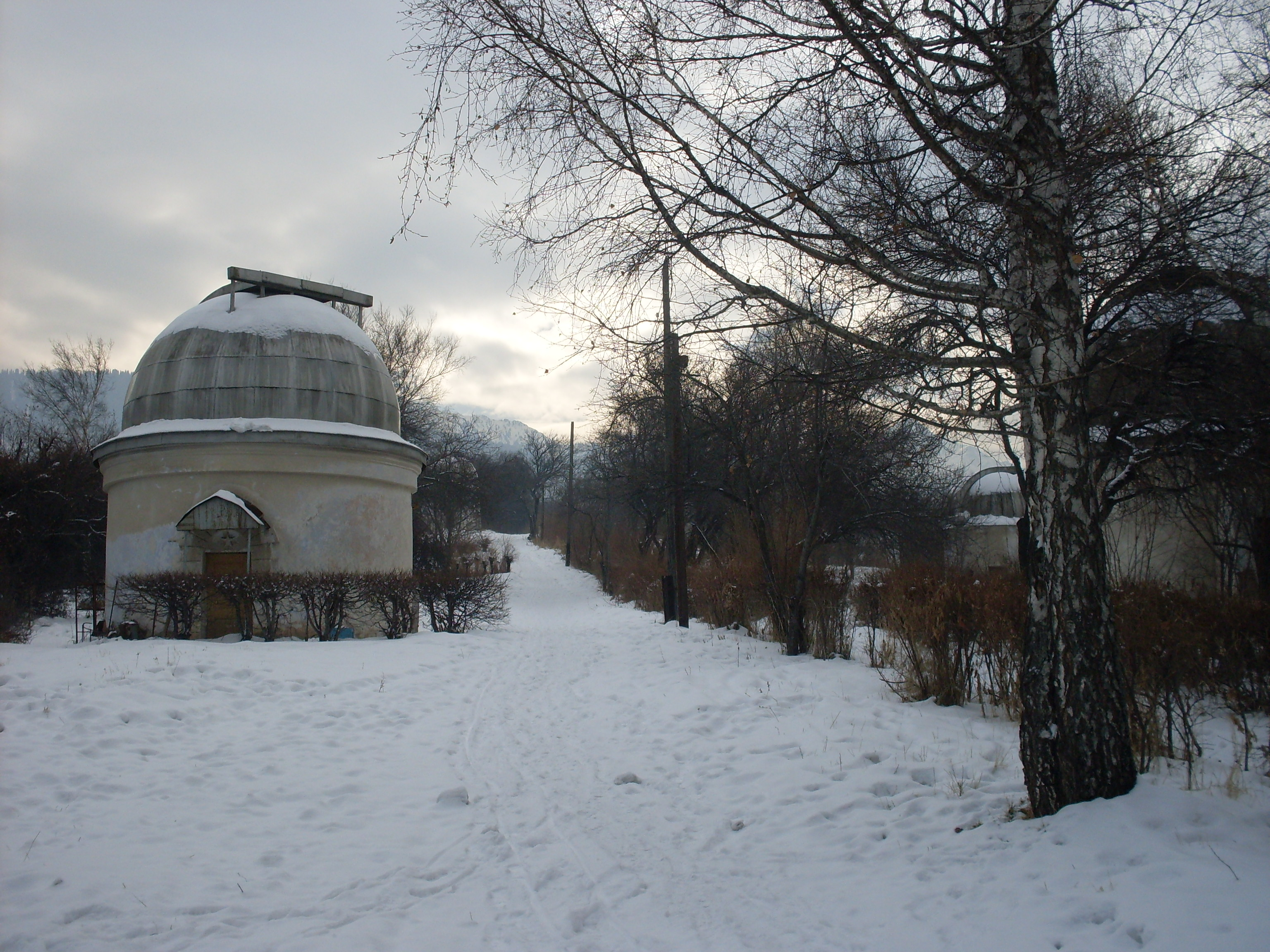
- Observatory code: 210
- Location: Kamenskoe Plateau, Almaty, Kazakhstan
- Coordinates: 43°10′36″N 76°57′58″E
- Altitude: 1450
- Established: 1947
- Location of Observatory Kamenskoe Plateau
- Related media on Commons

Observatory "Kamenskoe Plateau" (Russian: Каменское плато) is an astronomical observatory founded in 1947 at the Fesenkov Astrophysical Institute. In 1948, Gavriil Tikhov headed an independent institution - the astrobotany sector of the Academy of Sciences of the Kazakh SSR - and founded his own observatory. After Tikhov's death in 1960, the astrobotany sector was disbanded. The observatory is located in the grounds of the Fesenkov Institute.

== Observatory leaders ==
- 1941-1964 - Vasily Fesenkov - founder and first director of the Institute of Astronomy and Physics of the Kazakhstan branch of the Academy of Sciences of the USSR (since 1950, the head of the Astrophysical Institute of the Academy of Sciences of the Kazakh SSR).
- 1964-1972 - Grigory Moiseevich Idlis
- 1974-1984 - Tuken Bigalievich Omarov
- 1987 - B. T. Tashenov
- 2005-2010 - Leonid Mikhailovich Chechin
- Currently- Chingis Tukenovich Omarov

== History ==
Observations of the solar eclipse of September 21, 1941, in Kazakhstan were carried out by seven expeditions, which included astronomers, physicists and geophysicists from Moscow and Leningrad. In light of the Axis invasion of the Soviet Union, it was decided to stay in Kazakhstan and join the evacuated scientists in Alma-Ata. So the team of the Research Institute of Astronomy and Physics was formed, created a few weeks later at the suggestion of Vasily Fesenkov. The building of the institute was built after the war by Japanese prisoners. The first searches for a site for the construction of a large observatory with a good astroclimate began in 1943. In the same year, several scientists studying the city found an ideal place for observation near Almaty - the Stone Plateau, which was 1450 meters above sea level. Agrophysicist Vasily Fesenkov and founder Gavriil Tikhov played the roles of the chief project managers. Assistance to scientists and support was provided by Kanysh Satpayev. Today, the Institute of Astrophysics conducts research in 12 areas of astronomy. Temporary expeditions worked on the Kamensk plateau, in Butakovka and in the vicinity of Talgar. In the second half of 1945, the site (11 km (6.8 mi) from Alma-Ata at an altitude of 1,450 metres (4,760 ft) above sea level) and the project of the observatory were chosen, and in March 1946 a government decree on the construction was adopted. The construction itself on the Kamenskoe plateau began in 1947. Until 1950 the observatory was called "Mountain Astrophysical Observatory", and since 1950 the name "Astrophysical Institute" has become official, now bearing the name of its founder - Academician V.G. Fesenkov. Now the observatory has four telescopes, which are used to observe galaxies, stars, planets and geostationary satellites. The observatory is located on the territory of the institute, located on the Kamenskoye plateau, within the city. Periodically in the literature there is the name "Alma-Ata Observatory", and the bus stop is called "Observatory".

== Observatory instruments ==
- 50-cm Hertz reflector (D = 500 mm, F = 11000 mm.) (1948) - for absolute spectrometry (obtained from reparations from Germany after the war): in need of repair, used only for excursions.
- AZT-8 (D = 700 mm, F main = 2800 mm, F Cassegrain = 11000 mm, F Coude = 28000 mm.) (1964) - in operation, satellite observations are being carried out (positional and photometric - A.V. Didenko), AGN and planetary nebulae (spectrophotometry - EK Denisyuk, LN Kondratyeva, RR Valiullin) - was ordered for the Tikhov observatory, but was installed after his death.
- Zeiss-600 (optical system: Cassegrain, D = 600 mm, F = 7200 mm, 1972) - spectrophotometric observations of the planets are carried out (V.G. Teifel).
- Refractor (D = 125 mm, F = mm) - for photographing small planets (1946) - Bredikhinsky astrograph brought from Pulkovo Observatory.
- 20-cm Maksutov meniscus telescope (1950) - convenient for expeditionary work and used for photographic and spectral observations of the Moon and planets, and in 1959-1961 and later, in the 1970s - for astroclimatic observations in search of a place for the construction of a new observatory.

== Research directions ==
- Atmospheric optics.
- Interstellar medium.
- Light and dark nebulae.
- Solar Activity.
- Spectrophotometry of active galaxies.
- Stellar astronomy.
- Large planets of the solar system.
- Comets.
- AES astrometry.
- Comprehensive AGN studies (experimental and theoretical).
- Research in the physics of the early universe.
- The problem of space debris and comet-meteor-asteroid hazard.

== The main topics of scientific work ==
- Creation and maintenance of a catalog of artificial space objects.
- Study of the physics of emerging space objects.
- Studies of the optical properties and structure of the atmospheres of the planets of the Solar System, non-stationary processes on the giant planets Jupiter and Saturn.
- Studies of the Moon and phenomena in the satellite systems of Jupiter and Saturn.
- Studies of geomagnetic manifestations of solar activity.
- Development of astrophysical research for high-precision determination of the orbits of space objects.
- Development of modern numerical methods in gas mechanics and plasma physics and their application in astrophysical research and astrodynamics.
- Development of qualitative, analytical and numerical methods for studying non-stationary problems of the dynamics of artificial and natural celestial bodies.
- Development of astrometric calculation methods for space flight dynamics problems.

== Major achievements ==
- Discovery of comet 67P/Churyumov–Gerasimenko on September 20, 1969.
- "Atlas of gas and dust nebulae" (1953).
- Glass from 5000 images taken with ASI-2.
- 415 astrometric measurements of the main belt asteroids (active observations were carried out in the 1950-1960s).
- In the 1960s, a photometric catalog of reflection nebulae.
- About 50 Seyfert galaxies have been discovered.
- For the first time, it was possible to observe the coverage of a star by an asteroid on the territory of the USSR at the Alma-Ata Observatory on August 17, 1979.

== Observatory address ==
050020, Alma-Ata, Kazakhstan, Observatory, 23.
