= Gavriil Adrianovich Tikhov =

Soviet astronomer

- Гавриил Адрианович Тихов
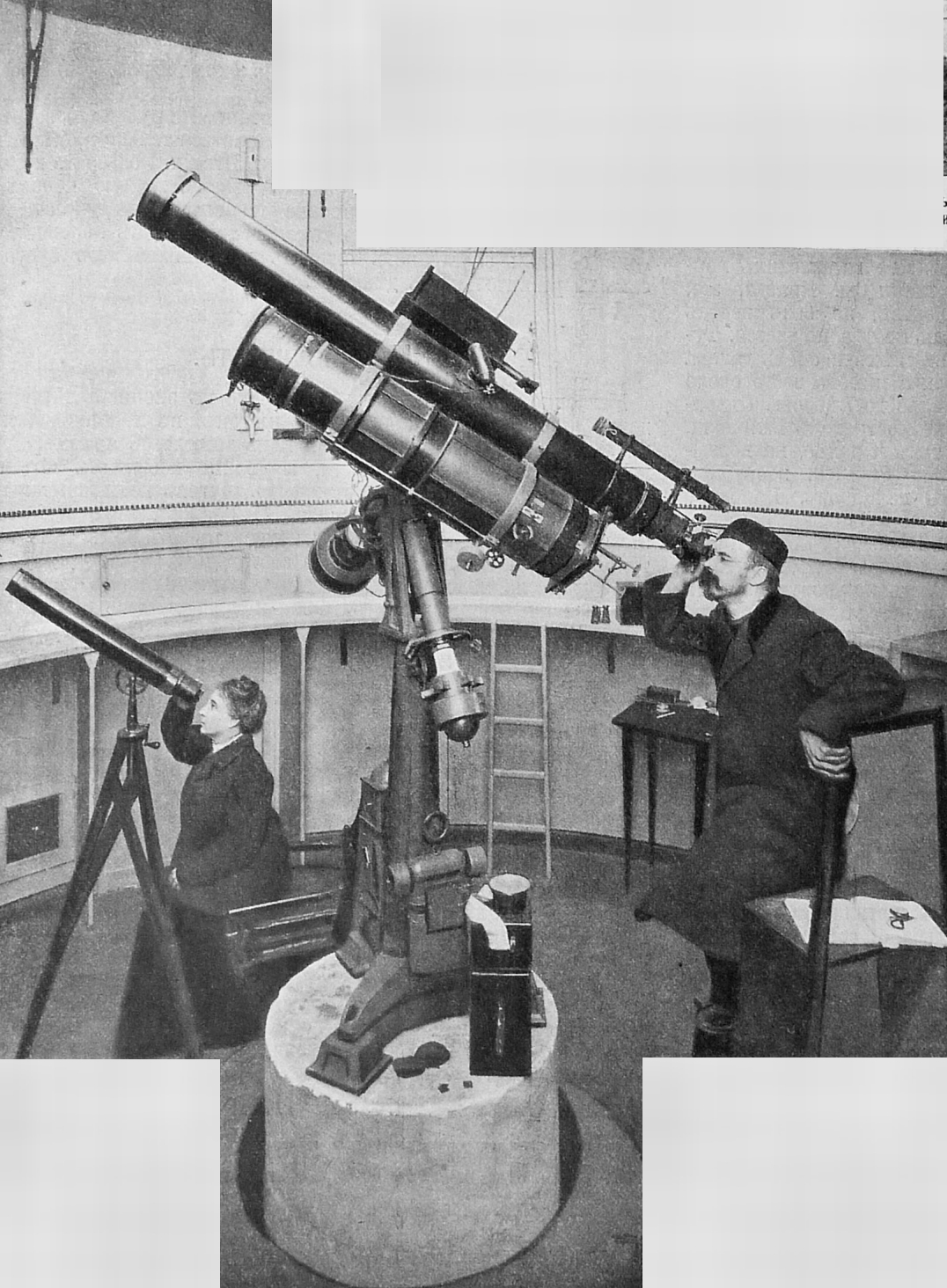
- Gavriil Tikhov with his wife at Pulkovo Observatory in 1912
- Born: May 1, 1875; Smolevichi, Minsk Governorate, Russian Empire
- Died: January 25, 1960 (aged 84); Almaty, Kazakh SSR, Soviet Union
- Occupation: Astronomer

Gavriil Adrianovich Tikhov (Russian: Гавриил Адрианович Тихов, 1 May 1875 – 25 January 1960) was a Soviet astronomer who was a pioneer in astrobiology and is considered to be the father of astrobotany. He worked as an observer at the Pulkovo Observatory from 1906 until 1941. After undertaking an expedition to Almaty to observe the solar eclipse of September 21, 1941, he remained and became one of the founders of the Kamenskoe Plateau Observatory, the Fesenkov Astrophysical Institute, and the Kazakhstan Academy of Sciences.

G. A. Tikhov was born in Smolevichy, near Minsk, in the family of a railway employee, the family often moved from place to place. He began to study at the gymnasium of Pavlodar, and completed secondary education at the Simferopol gymnasium. Living in Simferopol, he once saw two bright stars in the clear evening sky. He learned from the teacher of the Simferopol gymnasium that these stars are the planet Venus and the star Sirius. At the Simferopol Public Library, he read two astronomical books. "I read these books with exciting interest, and my fate was decided. In the spring of 1892 I will never forget - then I irrevocably decided to become an astronomer," he writes in his memoir, 60 Years Near the Telescope. At the gymnasium observatory, he first looked through a telescope.

Tikhov invented the feathering spectrograph by using the commonly occurring chromatic aberration to his advantage. By installing a ring-shaped diaphragm in front of the objective he enabled an observer to deduce the color and spectral class of a star very easily. He was one of the first to use color filters to increase the contrast of surface details on planets. He was appointed head of astrobotany in Alma-Ata, and investigated the possibility of life on other bodies in the Solar System.

The crater Tikhov crater on the Moon, the Martian crater Tikhov, and the asteroid 2251 Tikhov are named in his honor.

== In popular culture ==
- In the episode 5, season 3 of Star Trek: Discovery 'Die Trying', a botanical repository starship is named Tikhov.
