= Kyiv Planetarium =

Ukrainian planetarium opened 1952

Coordinates: 50°25′53″N 30°31′00″E

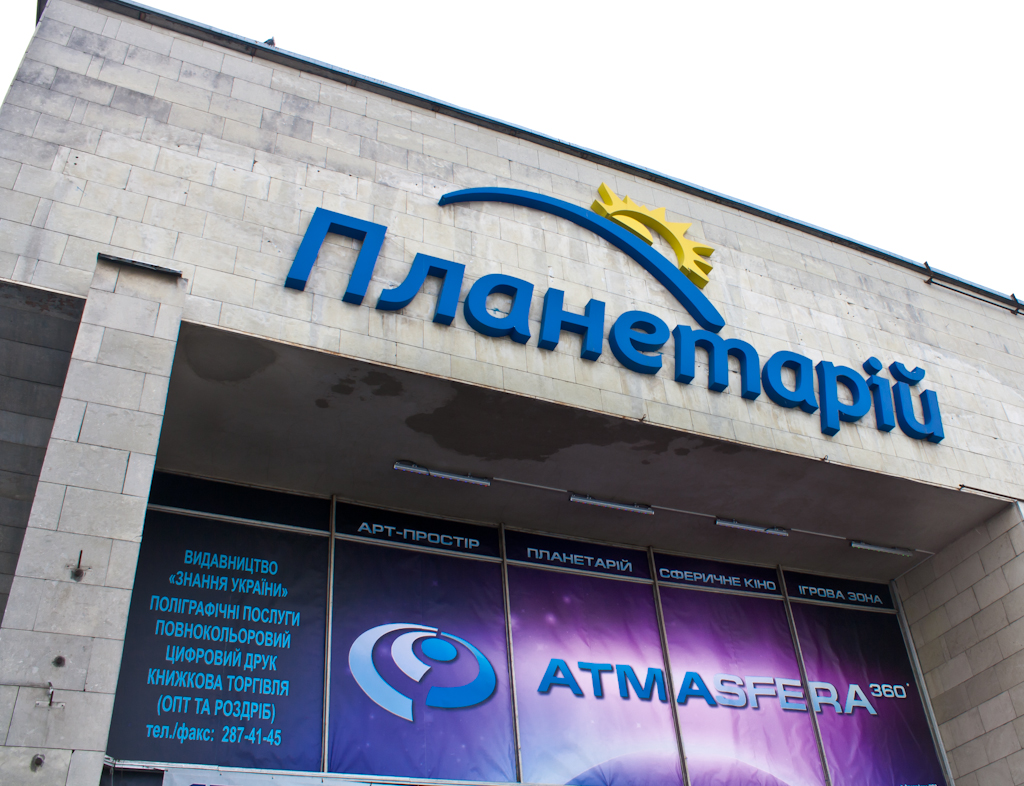
Kyiv Planetarium in January 2012

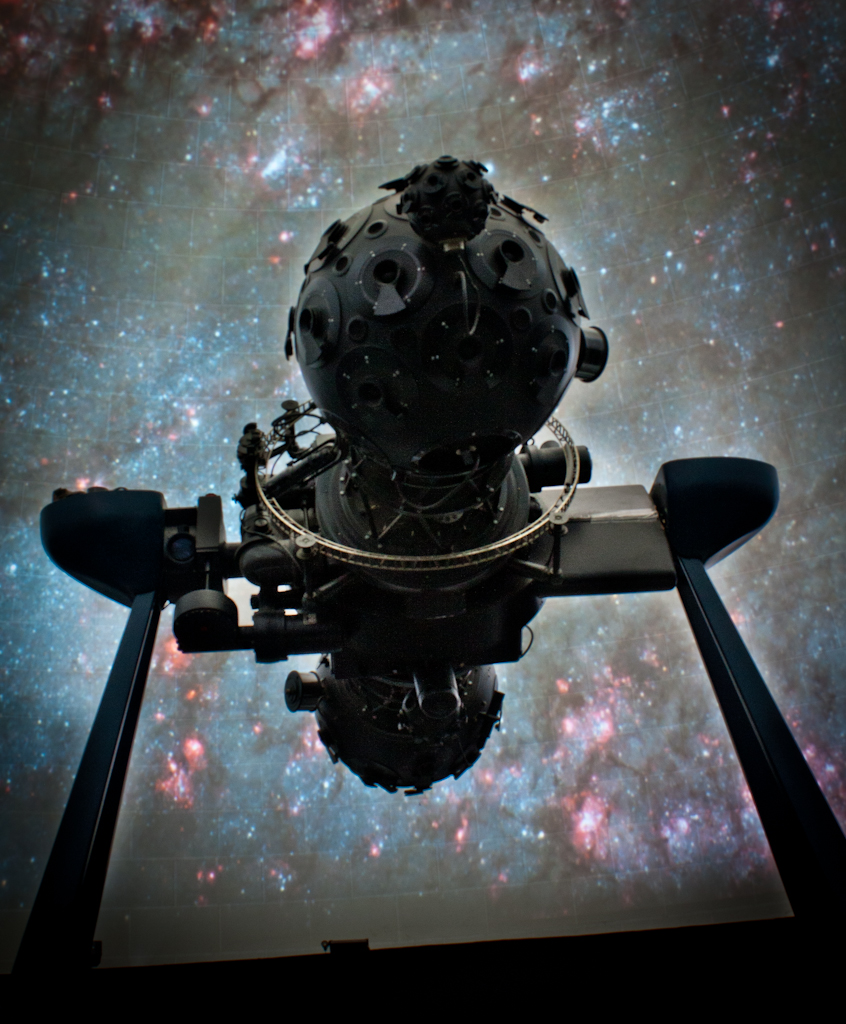
Planetarium projector of the Kyiv Planetarium

Kyiv Planetarium (previously Republican Planetarium; Ukrainian: Київський планетарій) in Kyiv, Ukraine is one of the largest planetaria in former Soviet states. Opened on January 1, 1952, by the initiative of the scientist-astronomer Serhiy Vsekhsviatskiy (1905–1984), the planetarium has a dome of 23.5 meters in diameter, and seats 320 people.

In 1987, Kyiv Planetarium moved to new premises on the street. Red Army, 57 /3, (now Velyka Vasylkivska Street 57/3) where it remains to this day. The new building was equipped with an optomechanical projector "Large Zeiss IV», allowing to demonstrate the 6500 stars of the Northern and Southern hemispheres. The planetarium offers lectures on astronomy, geography, natural history. When the children's planetarium astronomical school for students 6–11 years of age and art studio. Kyiv Planetarium is a division of the Society "Knowledge" of Ukraine.

== Atmasfera 360 ==
In December 2011 an entertainment center ATMASFERA 360 was founded on the basis of the planetarium. Specifications of the dome: diameter — 23 meters, the height of the dome — 11.5 meters. It is equipped with a modern 4k digital projection system supplied by a Ukrainian company Front Pictures. The system uses 15 projectors which work on a single Screenberry media server. Due to digital autocalibration system, the calibration process takes up to 15 minutes and includes all 5 stages:

- Geometric alignment
- Edge blending
- Brightness uniformity
- Gamma matching
- Black level compensation

Atmasfera 360 is equipped with a software, Event Horizon. Event Horizon is a real-time 3D fulldome environment that visualizes and simulates the known Universe according to accurate, up-to-date scientific data. The software is based on the latest Unreal Engine technology and provides up to 4K resolution graphics which, combined with a beautiful soundtrack, gives a notable viewing experience.

== Kyiv Planetarium ==
The planetarium underwent a rebranding and technological upgrade in 2016. It received the name "Kyiv Planetarium". The fulldome auditorium was reequipped with a Front Pictures DX12 software and hardware complex. The 4K digital projection system was synchronized with Zeiss IV Planetarium. Apart from screening fulldome shows, the software installed in the planetarium also allows interactive lectures to be held with SpaceTime360™, presentations with Presenter360™, and the entertaining of visitors with music visualizer Meduza360™.
