= Fesenkov (lunar crater) =

Crater on the Moon

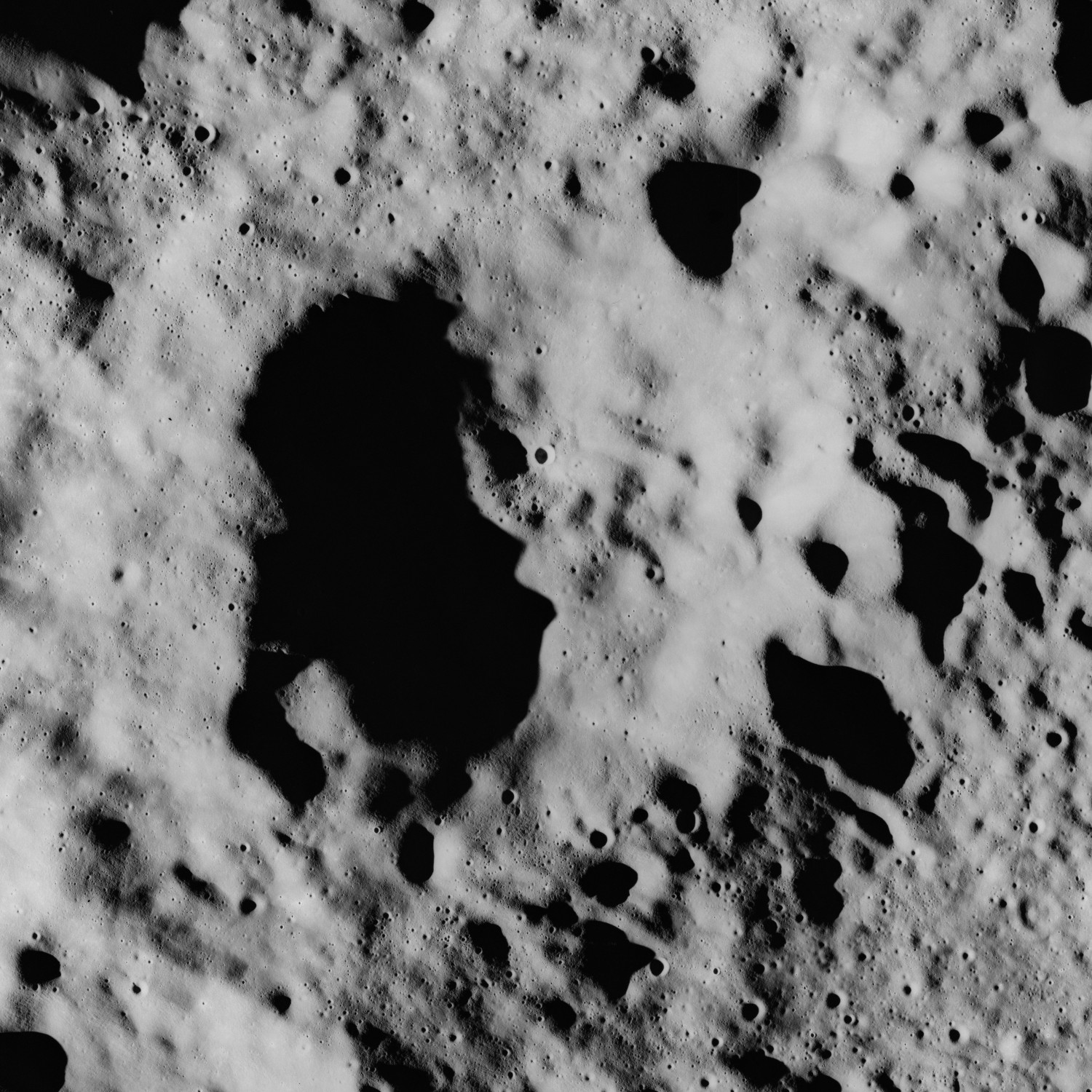
- Apollo 15 mapping camera image
- Coordinates: 23.2°S 135.1°E
- Diameter: 36.12 km (22.44 mi)
- Depth: Unknown
- Colongitude: 225° at sunrise
- Eponym: Vasiliy G. Fesenkov

Fesenkov is a lunar impact crater on the far side of the Moon. It is located to the east-southeast of the prominent crater Tsiolkovskiy, and less than a crater diameter to the north of Stark.

This is an eroded feature with an outer rim that has been irregular and somewhat rugged due to a history of lesser bombardments in the vicinity. The interior floor is somewhat uneven, particularly in the eastern half, and there is a central rise at the midpoint. From the outer northeastern rim is a chain of tiny secondary impacts leading to the east, radial to the Tsiolkovsky impact.

This formation is named after Russian astrophysicist Vasiliy G. Fesenkov (1889-1972). Its designation was officially adopted by the International Astronomical Union in 1973.

== Satellite craters ==
By convention these features are identified on lunar maps by placing the letter on the side of the crater midpoint that is closest to Fesenkov.

Fesenkov	Latitude	Longitude	Diameter
F	23.3° S	137.3° E	16 km
S	23.5° S	133.8° E	17 km
