= 67P/Churyumov–Gerasimenko =

Periodic contact binary comet

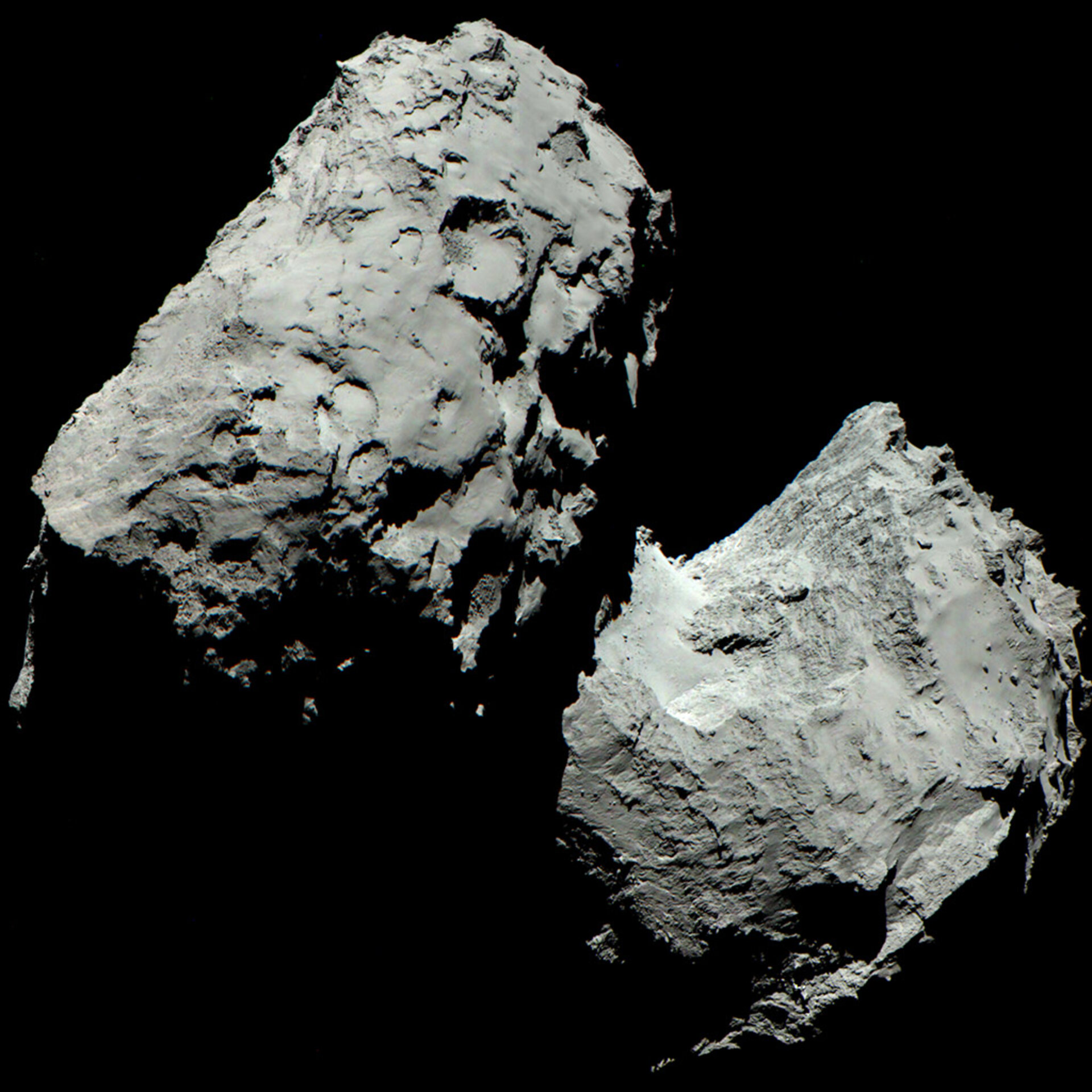
- Comet 67P/Churyumov–Gerasimenko in true colour, as seen by ESA's Rosetta spacecraft in December 2014

Discovery
- Discovered by: Klim Ivanovich Churyumov; Svetlana Ivanovna Gerasimenko
- Discovery site: Almaty, Kazakh SSR, Soviet Union; Kyiv, Ukrainian SSR, Soviet Union
- Discovery date: 20 September 1969

Designations
- Pronunciation: /ˌtʃʌriˈuːmɒf dʒɛrˌæsiˈmɛŋkoʊ, ˌɡɛrəsi-/
- Alternative names: 1969 R1, 1969 IV, 1969h, 1975 P1, 1976 VII, 1975i, 1982 VIII, 1982f, 1989 VI, 1988i "Chury" /ˈtʃʌri/

Orbital characteristics
- Epoch 25 February 2023 (517-215-2427)(JD 2460000.5)
- Aphelion: 5.704 AU (853.3 million km; 530.2 million mi)
- Perihelion: 1.210 AU (181.0 million km; 112.5 million mi)
- Semi-major axis: 3.457 AU (517.2 million km; 321.3 million mi)
- Eccentricity: 0.64989
- Orbital period (sidereal): 6.43 yr
- Mean anomaly: 73.57°
- Inclination: 3.8719°
- Longitude of ascending node: 36.33°
- Time of perihelion: 9 April 2028; 2 November 2021 (previous)
- Argument of perihelion: 22.15°

Physical characteristics
- Dimensions: Large lobe: 4.1 km × 3.3 km × 1.8 km (2.5 mi × 2.1 mi × 1.1 mi); Small lobe: 2.6 by 2.3 by 1.8 kilometres (1.6 mi × 1.4 mi × 1.1 mi)
- Volume: 18.7 km^{3} (4.5 cu mi)
- Mass: (9.982±0.003)×10^{12} kg
- Mean density: 0.533 ± 0.006 g/cm^{3} (0.01926 ± 0.00022 lb/cu in)
- Escape velocity: est. 1 m/s
- Sidereal rotation period: 12.4043±0.0007 h
- Axial tilt: 52°
- North pole right ascension: 69.3°
- North pole declination: 64.1°
- Albedo: 0.06
Surface temp.	min	mean	max
Kelvin	180		230
Celsius	−93		−43
Fahrenheit	−135		−45

67P/Churyumov–Gerasimenko (abbreviated 67P or 67P/C–G and nicknamed "Chury") is a Jupiter-family comet. It is originally from the Kuiper belt and has an orbital period of 6.45 years as of 2012, a rotation period of approximately 12.4 hours, and a maximum velocity of 135,000 km/h (38 km/s; 84,000 mph). Churyumov–Gerasimenko is approximately 4.3 by 4.1 km (2.7 by 2.5 mi) at its longest and widest dimensions. It was first observed on photographic plates in 1969 by Soviet astronomers Klim Ivanovych Churyumov and Svetlana Ivanovna Gerasimenko, after whom it is named. (Note: Both names are stressed on their penultimate syllable. In Ukrainian, the pronunciations are [tʃʊˈrʲumov ˌʕɛrɐsɪˈmɛŋko], approximately churyúmov hèrasiménko, with the g a bit like an English h or a French or German r.) It most recently came to perihelion (closest approach to the Sun) on 2 November 2021, and will next come to perihelion on 9 April 2028.

Churyumov–Gerasimenko was the destination of the European Space Agency's Rosetta mission, launched on 2 March 2004. Rosetta rendezvoused with Churyumov–Gerasimenko on 6 August 2014 and entered orbit on 10 September 2014. Rosetta's lander, Philae, landed on the comet's surface on 12 November 2014, becoming the first spacecraft to land on a comet nucleus. On 30 September 2016, the Rosetta spacecraft ended its mission by landing on the comet in its Maʽat region.

== Discovery ==
Churyumov–Gerasimenko was discovered in 1969 by Klim Ivanovich Churyumov of Kyiv University's Astronomical Observatory, who examined a photograph that had been exposed for comet Comas Solà by Svetlana Ivanovna Gerasimenko on 11 September 1969 at the Alma-Ata Astrophysical Institute, near Alma-Ata, the then-capital city of Kazakh Soviet Socialist Republic, Soviet Union. Churyumov found a cometary object near the edge of the plate, but assumed that this was comet Comas Solà.

After returning to his home institute in Kyiv, Churyumov examined all the photographic plates more closely. On 22 October, about a month after the photograph was taken, he discovered that the object could not be Comas Solà, because it was about 1.8 degrees off the expected position. Further scrutiny produced a faint image of Comas Solà at its expected position on the plate, thus proving the other object to be a different body.

== Shape ==
3D model of 67P by ESA (click to rotate)

The comet consists of two lobes connected by a narrower neck, with the larger lobe measuring about 4.1 km × 3.3 km × 1.8 km (2.5 mi × 2.1 mi × 1.1 mi) and the smaller one about 2.6 km × 2.3 km × 1.8 km (1.6 mi × 1.4 mi × 1.1 mi). With each orbit the comet loses matter, as gas and dust are evaporated away by the Sun. It is estimated that a layer with an average thickness of about 1 ± 0.5 m (3.3 ± 1.6 ft) is lost per orbit as of 2015. The comet has a mass of approximately 10 billion tonnes.

The two-lobe shape of the comet is the result of a gentle, low-velocity collision of two objects, and is called a contact binary. The "terraces", layers of the interior of the comet that have been exposed by partial stripping of outer layers during its existence, are oriented in different directions in the two lobes, indicating that two objects fused to form Churyumov–Gerasimenko.

A high-resolution photogrammetric shape model of the nucleus, featuring 132.1 million facets, was reconstructed using 7,682 NAC and 1,504 WAC images from the OSIRIS cameras taken post-perihelion. This model enabled the first detailed description and thermal modeling of Subsurface Access Points (SAPs)—cavities ranging from 20 to 47 meters in depth that provide direct access to the comet's subsurface. The study established a correlation between the energy threshold received at the bottom of these SAPs and the onset of transient sublimation jets. These sites are considered primary targets for future sample-return missions seeking pristine material beneath the surface crust.

== Surface ==
Dust and cosmic rays on the surface of the comet in 2016, with stars moving in the background. Filmed by Rosetta's OSIRIS instrument

Pristine view (B) of 67P after removal of noise and outliers from the surface using advanced outlier removal techniques. (C) shows the flakes when treated as outliers in the original raw image (A).

There are 26 distinct regions on Churyumov–Gerasimenko, with each named after an Egyptian deity; regions on the large lobe are named after gods, whereas those on the small lobe are named after goddesses. Nineteen regions were defined in the northern hemisphere prior to equinox. Later, when the southern hemisphere became illuminated, seven more regions were identified using the same naming convention.

Region	Terrain	Region	Terrain	Region	Terrain
Maʽat	Dust covered	Ash	Dust covered	Babi	Dust covered
Seth	Pitted and brittle material	Hatmehit	Large-scale depression	Nut	Large-scale depression
Aten	Large-scale depression	Hapi	Smooth	Imhotep	Smooth
Anubis	Smooth	Maftet	Rock-like	Bastet	Rock-like
Serqet	Rock-like	Hathor	Rock-like	Anuket	Rock-like
Khepry	Rock-like	Aker	Rock-like	Atum	Rock-like
Apis	Rock-like	Khonsu	Rock-like	Bes	Rock-like
Anhur	Rock-like, rather friable	Geb	Rock-like	Sobek	Rock-like
Neith	Rock-like	Wosret	Rock-like		

=== Gates ===
Features described as gates, twin prominences on the surface so named for their appearance, were named after deceased members of the Rosetta team.

Name	Named after
C. Alexander Gate	Claudia Alexander
A. Coradini Gate	Angioletta Coradini

=== Surface changes ===
During Rosetta's lifetime, many changes were observed on the comet's surface, particularly when the comet was close to perihelion. These changes included evolving patterns of circular shapes in smooth terrains that at some point grew in size by a few meters per day. A fracture in the neck region was also observed to grow in size; boulders tens of meters wide were displaced, sometimes travelling more than 100 meters; and patches of the ground were removed to expose new features. A number of collapsing cliffs have also been observed. One notable example in December 2015 was captured by Rosetta's NAVCAM as a bright patch of light shining from the comet. Rosetta scientists determined that a large cliff had collapsed, making it the first landslide on a comet known to be associated with an outburst of activity. An apparent outburst of the comet was observed on 14 November 2021. According to the researchers, "At the time of the outburst discovery with ZTF, the comet was 1.23 au from the Sun and 0.42 au from the Earth. The comet's last perihelion passage was on 2021 Nov 2.".

=== Cheops boulder ===
Cheops is the largest boulder on the surface of the comet, measuring up to 45 meters. It is located in the comet's larger lobe. It was named for the pyramid in Giza because its shape is similar to that of a pyramid.

== Orbit and rotation ==
Perihelion distance at different epochs
Epoch	Perihelion (AU)
1821	2.44
1882	2.94
1956	2.74
1963	1.28
2021	1.21
2101	1.35
2223	≈ 0.8

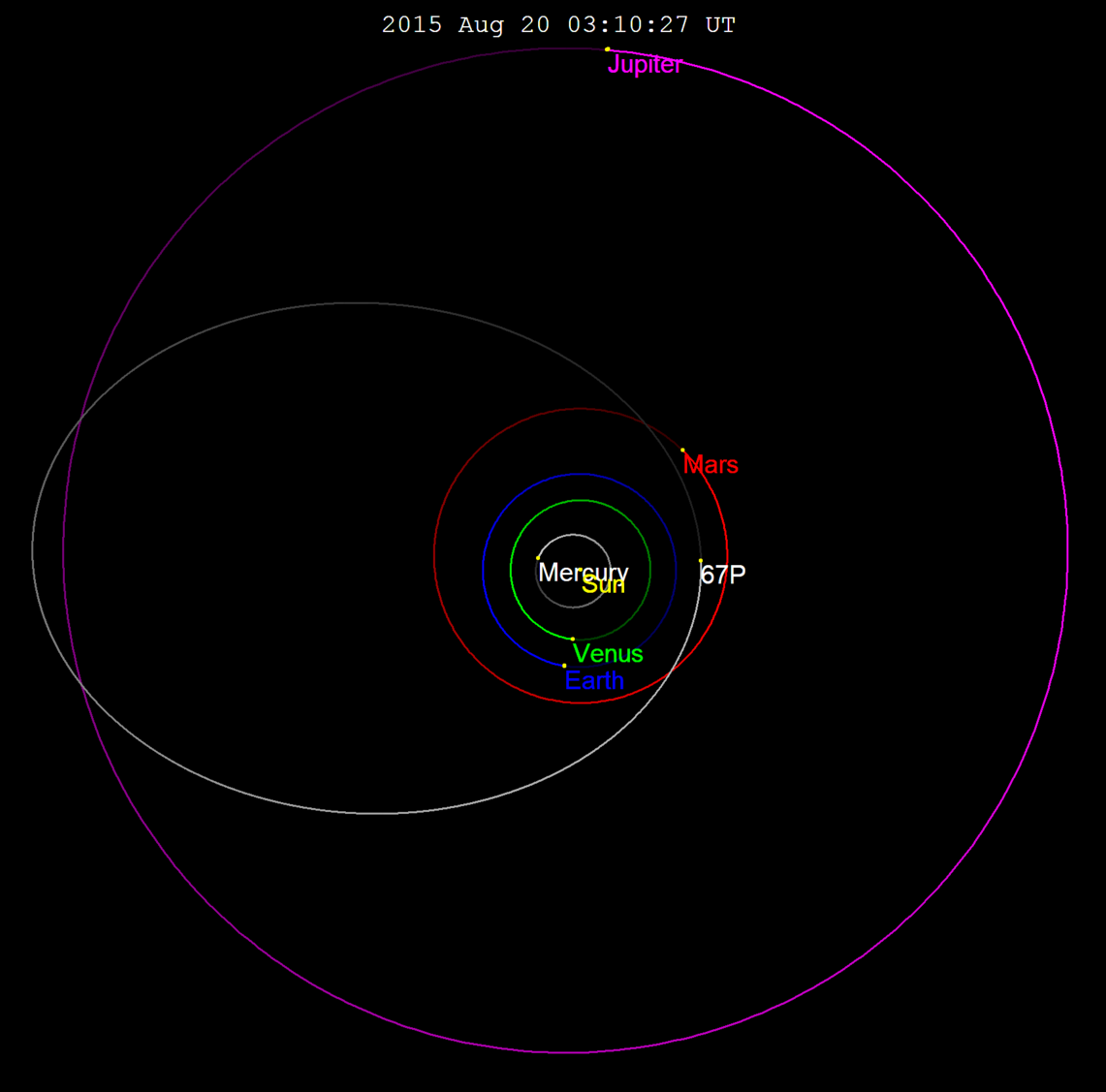
The orbit of 67P/Churyumov–Gerasimenko moves from just inside the orbit of Mars to just outside the orbit of Jupiter, seen here at perihelion in August 2015.

This animation consists of 86 images acquired by Rosetta's NavCam as it approached 67P in August 2014.

Like the other comets of the Jupiter family, Churyumov–Gerasimenko probably originated in the Kuiper belt and was ejected towards the interior of the Solar System, where later encounters with Jupiter successively changed its orbit. These interactions will continue until the comet is eventually thrown out of the Solar System or collides with the Sun or a planet.

On 4 February 1959, a close encounter with Jupiter of 0.0515 AU (7.70 million km) moved Churyumov–Gerasimenko's perihelion inward from 2.7 AU (400 million km) to 1.28 AU (191 million km), where it basically remains today. In November 2220 the comet will pass about 0.14 AU (21 million km) from Jupiter which will move perihelion inwards to about 0.8 AU (120 million km) from the Sun.

Before Churyumov–Gerasimenko's perihelion passage in 2009, its rotational period was 12.76 hours. During this perihelion passage, it decreased to 12.4 hours, which likely happened because of sublimation-induced torque.

=== 2015 perihelion ===
As of September 2014, Churyumov–Gerasimenko's nucleus had an apparent magnitude of roughly 20. It came to perihelion on 13 August 2015. From December 2014 until September 2015, it had an elongation less than 45 degrees from the Sun. On 10 February 2015, it went through solar conjunction when it was 5 degrees from the Sun and was 3.3 AU (490 million km) from Earth. It crossed the celestial equator on 5 May 2015 and became easiest to see from the Northern Hemisphere. Even right after perihelion when it was in the constellation of Gemini, it only brightened to about apparent magnitude 12, and required a telescope to be seen. As of July 2016, the comet had a total magnitude of about 20.

=== 2021 perihelion ===
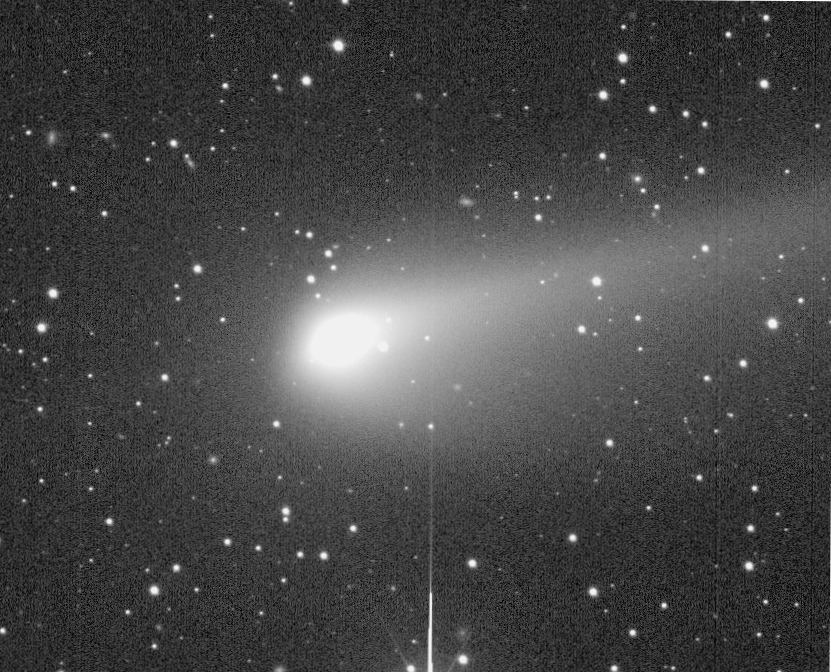
The comet on 11 November 2021 by ZTF

The 2021 apparition marked the closest approach to Earth since 1982. The comet reached perihelion on 2 November 2021 and the closest approach to Earth was on November 12, 2021, at 00:50 UTC, at a distance of 38 million miles (61 million km). The comet brightened to an apparent magnitude of 9, meaning it was visible with amateur telescopes. Two outbursts were observed during the apparition, on 2021 October 29.940 and November 17.864 UTC, −3.12 days and +15.81 days, respectively, from the perihelion date. During the first outburst the comet brightened by 0.26 ± 0.03 mag in the outburst, with a 27% increase in the effective geometric cross-section and total outburst dust mass of 5.3×10^{5} kg. The second outburst caused a brightening of 0.49 ± 0.08 mag with effective geometric cross-section and total outburst dust mass 2.5 times larger than the first event.

== Exploration ==
=== Rosetta mission ===
The Rosetta mission was the first mission to include an orbiter that accompanied a comet for several years, as well as a lander that collected close-up data from the comet's surface. The mission launched in 2004, arrived at comet 67P in 2014, and concluded with a touchdown on the comet's surface in 2016.

==== Advance work ====
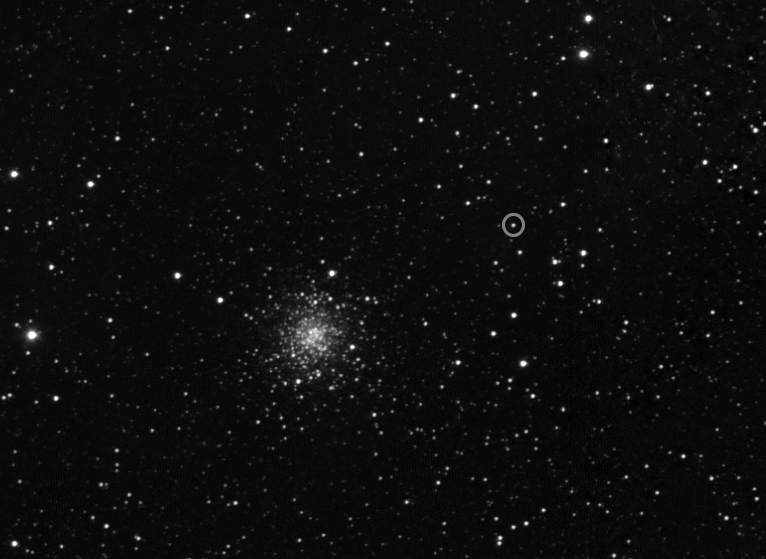
First image of comet (circled) taken by Rosetta on 21 March 2014, with Messier 107 in view

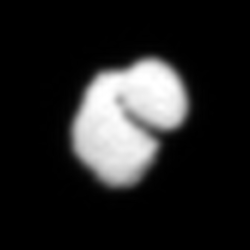
Processed view of comet from 14 July 2014, showing the first indication of its bilobate nature

As preparation for the Rosetta mission, Hubble Space Telescope pictures taken on 12 March 2003 were closely analysed. An overall 3D model was constructed and computer-generated images were created.

On 25 April 2012, the most detailed observations until that time were taken with the 2-meter Faulkes Telescope by N. Howes, G. Sostero and E. Guido while it was at its aphelion.

On 6 June 2014, water vapor was detected being released at a rate of roughly 1 litre per second (0.26 US gallons per second) when Rosetta was 360,000 km (220,000 mi) from Churyumov–Gerasimenko and 3.9 AU (580 million km) from the Sun. On 14 July 2014, images taken by Rosetta showed that its nucleus is irregular in shape with two distinct lobes. The size of the nucleus was estimated to be 3.5 km × 4 km (2.2 mi × 2.5 mi). Two explanations for its shape were proposed at the time: that it was a contact binary, or that its shape may have resulted from asymmetric erosion due to ice sublimating from its surface to leave behind its lobed shape. By September 2015, mission scientists had determined that the contact binary hypothesis was unambiguously correct.

==== Rendezvous and orbit ====
Animation of Rosetta's trajectory from 2 March 2004 to 9 September 2016
Rosetta · 67P · Earth · Mars · 21 Lutetia · 2867 Šteins

Animation of Rosetta's orbit around 67P from 1 August 2014 to 31 March 2015
Rosetta · 67P

Beginning in May 2014, Rosetta's velocity was reduced by 780 m/s (2,800 km/h; 1,700 mph) with a series of thruster firings. Ground controllers rendezvoused Rosetta with Churyumov–Gerasimenko on 6 August 2014. This was done by reducing Rosetta's relative velocity to 1 m/s (4 km/h; 2 mph). Rosetta entered orbit on 10 September, at about 30 km (19 mi) from the nucleus.

==== Landing ====
Descent of a small lander occurred on 12 November 2014. Philae is a 100 kg (220 lb) robotic probe that set down on the surface with landing gear. The landing site has been christened Agilkia in honor of Agilkia Island, where the temples of Philae Island were relocated after the construction of the Aswan Dam flooded the island. The acceleration due to gravity on the surface of Churyumov–Gerasimenko has been estimated for simulation purposes at 10^{−3} m/s^{2}, or about 1/10,000 of that on Earth.

Because of its low relative mass, landing on the comet relied on tools to anchor Philae to the surface. The probe had an array of mechanisms designed to manage Churyumov–Gerasimenko's low gravity, including a cold gas thruster, harpoons, landing-leg-mounted ice screws, and a flywheel to keep it oriented during its descent. During the event, the thruster and the harpoons failed to operate, and the ice screws did not gain a grip. The lander bounced twice and only came to rest when it made contact with the surface for the third time, two hours after first contact.

Contact with Philae was lost on 15 November 2014 because of dropping battery power. The European Space Operations Centre briefly reestablished communications on 14 June 2015 and reported a healthy spacecraft but communications were lost again soon after. On 2 September 2016, Philae was located in photographs taken by the Rosetta orbiter. It had come to rest in a crack with only its body and two legs visible. While the discovery solves the question of the lander's disposition, it also allows project scientists to properly contextualise the data it returned from the comet's surface.

=== Locating Philae ===
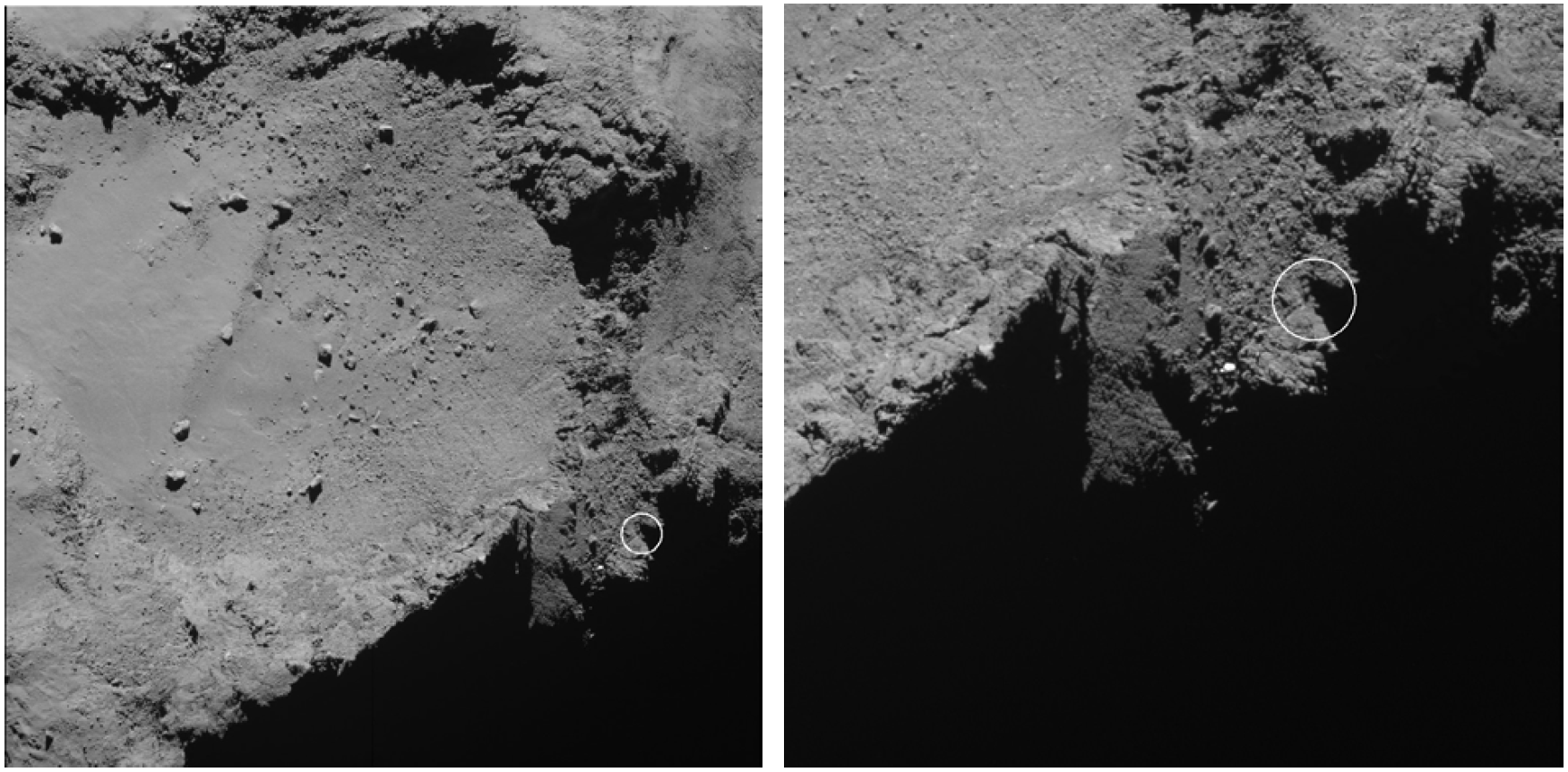
OSIRIS-NAC image showing the Hatmehit basin and the Philae landing zone.

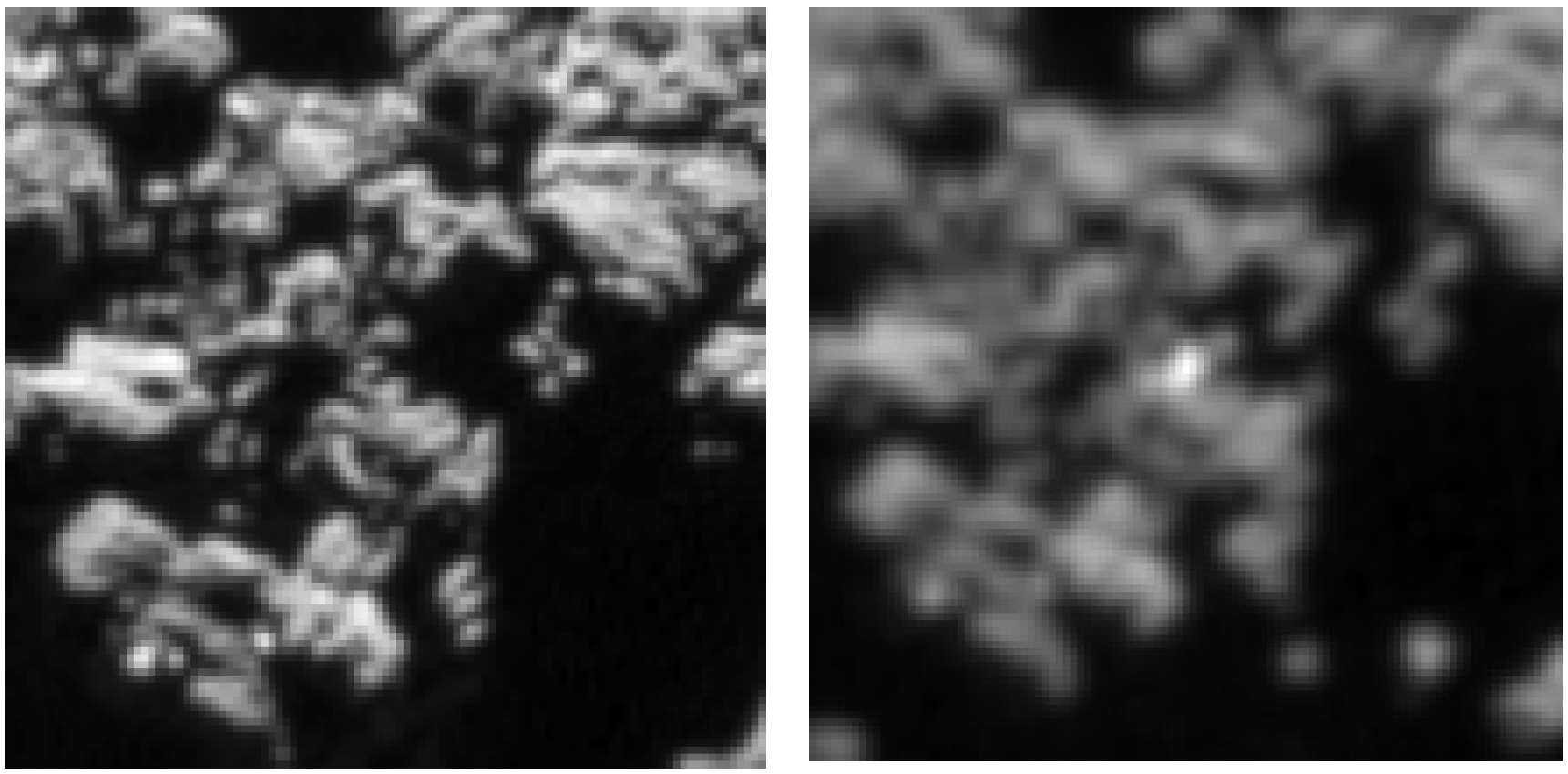
Pre- and post-landing OSIRIS-NAC images. The breakthrough in finding Philae occurred by comparing these images under identical illumination conditions.

Following Philae's bouncing touchdown in November 2014, finding its exact location on the comet proved to be a major challenge. Measurements from the CONSERT instrument made it possible to locate Philae within an ellipse measuring approximately 16 x 160 m. Complementary analyses by CNES-SONC further narrowed down the theoretical location based on illumination conditions and times of contact between the orbiter and lander.

The localization of Philae was the result of a long-term collective effort. By April 2015, the image of the lander was successfully identified among several candidates through an in-depth analysis of OSIRIS-NAC data by Guillaume Faury. The breakthrough was achieved when a pre-landing image from the OSIRIS-NAC collection was found to have geometric conditions (illumination and viewing angles) very similar to a post-landing image taken in mid-December 2014. All topographic details matched perfectly between the two images, except for one bright spot—about two pixels wide—present only on the post-landing image.

Although initially referred to as the "red candidate" in early ESA communications, its position was entirely consistent with the trajectory, solar illumination, and radio visibility models. The candidate was definitively confirmed as the Philae lander in September 2016, when the Rosetta spacecraft flew close enough to capture very high-resolution images of the probe resting in a dark crevice.

==== Physical properties ====
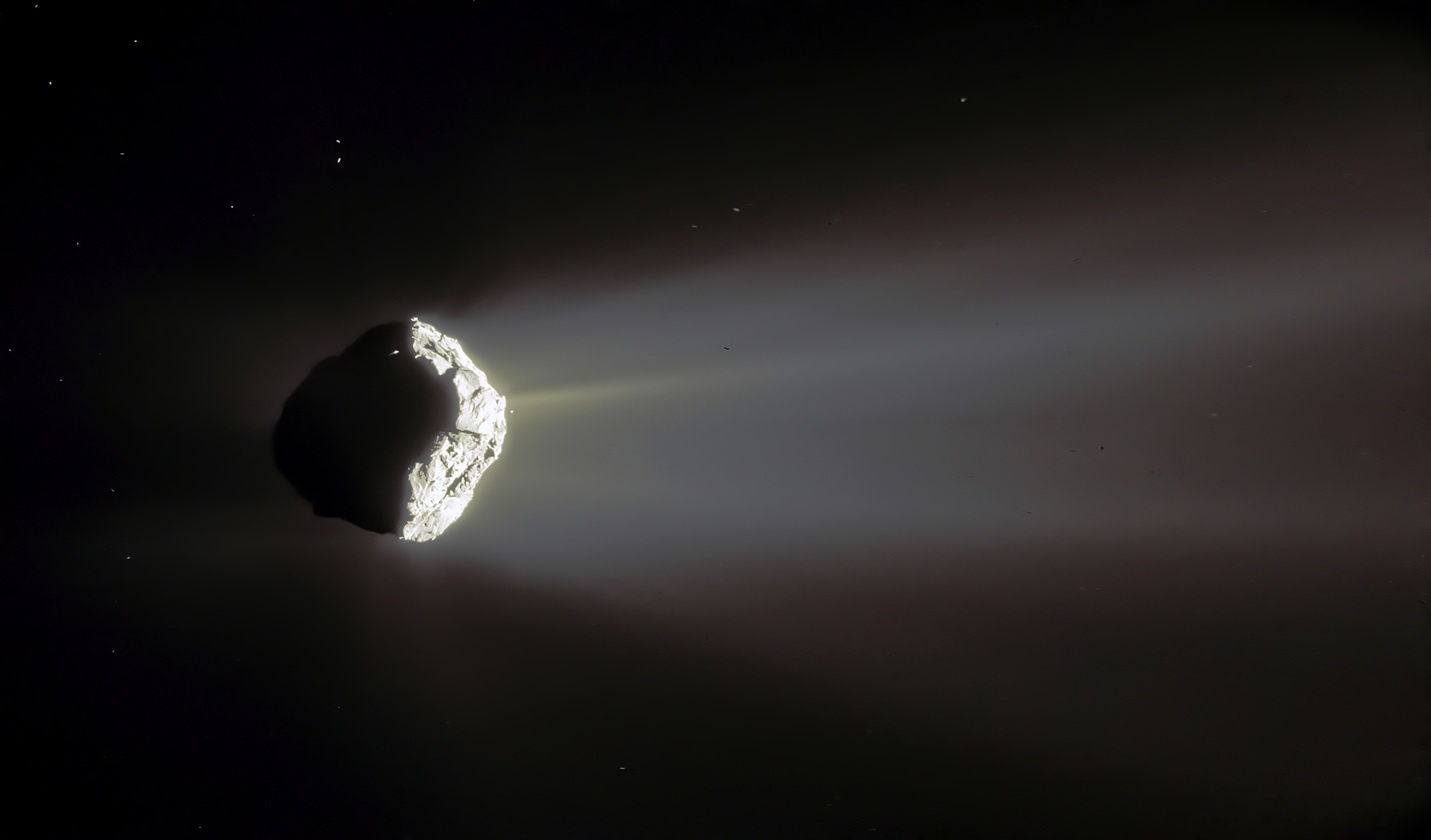
False-colour image of the comet outgassing, 15 April 2015

The composition of water vapor from Churyumov–Gerasimenko, as determined by the Rosetta spacecraft, is substantially different from that found on Earth. The ratio of deuterium to hydrogen in the water from the comet was determined to be three times that found for terrestrial water. This makes it unlikely that water found on Earth came from comets like Churyumov–Gerasimenko. The water vapor is also mixed with significant amount of formaldehyde (0.5 wt%) and methanol (0.4 wt%), these concentrations falling within common range for Solar system comets. On 22 January 2015, NASA reported that, between June and August 2014, the comet released increasing amounts of water vapor, up to tenfold as much. On 23 January 2015, the journal Science published a special issue of scientific studies related to the comet.

Measurements carried out before Philae's batteries failed indicate that the dust layer could be as much as 20 cm (8 in) thick. Beneath that is hard ice, or a mixture of ice and dust. Porosity appears to increase toward the center of the comet.

The nucleus of Churyumov–Gerasimenko was found to have no magnetic field of its own after measurements were taken during Philae's descent and landing by its ROMAP instrument and Rosetta's RPC-MAG instrument. This suggests that magnetism may not have played a role in the early formation of the Solar System, as had previously been hypothesized.

The ALICE spectrograph on Rosetta determined that electrons (within 1 km or 0.6 mi above the comet nucleus) produced from photoionization of water molecules by solar radiation, and not photons from the Sun as thought earlier, are responsible for the degradation of water and carbon dioxide molecules released from the comet nucleus into its coma. Also, active pits, related to sinkhole collapses and possibly associated with outbursts are present on the comet.

Measurements by the COSAC and Ptolemy instruments on the Philae's lander revealed sixteen organic compounds, four of which were seen for the first time on a comet, including acetamide, acetone, methyl isocyanate and propionaldehyde. Astrobiologists Chandra Wickramasinghe and Max Wallis stated that some of the physical features detected on the comet's surface by Rosetta and Philae, such as its organic-rich crust, could be explained by the presence of extraterrestrial microorganisms. Rosetta program scientists dismissed the claim as "pure speculation". Carbon-rich compounds are common in the Solar System. Neither Rosetta nor Philae is equipped to search for direct evidence of organisms. The only amino acid detected thus far on the comet is glycine, along with precursor molecules methylamine and ethylamine.

Solid organic compounds were also found in the dust particles emitted by the comet; the carbon in this organic material is bound in "very large macromolecular compounds", analogous to the insoluble organic matter in carbonaceous chondrite meteorites. Scientists think that the observed cometary carbonaceous solid matter could have the same origin as the meteoritic insoluble organic matter, but suffered less modification before or after being incorporated into the comet.

One of the most outstanding discoveries of the mission was the detection of large amounts of free molecular oxygen (O_{2}) gas surrounding the comet. Solar system models suggest the molecular oxygen should have disappeared by the time 67P was created, about 4.6 billion years ago in a violent and hot process that would have caused the oxygen to react with hydrogen and form water. Molecular oxygen has never before been detected in cometary comas. In situ measurements indicate that the O_{2}/H_{2}O ratio is isotropic in the coma and does not change systematically with heliocentric distance, suggesting that primordial O_{2} was incorporated into the nucleus during the comet's formation. This interpretation was challenged by the discovery that O_{2} may be produced on the surface of the comet in water molecule collisions with silicates and other oxygen-containing materials. Detection of molecular nitrogen (N_{2}) in the comet suggests that its cometary grains formed in low-temperature conditions below 30 K (−243 °C; −406 °F).

On 3 July 2018, researchers hypothesized that molecular oxygen might not be made on the surface of comet 67P in sufficient quantity, thus deepening the mystery of its origin.

=== Future missions ===
CAESAR was a proposed sample-return mission aimed at returning to 67P/Churyumov–Gerasimenko, capturing regolith from the surface, and returning it to Earth. This mission was competing in NASA's New Frontiers mission 4 selection process, and was one of two finalists in the program. In June 2019, it was passed over in favor of Dragonfly.

== Gallery ==
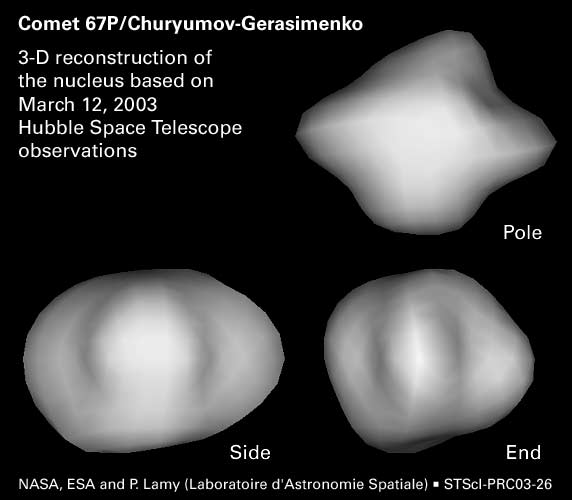
A reconstruction of the nucleus's shape based on Hubble observations in 2003

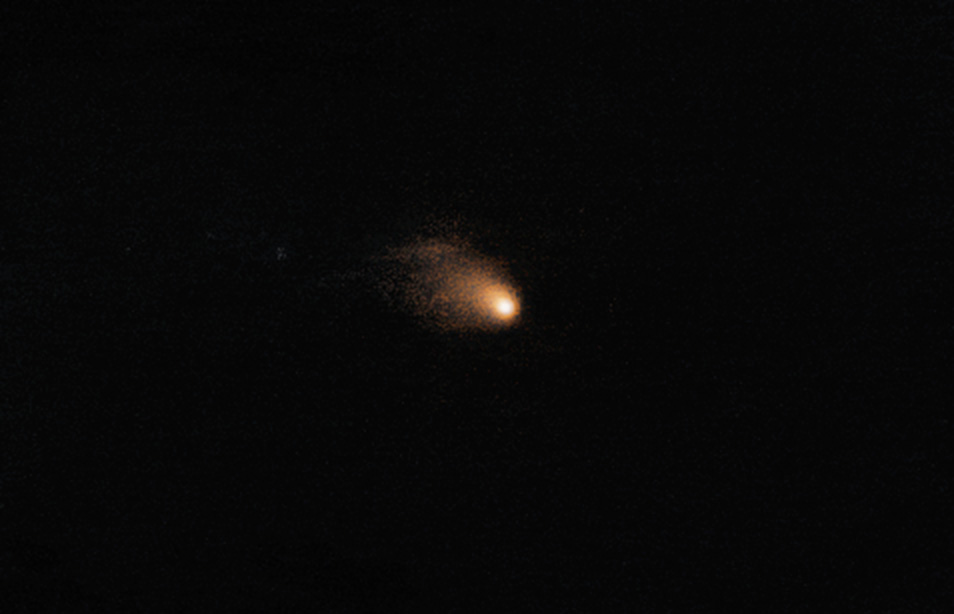
As seen by the Very Large Telescope on 11 August 2014

As seen by Rosetta on 19 August 2014

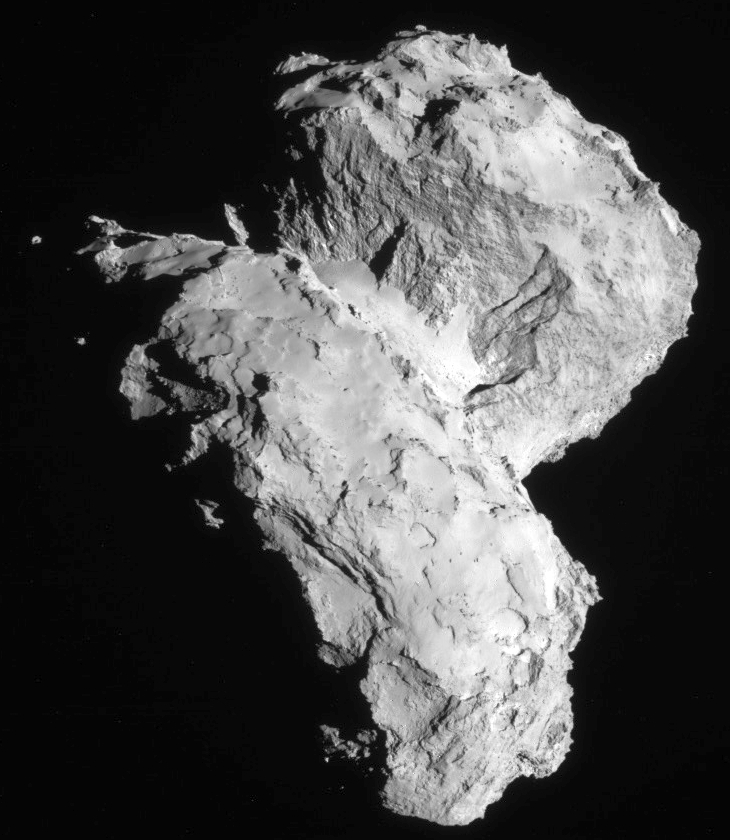
As seen by Rosetta on 22 August 2014

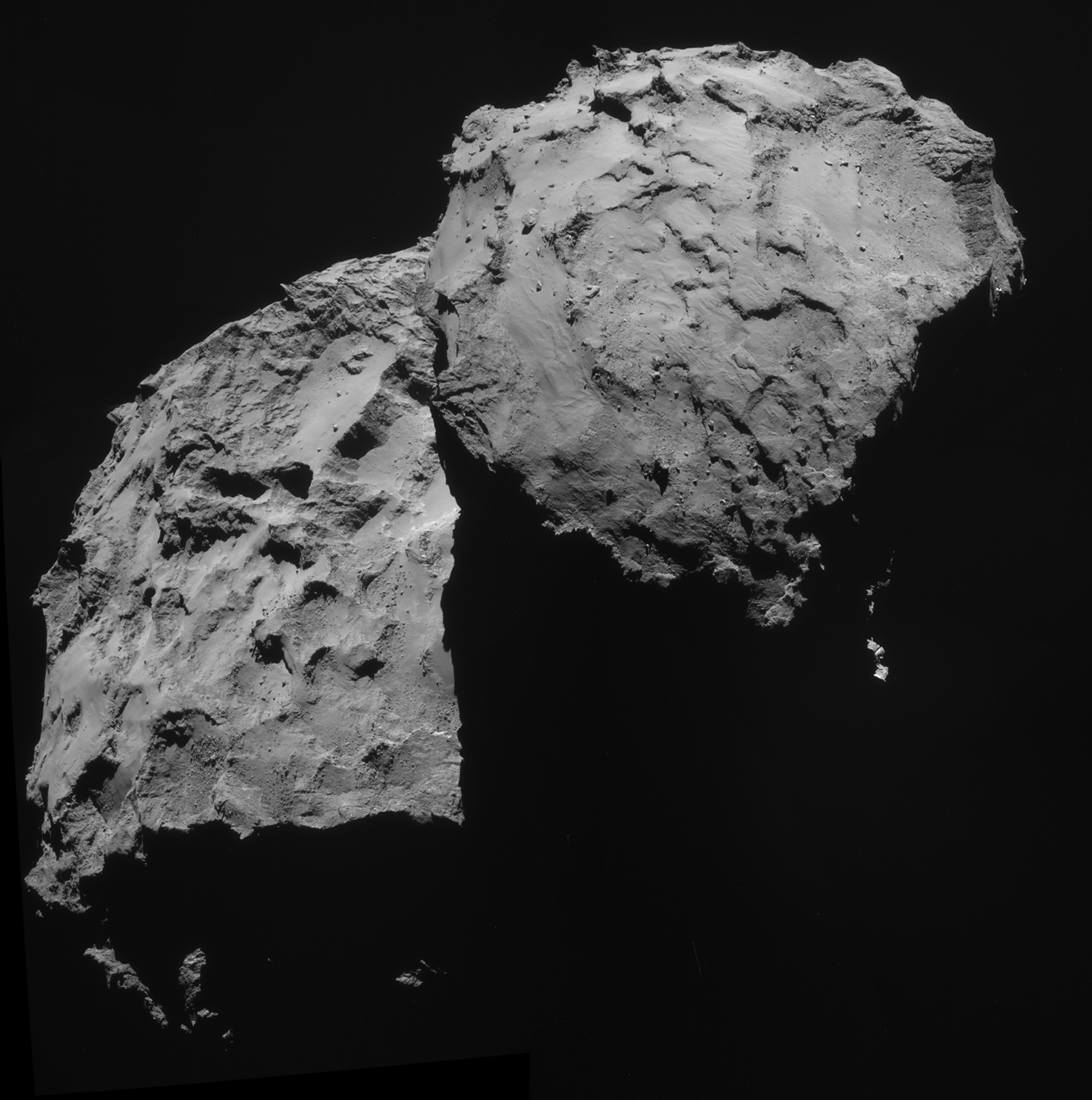
As seen by Rosetta on 14 September 2014

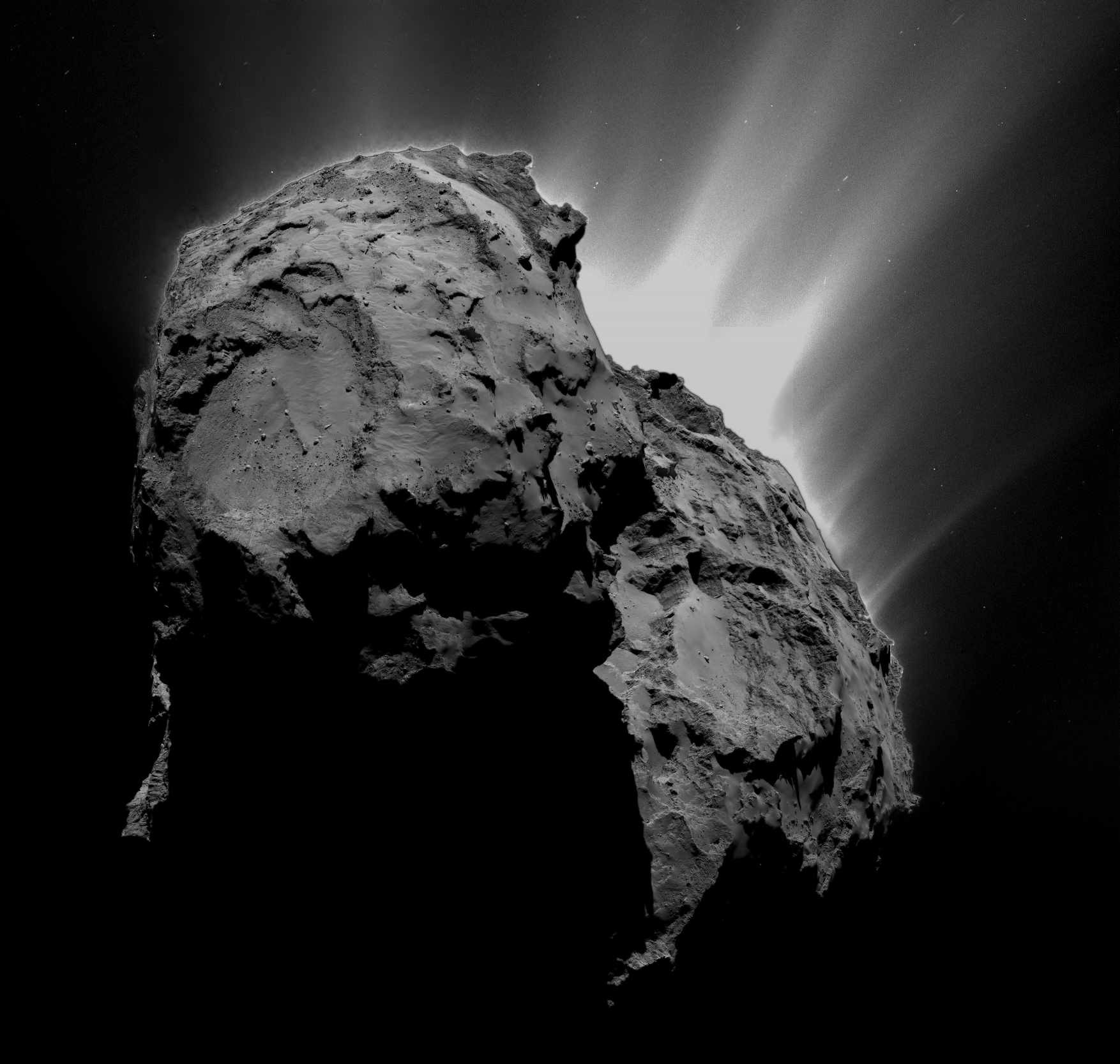
As seen by Rosetta on 28 March 2015

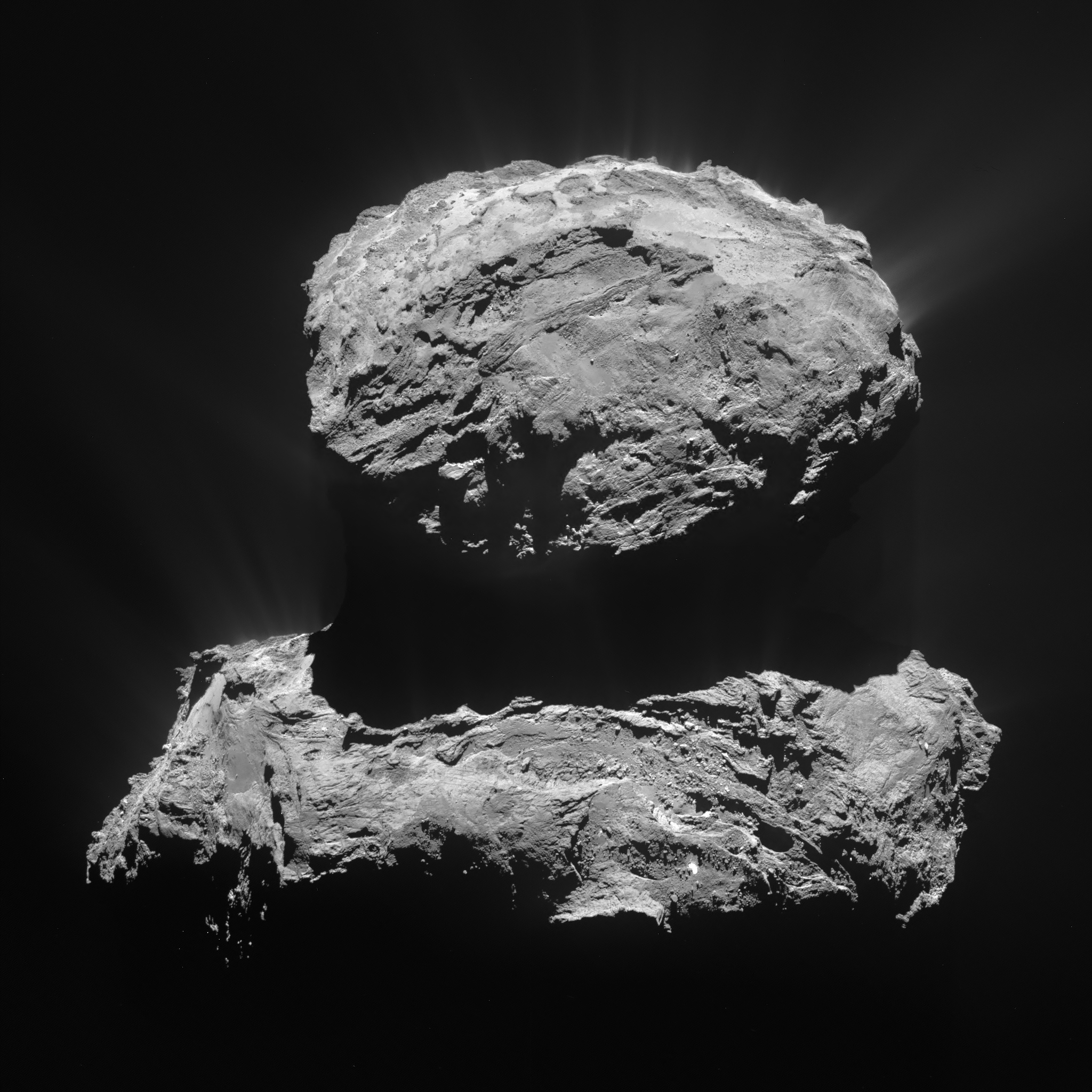
As seen by Rosetta on 2 May 2015

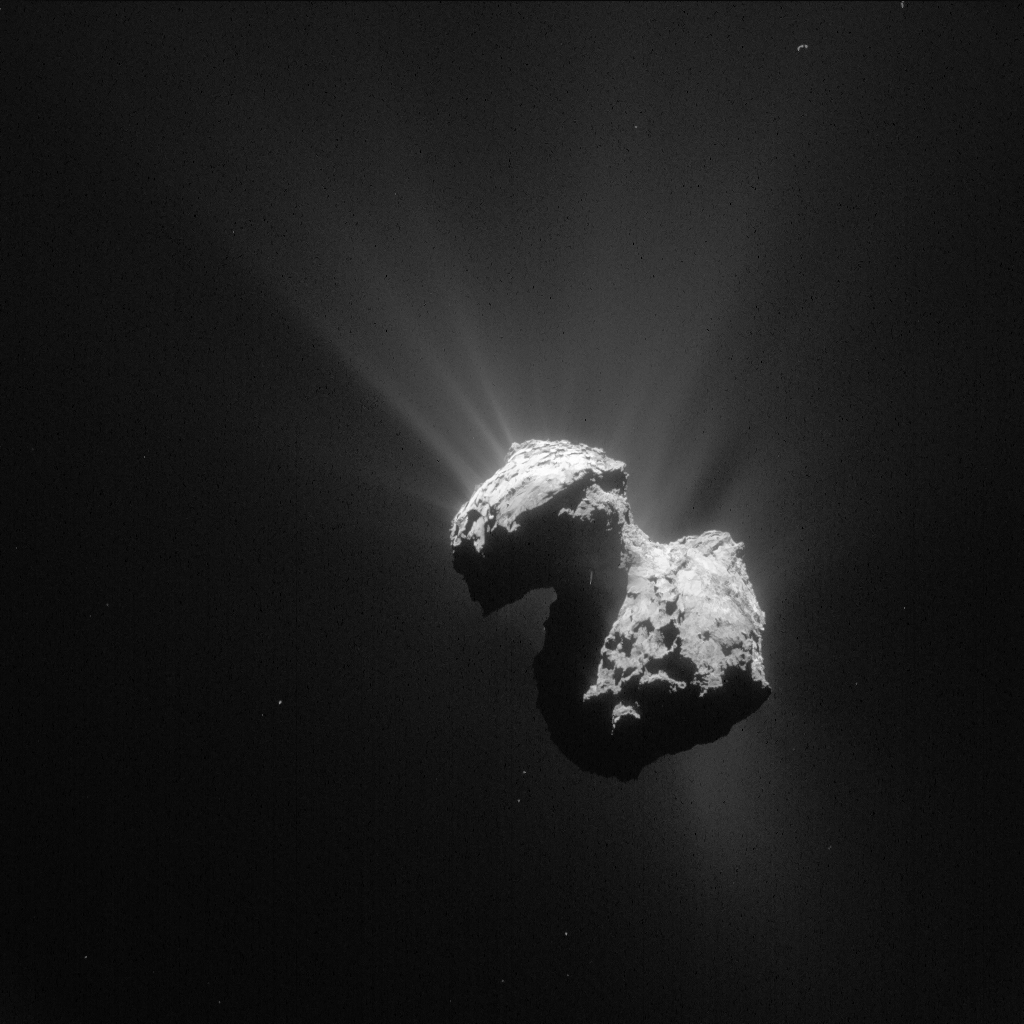
As seen by Rosetta on 7 July 2015

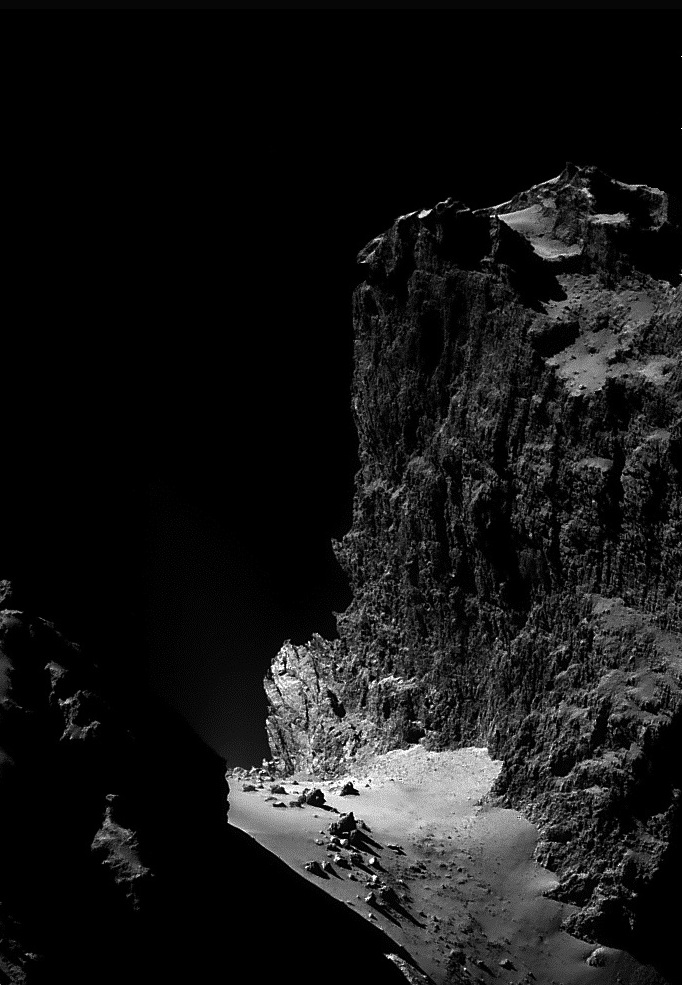
Image showing ragged cliffs, 10 December 2014

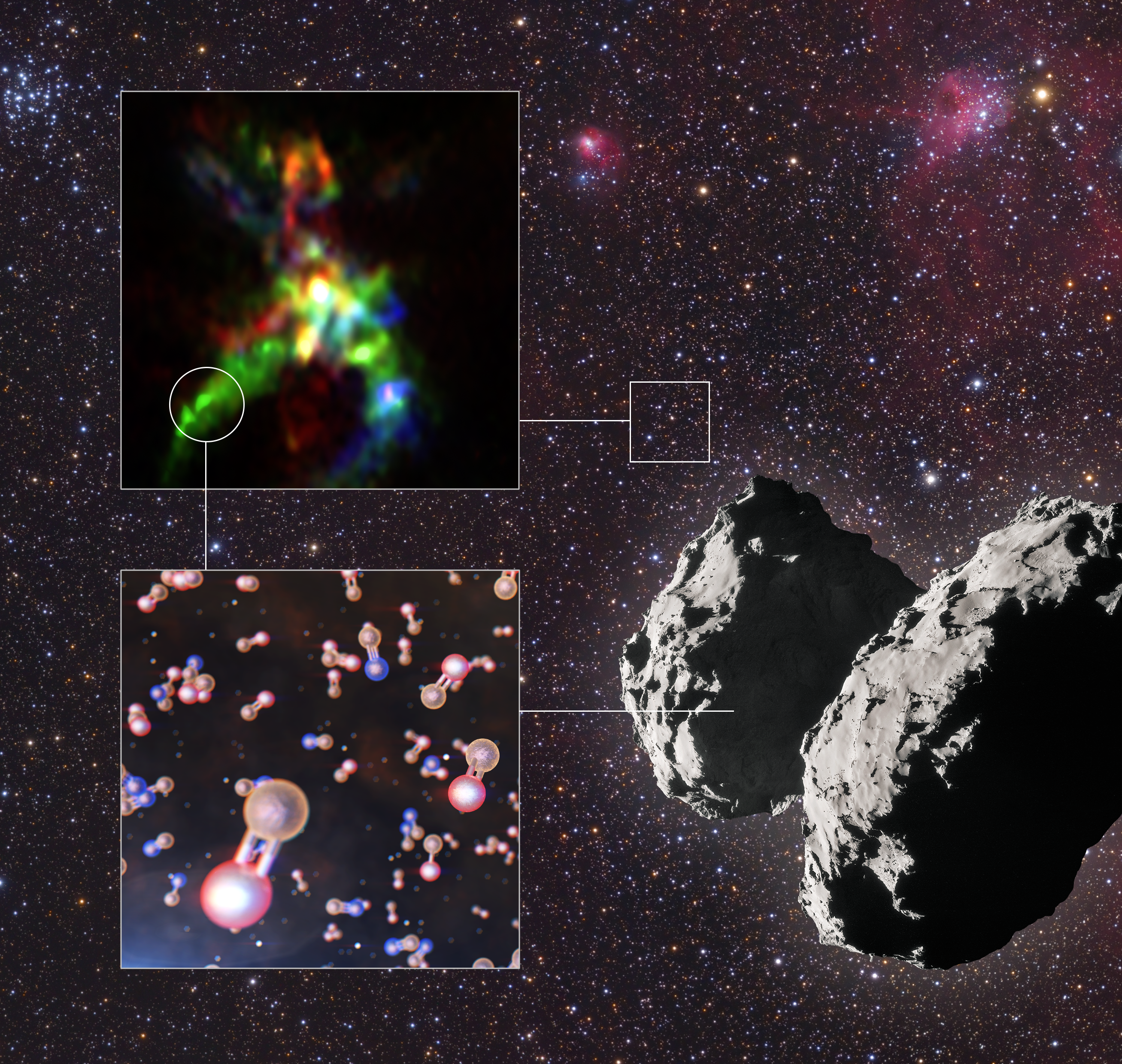
Phosphorus-bearing molecules found in a star-forming region and comet 67P

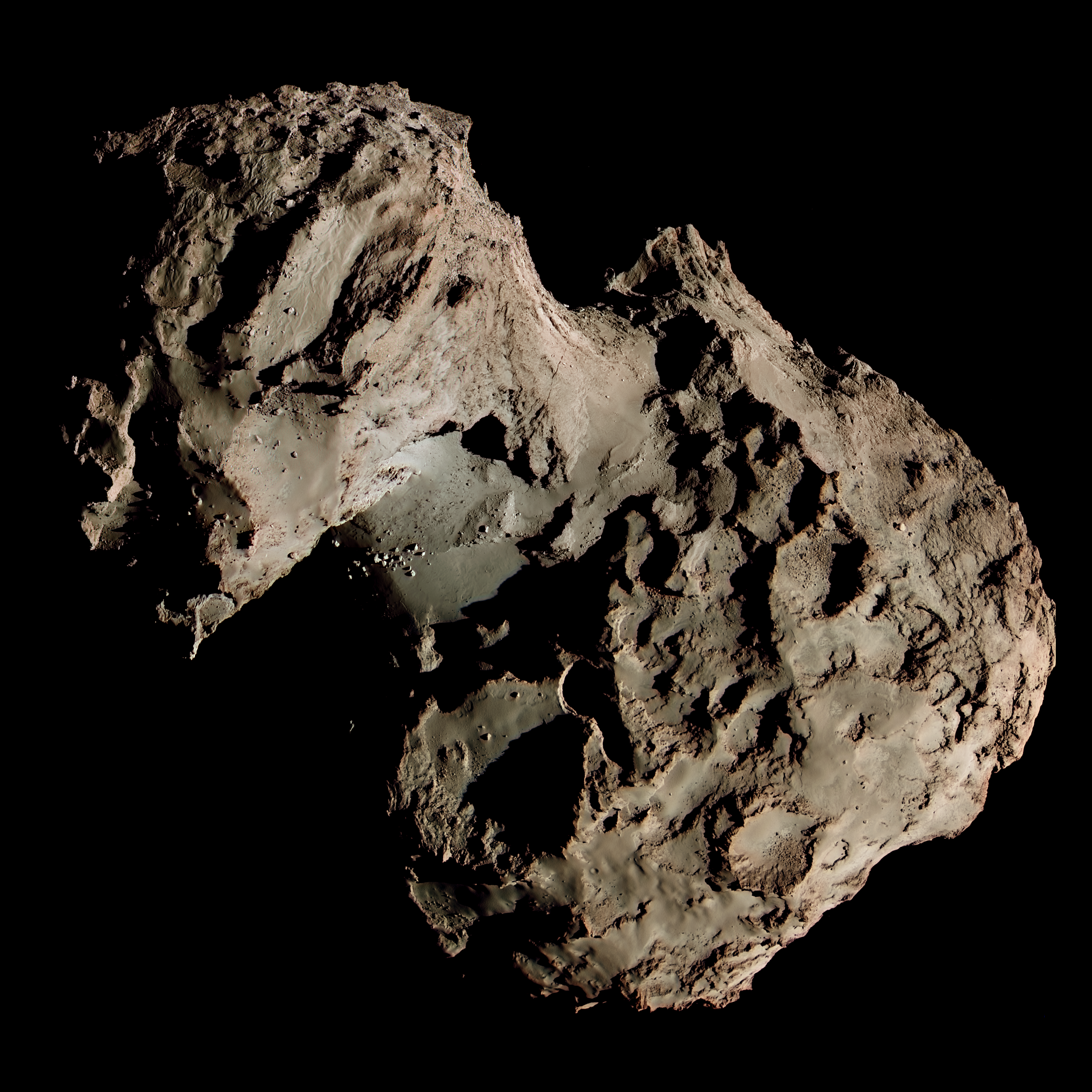
Comet 67P/Churyumov–Gerasimenko in enhanced colour, as imaged by ESA's Rosetta spacecraft in 2015

== See also ==
- List of comets visited by spacecraft
- List of numbered comets § 67P

== Notes ==
Numbered comets
Previous; 66P/du Toit	67P/Churyumov–Gerasimenko	Next; 68P/Klemola
