= Fesenkov Astrophysical Institute =

Kazakhstan research institute

Coordinates: 43.1772°N 76.9660°E

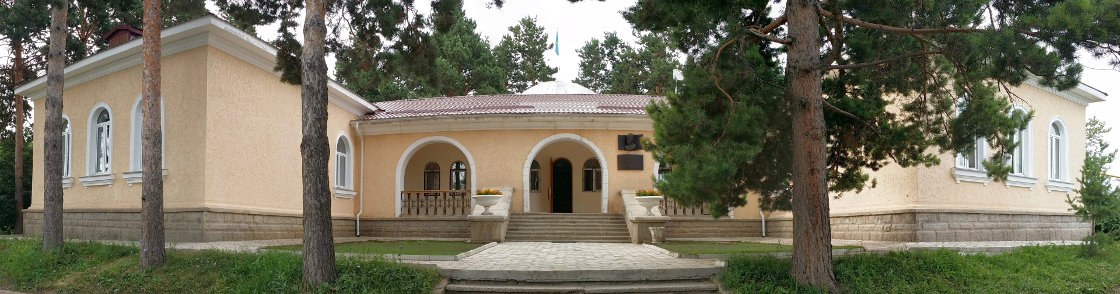
- Abbreviation: FAI
- Formation: 1941
- Type: Research Institute
- Location: Almaty, Kazakhstan
- Director: Omarov Chingis
- Parent organization: National Center for Space Research and Technologies
- Website: fai.kz

Fesenkov Astrophysical Institute (Астрофизический институт имени В. Г. Фесенкова, АФИФ), or FAI, is a research institute in Almaty, Kazakhstan. The institute was founded in 1941 as the Institute for Astronomy and Physics of the Kazakh branch of the USSR Academy of Sciences, when a group of Soviet astronomers was evacuated during World War II from the European parts of the USSR to Almaty. In 1948 G.A. Tikhov had organized an independent sector of astrobotany, and in 1950 astronomers established the Astrophysical Institute of the Kazakh SSR. In 1989 the institute was renamed after Vasily Fesenkov, one of its founders.

FAI conducts both observational and theoretical research. The prime objects of observations are the Sun, outer planets, comets, Herbig Ae/Be stars, and active galaxies. The topics of theoretical research include stellar dynamics and computational astrophysics, active galactic nuclei, cosmology, physics of comets and interstellar medium. The institute runs three observational bases in mountains near Almaty: Kamenskoe Plateau Observatory, Assy-Turgen Observatory and Tien Shan Astronomical Observatory.

FAI is a member of the International Astronomical Union.

== Interesting facts ==
- The comet 67P/Churyumov–Gerasimenko, famous for the Rosetta mission, was discovered at Fesenkov Astrophysical Institute.
- FAI was one of the first institutions where a new branch of science—astrobiology—was born in the middle of the twentieth century.
