= Vasily Fesenkov =

Soviet Russian astrophysicist

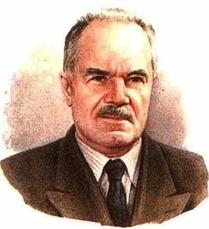
Vasily Fesenkov on a 1988 Soviet Postal cover

Vasiliy Grigorievich Fesenkov (Russian: Василий Григорьевич Фесенков, 13 January 1889 – 12 March 1972) was a Soviet Russian astrophysicist.

== Biography ==
He was born in Novocherkassk. After graduating from the Kharkov University (1911) he entered the Sorbonne, where he defended a dissertation for the Doctor of Science degree in 1914; in between he interned at the Paris, Meudon, and Nice observatories. Fesenkov was one of founders of the Russian astrophysical institute (1923). It was later renamed to Sternberg Astronomical Institute, where he worked as a director in 1936 - 1939. In 1935 Fesenkov was elected an Academician of the USSR Academy of Sciences. He was the first to make a study of Zodiacal light using photometry, and suggested a theory of its dynamics.

He founded the Astrophysical Institute in Alma-Ata (currently Almaty) and was its director until his retirement in 1964. Fesenkov was also a member of the Kazakhstan Academy of Sciences.

He worked on cosmogony, planetary and Solar System astronomy. In 1947 he travelled to the site of the Tunguska event and estimated the mass and orbit of the impact body. He did the same for the Sikhote-Alin Meteorite that fell in 1947.

Fesenkov was awarded three Orders of Lenin, Order of the Red Banner and various medals. The lunar crater Fesenkov is named after him, as is a crater on Mars. A minor planet 2286 Fesenkov discovered in 1977 by Soviet astronomer Nikolai Stepanovich Chernykh is named after him.

He died in Moscow.

== Bibliography ==
- Life in the universe by A. Oparin and V. Fesenkov, New York, Twayne Publishers, 1961
- Soviet IGY studies in zodiacal light by Fesenkov V.G., New York, U. S. Joint Publications Research Service, 1959
