= Timeline of Rosetta (spacecraft) =

Animation of Rosetta's trajectory from 2 March 2004 to 9 September 2016 Rosetta · 67P/Churyumov–Gerasimenko · Earth · Mars · 21 Lutetia · 2867 Šteins

Rosetta is a space probe designed to rendezvous with the comet 67P/Churyumov–Gerasimenko, perform flybys of two asteroids (2867 Šteins and 21 Lutetia), and carry lander Philae until its landing on 67P. This page records a detailed timeline of this mission.

== Launch and cruise phase (2004 - 2014) ==
- 16 February 2004 — The Rosetta spacecraft was placed on top of its Ariane 5 rocket at the Guiana Space Centre, Kourou.
- 26 February 2004 — Countdown was stopped at 20 minutes and 40 seconds before lift off due to strong winds in the upper atmosphere, causing the launch to be rescheduled for the next day.
- 27 February 2004 — Before launch, a piece of detached foam was discovered, which prompted a round of technical inspections. Launch was rescheduled to very early March.
- 2 March 2004 — The spacecraft launched at 07:17 GMT. The Ariane 5 placed the upper stage and the Rosetta spacecraft into an eccentric coast orbit (200 x 4000 km). About two hours later, at 09:14 GMT, the upper stage fired to leave the orbit around the Earth and enter heliocentric orbit. Rosetta was released 18 minutes later, and soon afterwards ESA’s Operations Centre (ESOC) in Darmstadt established contact with the spacecraft.
- 3 March 2004 — The S Band communication commenced with Rosetta, using both low- and high-gain antenna configurations. Also, all reaction wheels were in operation, compensating for large disturbances due to outgassing from the space craft, which was expected to last for a few days in the vacuum of space, whilst trapped atmospheric gases escaped.
- 4 March 2004 — The power subsystem of Rosetta was tested and commissioned.
- 5 March 2004 — Rosetta X band communications were commissioned.
- 7-10 March 2004 — The first three instruments (Cosima, CONSERT(Orbiter part) and Osiris) were activated and completed their initial commissioning activities. The CONSERT Orbiter antenna was also deployed.
- 11 March 2004 — The Rosetta Science Working Team announces that the accuracy of launch made it possible to select two asteroids as targets for a rendezvous fly-by of the probe. "Comets and asteroids are the building blocks of our Earth and the other planets in the Solar System. Rosetta will conduct the most thorough analysis so far of three of these objects," said Prof. David Southwood, Director of ESA's Science Programme in a press release.
- 12-17 March 2004 — Starting on 12 March, the lander was commissioned. Only one step was rescheduled due to early release of the launch locks during the first mission day.
- 17-19 March 2004 — The Rosetta Plasma Consortium (RPC) instruments were commissioned. An issue arose with the redundant power supply, but did not substantially affect the mission. The spacecraft booms, carrying the RPC MIP (Mutual Impedance Probe) and LAP (Langmuir Probe) instruments were deployed by using the primary systems.
- 26 March 2004 — Checking out was completed on three instruments: ROSINA, ALICE, and VIRTIS, during commissioning activities. Each activity took two days and was within or ahead of schedule. The High Gain Antenna (HGA) emission pattern was calibrated by performing spiral maneuvers. The radio station at New Norcia was used to measure antenna gain.
- 30 March 2004 — The RSI (Radio Science Instrument) completed five days of commissioning.
- 3 April 2004 — The MIRO instrument checked out well after three commissioning passes through more spiral maneuvers, during which the planet Venus was scanned.
- 4 April 2004 — The Rosetta spacecraft was pointed into its attitude towards Earth, which is to be kept for the remainder of the year. Slight adjustments are planned to avoid having the sunlight hit Rosetta head-on. (Also called "+X" axis). The GIADA instrument was activated and commissioned.
- 4-9 April 2004 — The last instrument on board Rosetta (MIDAS) was turned on during 4 April and commissioning concluded on 9 April. By this point all science and engineering subsystems had been activated at least once.
  - Use of the radio station at New Norcia was reduced from 11 hours to 7 hours, to allow more time for the Mars Express mission.
- 10-15 April 2004 — From 10 April to 15 April, checking out procedures were conducted on the Philae lander. This second lander activity focused on the lander's payload. The ALICE instrument was activated again and high voltage operations were executed. Other activities were also performed, including an adjustment of the internal heater system due to the decreasing distance to the Sun.
- 17 April 2004 — An attempt was made to open the ALICE detector door. However a pyrotechnic fastener designed to open it did not fire.
- 21 April 2004 — After some investigation, a backup pyro was fired to successfully release the ALICE detector door.
- 25 April 2004 — During a test sequence using an Earth pointing attitude, the thruster temperature (heated by the sun) caused an unplanned "slew" to occur. This mechanism is used to prevent the thrusters from overheating. Due to this maneuver, a planned imaging activity of the Earth-Moon system was cancelled, but the remaining commissioning activities were completed satisfactorily.
- 1 May 2004 — The first scientific observations were performed at this date. The instruments were pointed towards the comet C/2002 T7 (LINEAR), at that time close to the sun.
- 6 May 2004 — In preparation for the first deep space maneuver of Rosetta a total of 12 pyro valves were fired, and the pressure in the reaction control system started to build up as expected.
- 10 May 2004 — The most critical deep space maneuver was successfully executed. The four thrusters on board of Rosetta were fired for about 3.5 hours, and a velocity change (delta v) of 152.8 metre per second was imparted to the spacecraft.
- 16 May 2004 — A planned "touch-up" deep space maneuver was successfully executed. A burn of just under 17 minutes was performed with high accuracy. Then Rosetta pointed its instruments again towards Comet LINEAR for observation.
- 28 May 2004 — ESA released the first pictures taken with the OSIRIS camera during the April 30 observation tests pointed at comet LINEAR. The camera produced high-resolution images of the comet from a distance of about 95 million kilometres.
- 7 June 2004 — Rosetta switched into "Cruise Mode" after completing all steps for commissioning the instruments.
- 25 July 2004 — A week of increased activities during the "Cruise 1" phase included the commissioning of the two navigation cameras by taking pictures of the Earth and the Moon.
- 4 March 2005 — The first planned flyby of Earth was executed successfully. ESA asks amateur astronomers that took pictures of the spacecraft to submit them. Also, tests with the Moon as target standing in for a comet or asteroid, produced pictures and other data as expected.
- March 24 — Rosetta transitioned back into "cruise mode".
- 15 April 2005 — A test of the Near Sun Hibernation Mode (NSHM) was successfully concluded. It started on April 11 and tested a special low activity mode of Rosetta. In this state the gyroscopes and reaction wheels are inactive, and the craft is using the star tracker and the thrusters to control its attitude, only.
- 18 July 2005 — ESA reported that the observation of the Deep Impact encounter with comet Tempel 1 was very successful. Science data was recorded and down-linked to Earth during the period from June 28 until July 14, and the data is currently being analysed.
- 8 August 2005 — Mission members performed an unplanned monitor pass to investigate anomalies in the spacecraft's dynamic behavior. On mission day 213 and 216 a total of 20 grams of fuel were spent and a delta-v of 2.5 mm per second were added unexpectedly.
- 15 September 2005 — Telemetry received showed that a solar flare had hit the spacecraft around September 8 or 9. The star tracker subsystem was left in an abnormal state and needed to be fixed.
- 12 March 2006 — The OSIRIS instrument was trained on the future flyby target asteroid Steins for science observation, and the data was downlinked to Earth over three days just before solar conjunction.
- 6 July 2006 — The spacecraft comes within 0.06 AU of the ion trail of comet 45P/Honda-Mrkos-Pajdusakova and scientific observations are planned for this event.
- 25 February 2007 — The spacecraft approaches Mars up to 250 km.
- 14 November 2007 — Second Earth swing-by for Rosetta passing within 5295 km from the surface.
- 5 September 2008 — Rosetta flies by asteroid 2867 Šteins at a distance of c. 800 km.
- 13 November 2009 — Rosetta flies by Earth. Using the Earth's' gravitational pull to build speed. Rosetta does this on nearly every flyby of a planet.
- 10 July 2010 — Flyby of asteroid 21 Lutetia
- 8 June 2011 — The spacecraft was transferred into a spin stabilised mode and all electronics except the onboard computer and the hibernation heaters were switched off.

== Mission phase (2014 - 2016) ==
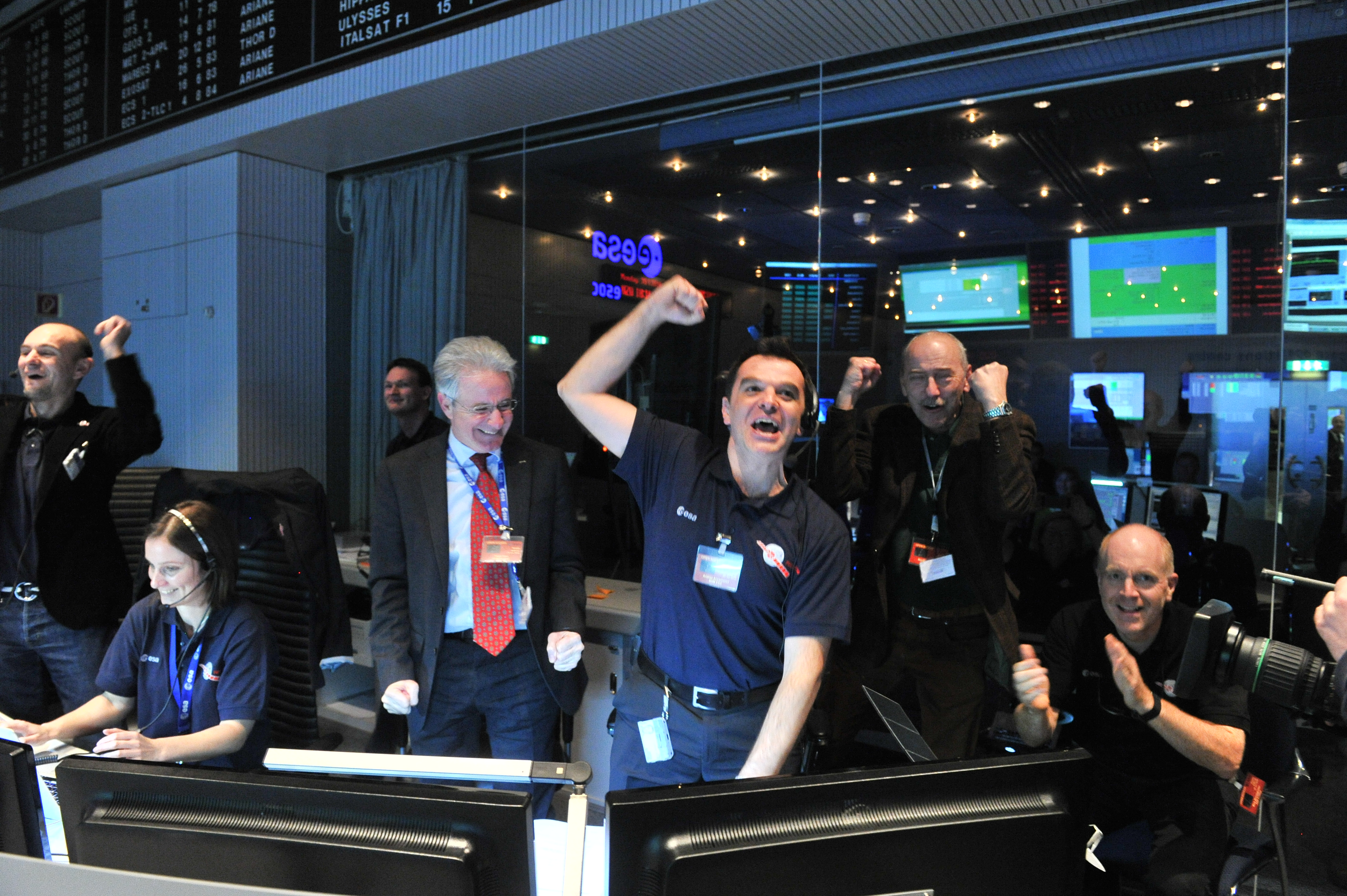
Signal received from Rosetta at the European Space Operations Centre (ESOC) in Darmstadt (January 20, 2014)

- 20 January 2014 — At 10:00 CET the spacecraft woke up and started post-hibernation procedures. Rosetta restored communications with ESA's Operations Centre through NASA’s Goldstone ground station at 18:17 CET. Greets the Earth with a "Hello World" message. The message was received on a very low bit level. Over the next months ESA's job will be to raise communication speed through a software update.
- 7 May 2014 — First of ten Orbital Correction Manoeuvres (OCMs) (1 h 33 min 13 s) to align the trajectories of Rosetta and 67P/C-G, delta-v of 20 m/s (66 ft/s) (approximate distance to 67P/C-G - 1,900,000 km (1,200,000 mi))
- 21 May 2014 — OCM 2 of 10, longest burn (7 h 16 min) with largest delta-v (291 m/s (950 ft/s)) using approximately 218 kg (481 lb) of fuel (approximate distance to 67P/C-G - 1,000,000 km (620,000 mi))
- 4 June 2014 — OCM 3 of 10, 6 h 39 min burn time with a delta-v of 269.5 m/s (884 ft/s) using approximately 190 kg (420 lb) of fuel (approximate distance to 67P/C-G - 425,000 km (264,000 mi))
- 18 June 2014 — OCM 4 of 10, 2 h 20 min burn time with a delta-v of 88.7 m/s (291 ft/s), this was an over performance of 5%, the first notable deviation from expected performance. (approximate distance to 67P/C-G - 195,000 km)
- 2 July 2014 — OCM 5 of 10, delta-v of 59 m/s (approximate distance to 67P/C-G - 52,000 km)
- 9 July 2014 — OCM 6 of 10, delta-v of 25 m/s (approximate distance to 67P/C-G - 22,000 km)
- 16 July 2014 — OCM 7 of 10, delta-v of 11 m/s (approximate distance to 67P/C-G - 9,600 km)
- 23 July 2014 — OCM 8 of 10, delta-v of 4.5 m/s (approximate distance to 67P/C-G - 4,100 km)
- 3 August 2014 — OCM 9 of 10, delta-v of 3.2 m/s (approximate distance to 67P/C-G - 1,000 km)
- 6 August 2014 — OCM 10 of 10, delta-v of 1 m/s. Rosetta enters a hyperbolic orbit around 67P/C-G, becoming the first man made object to enter orbit around a comet.
- 4 September 2014 — The first science data from Rosetta's ALICE instrument was reported, showing that the comet is unusually dark in ultraviolet wavelengths, hydrogen and oxygen are present in the coma, and no significant areas of water-ice have been found on the comet's surface. Water-ice was expected to be found as the comet is too far from the Sun to turn water into vapor.
- 10 September 2014 — Rosetta enters the Global Mapping Phase, orbiting 67/C-G at an altitude of 29 km (18 mi).
- 12 November 2014 — Philae successfully landed after touching down three times, on the surface of 67P/G-C without firing its harpoons. Touchdown 16:08 GMT.
- 15 November 2014 — Philae battery exhausted after insufficient collection of solar energy. It is possible that the conditions may change as the comet moves closer to the Sun, making it possible to charge the battery.
- 10 December 2014 — The Rosetta's Rosina mass spectrometers report that the ratio of heavy water to normal water on comet 67P is more than three times that on Earth. The ratio is regarded as a distinctive signature and the discovery means that Earth's water is unlikely to have originated from comets like 67P.
- 14 April 2015 — Scientists report that the comet's nucleus has no magnetic field of its own.
- 13 June 2015 — Philae lander says "Hello" and comes back online.

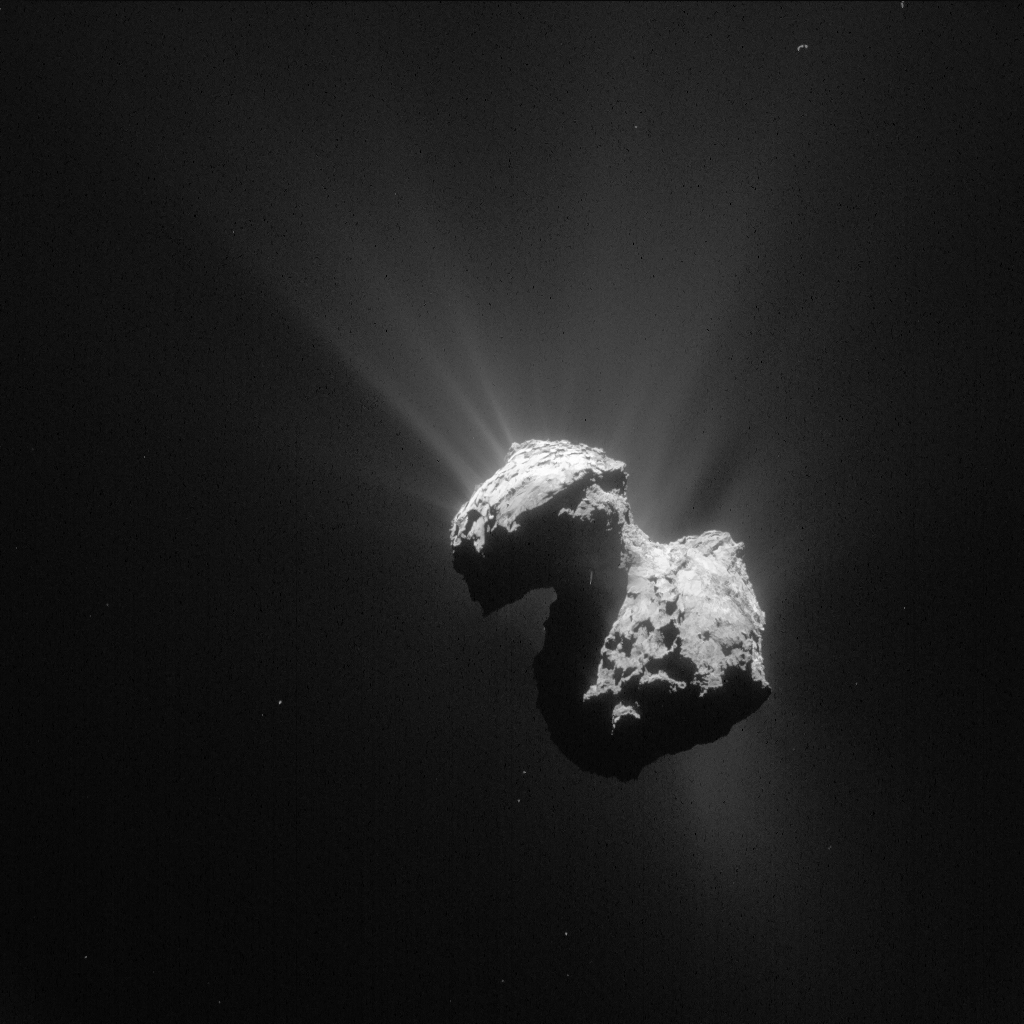
67/P on 7 July

- 29 July 2015 — Published analysis of the comet interaction with the solar wind.
- 12 July 2015 — OSIRIS photographs Pluto.
- 17 July 2015 — Rosetta/Philae Outreach Team wins Sir Arthur Clarke Award.
- 3 August 2015 — First release of the science data from Rosetta instruments - COSIMA, OSIRIS, ROSINA and RPC-MAG.
- 13 August 2015 — 67P/Churyumov–Gerasimenko reaches perihelion.
- 11 September 2015 — ESA releases details on Philae wakeup in June.
- 14 September 2015 — Gaia photographs 67/P.
- 23 September 2015 — Release of studies of the water-ice cycle on a comet.
- 25 September 2015 — Detection of argon on a comet is announced.
- 28 September 2015 — Scientists release an answer to how comet got its shape.
- September - October 2015 — From late September to early October Rosetta flew up to 1500 km away from the comet for further study while it's still near the perihelion.
- 1 October 2015 — Scientists release the results of a first study of the comet's southern pole made in August and October 2015.
- 28 October 2015 — First detection of the molecular oxygen on a comet is announced.
- 12 November 2015 — Release of the SESAME-CASSE instrument recording listening to MUPUS hammering the surface.
- 13 January 2016 — Confirmation that the exposed ice on a surface of the comet is indeed water ice.
- 2 September 2016 — Rosetta finds its lander Philae wedged against a large overhang.
- 30 September 2016 — The Rosetta spacecraft ended its mission by an attempt to soft-land close to a 130 m (425 ft) wide pit, called Deir el-Medina, on comet 67P. The walls of the pit contain 0.91 m (3 ft) wide so-called "goose bumps", considered to be building blocks of the comet.

== See also ==
- List of Solar System probes
- Uncrewed spacecraft
