= Philae (spacecraft) =

Robotic European Space Agency lander that accompanied the Rosetta spacecraft

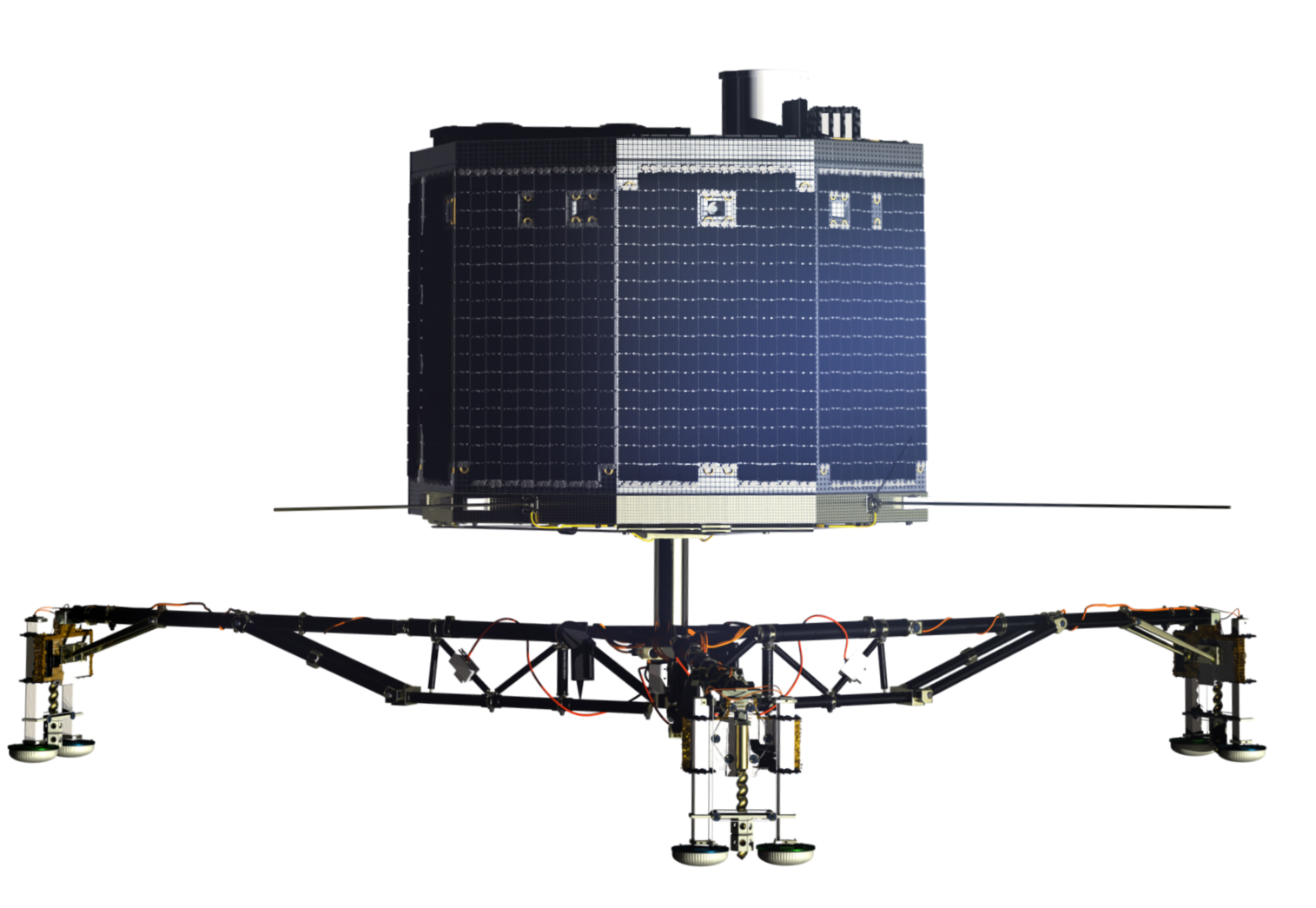
- Illustration of Philae
- Mission type: Comet lander
- Operator: European Space Agency / DLR
- COSPAR ID: 2004-006C
- Website: www.esa.int/rosetta
- Mission duration: Planned: 1–6 weeks Active: 12–14 November 2014; Hibernation: 15 November 2014 – 13 June 2015

Spacecraft properties
- Manufacturer: CNES; DLR; ASI
- Launch mass: 100 kg (220 lb)
- Payload mass: 21 kg (46 lb)
- Dimensions: 1 × 1 × 0.8 m (3.3 × 3.3 × 2.6 ft)
- Power: 32 watts at 3 AU

Start of mission
- Launch date: 2 March 2004, 07:17 UTC
- Rocket: Ariane 5G+ V-158
- Launch site: Kourou ELA-3
- Contractor: Arianespace

End of mission
- Last contact: 9 July 2015, 18:07 UTC

67P/Churyumov–Gerasimenko lander
- Landing date: 12 November 2014, 17:32 UTC
- Landing site: Abydos
Instruments
- APXS: Alpha particle x-ray spectrometer
- CIVA: Comet nucleus Infrared and Visible Analyser
- CONSERT: Comet Nucleus Sounding Experiment by Radiowave Transmission
- COSAC: Cometary Sampling and Composition
- MUPUS: Multi-purpose Sensors for Surface and Subsurface Science
- PTOLEMY: Gas chromatograph and medium resolution mass spectrometer
- ROLIS: Rosetta Lander Imaging System
- ROMAP: Rosetta lander Magnetometer and Plasma monitor
- SD2: Sampling, Drilling and Distribution
- SESAME: Surface Electric Sounding and Acoustic Monitoring Experiment
- CASSE: Comet Acoustic Surface Sounding Experiment
- DIM: Dust Impact Monitor
- PP: Permittivity Probe

Philae (/ˈfaɪliː/ or /ˈfiːleɪ/) is a robotic European Space Agency lander that accompanied the Rosetta spacecraft until it separated to land on comet 67P/Churyumov–Gerasimenko, ten years and eight months after departing Earth. On 12 November 2014, Philae touched down on the comet, but it bounced when its anchoring harpoons failed to deploy and a thruster designed to hold the probe to the surface did not fire. After bouncing off the surface twice, Philae achieved the first-ever "soft" (nondestructive) landing on a comet nucleus, although the lander's final, uncontrolled touchdown left it in a non-optimal location and orientation. Philae transmitted images and data back to earth for about 64 hours.

Despite the landing problems, the probe's instruments obtained the first images from a comet's surface. Several of the instruments on Philae made the first in-situ analysis of a comet nucleus, sending back data regarding the composition of the surface and outgassing from the subsurface. In October 2020, scientific journal Nature published an article revealing what Philae had discovered while it was operational on the surface of 67P/Churyumov–Gerasimenko.

On 15 November 2014 Philae entered safe mode, or hibernation, after its batteries ran down due to reduced sunlight and an off-nominal spacecraft orientation at the crash site. Mission controllers hoped that additional sunlight on the solar panels might be sufficient to reboot the lander. Philae communicated sporadically with Rosetta from 13 June to 9 July 2015, but contact was then lost. The lander's location was known to within a few tens of metres but it could not be seen. Its location was finally identified in photographs taken by Rosetta on 2 September 2016 as the orbiter was sent on orbits closer to the comet. The now-silent Philae was lying on its side in a deep crack in the shadow of a cliff. Knowledge of its location would help in interpretation of the images it had sent. On 30 September 2016, the Rosetta spacecraft ended its mission by crashing in the comet's Ma'at region.

The lander is named after the Philae obelisk, which bears a bilingual inscription and was used along with the Rosetta Stone to decipher Egyptian hieroglyphs. Philae was monitored and operated from DLR's Lander Control Center in Cologne, Germany, supported by the CNES's SONC in Toulouse, France.

== Mission ==
Video report by the German Aerospace Centre about Philae's landing mission. (10 min, English, in 1080p HD)

Philae's mission was to land successfully on the surface of a comet, attach itself, and transmit data about the comet's composition. The Rosetta spacecraft and Philae lander were launched on an Ariane 5G+ rocket from French Guiana on 2 March 2004, 07:17 UTC, and travelled for 3,907 days (10.7 years) to Churyumov–Gerasimenko. Unlike the Deep Impact probe, which by design struck comet Tempel 1's nucleus on 4 July 2005, Philae is not an impactor. Some of the instruments on the lander were used for the first time as autonomous systems during the Mars flyby on 25 February 2007. CIVA, one of the camera systems, returned some images while the Rosetta instruments were powered down, while ROMAP took measurements of the Martian magnetosphere. Most of the other instruments needed contact with the surface for analysis and stayed offline during the flyby. An optimistic estimate of mission length following touchdown was "four to five months".

=== Scientific goals ===
The goals of the scientific mission have been summarised as follows:

"The scientific goals of its experiments focus on elemental, isotopic, molecular and mineralogical composition of the cometary material, the characterization of physical properties of the surface and subsurface material, the large-scale structure and the magnetic and plasma environment of the nucleus. In particular, surface and sub-surface samples will be acquired and sequentially analyzed by a suite of instruments. Measurements will be performed primarily during descent and along the first five days following touch-down. "

== Landing and surface operations ==
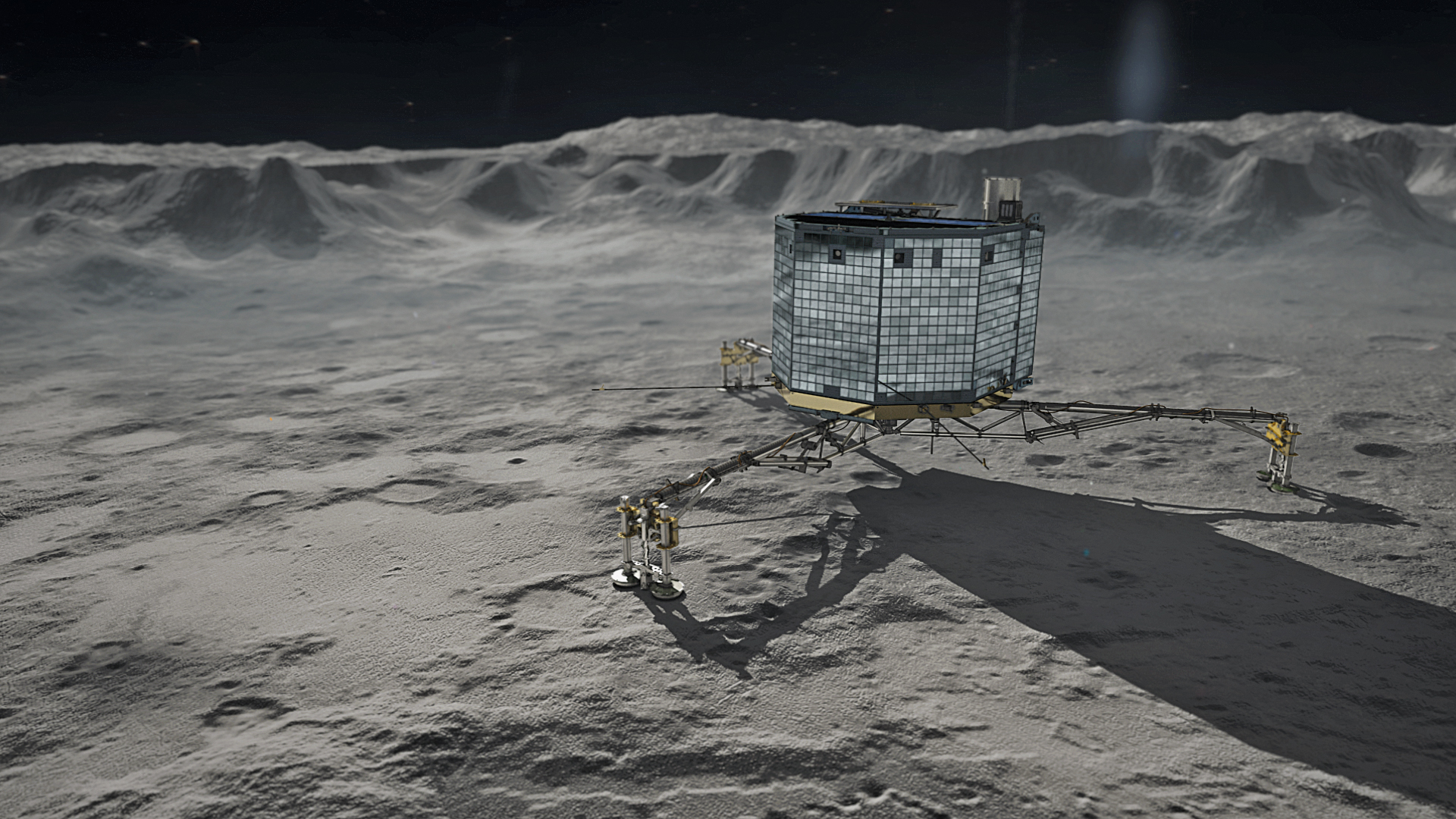
Depiction of Philae on Churyumov-Gerasimenko

Philae remained attached to the Rosetta spacecraft after rendezvousing with Churyumov–Gerasimenko on 6 August 2014. On 15 September 2014, ESA announced "Site J" on the smaller lobe of the comet as the lander's destination. Following an ESA public contest in October 2014, Site J was renamed Agilkia in honour of Agilkia Island.

A series of four go/no-go checks were performed on 11–12 November 2014. One of the final tests before detachment from Rosetta showed that the lander's cold-gas thruster was not working correctly, but the "go" was given anyway, as it could not be repaired. Philae detached from Rosetta on 12 November 2014 at 08:35 UTC SCET.

=== Landing events ===
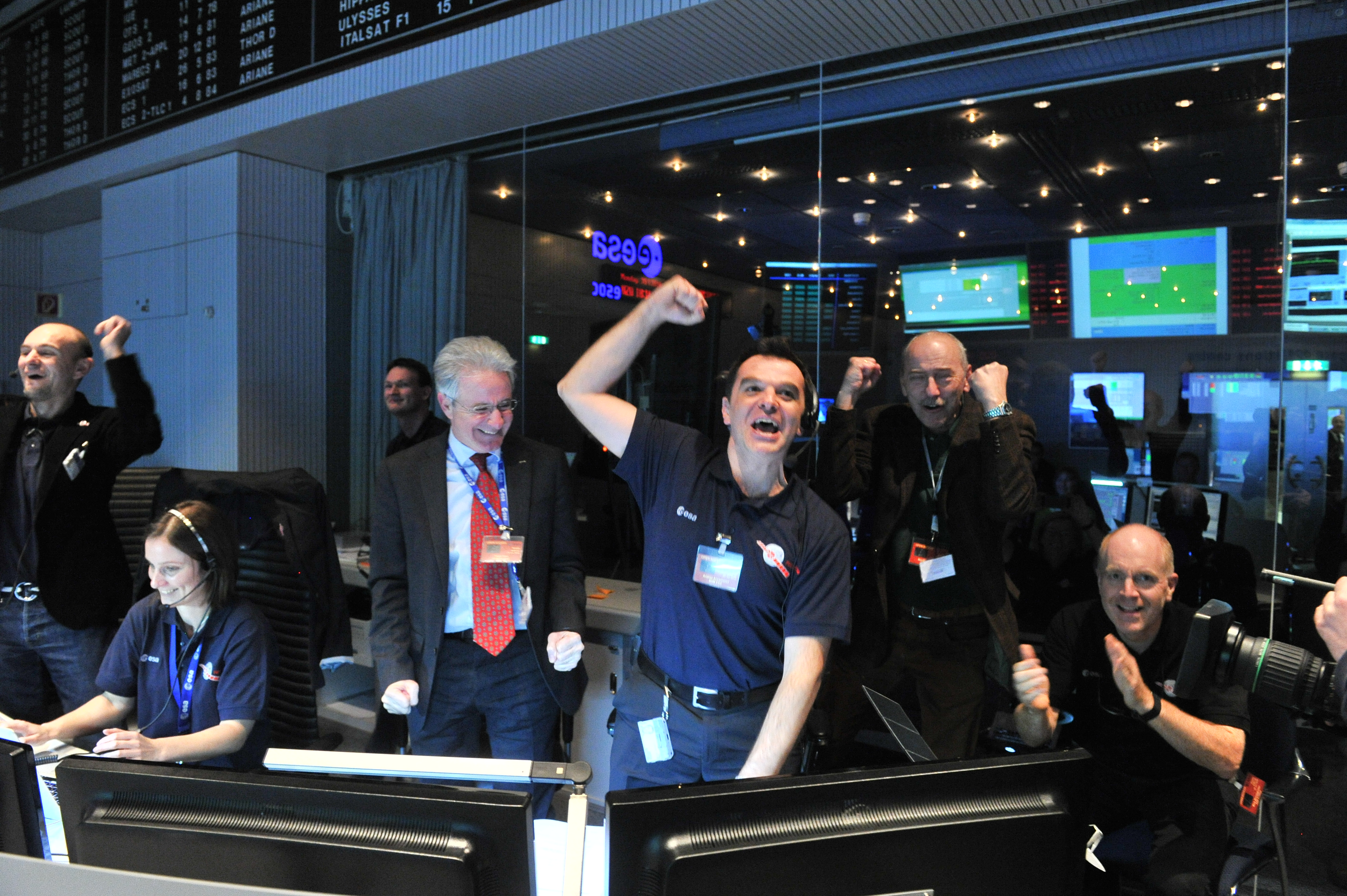
Rosetta signal received at ESOC in Darmstadt, Germany (20 January 2014)

Philae's landing signal was received by Earth communication stations at 16:03 UTC after a 28-minute delay. Unknown to mission scientists at that time, the lander had bounced. It began performing scientific measurements while slowly moving away from the comet and coming back down, confusing the science team. Further analysis showed that it bounced twice.

Philae's first contact with the comet occurred at 15:34:04 UTC SCET. The probe rebounded off the comet's surface at 38 cm/s (15 in/s) and rose to an altitude of approximately 1 km (0.6 mi). For perspective, had the lander exceeded about 44 cm/s (17 in/s), it would have escaped the comet's gravity. After detecting the touchdown, Philae's reaction wheel was automatically powered off, resulting in its momentum being transferred back into the lander. This caused the vehicle to begin rotating every 13 seconds. During this first bounce, at 16:20 UTC SCET, the lander is thought to have struck a surface prominence, which slowed its rotation to once every 24 seconds and sent the craft tumbling. Philae touched down a second time at 17:25:26 UTC SCET and rebounded at 3 cm/s (1.2 in/s). The lander came to a final stop on the surface at 17:31:17 UTC SCET. It sits in rough terrain, apparently in the shadow of a nearby cliff or crater wall, and is canted at an angle of around 30 degrees, but is otherwise undamaged. Its final location was determined initially by analysis of data from CONSERT in combination with the comet shape model based on images from the Rosetta orbiter, and later precisely by direct imaging from Rosetta.

An analysis of telemetry indicated that the initial impact was softer than expected, that the harpoons had not deployed, and that the thruster had not fired. The harpoon propulsion system contained 0.3 grams of nitrocellulose, which was shown by Copenhagen Suborbitals in 2013 to be unreliable in a vacuum.

=== Operations and communication loss ===
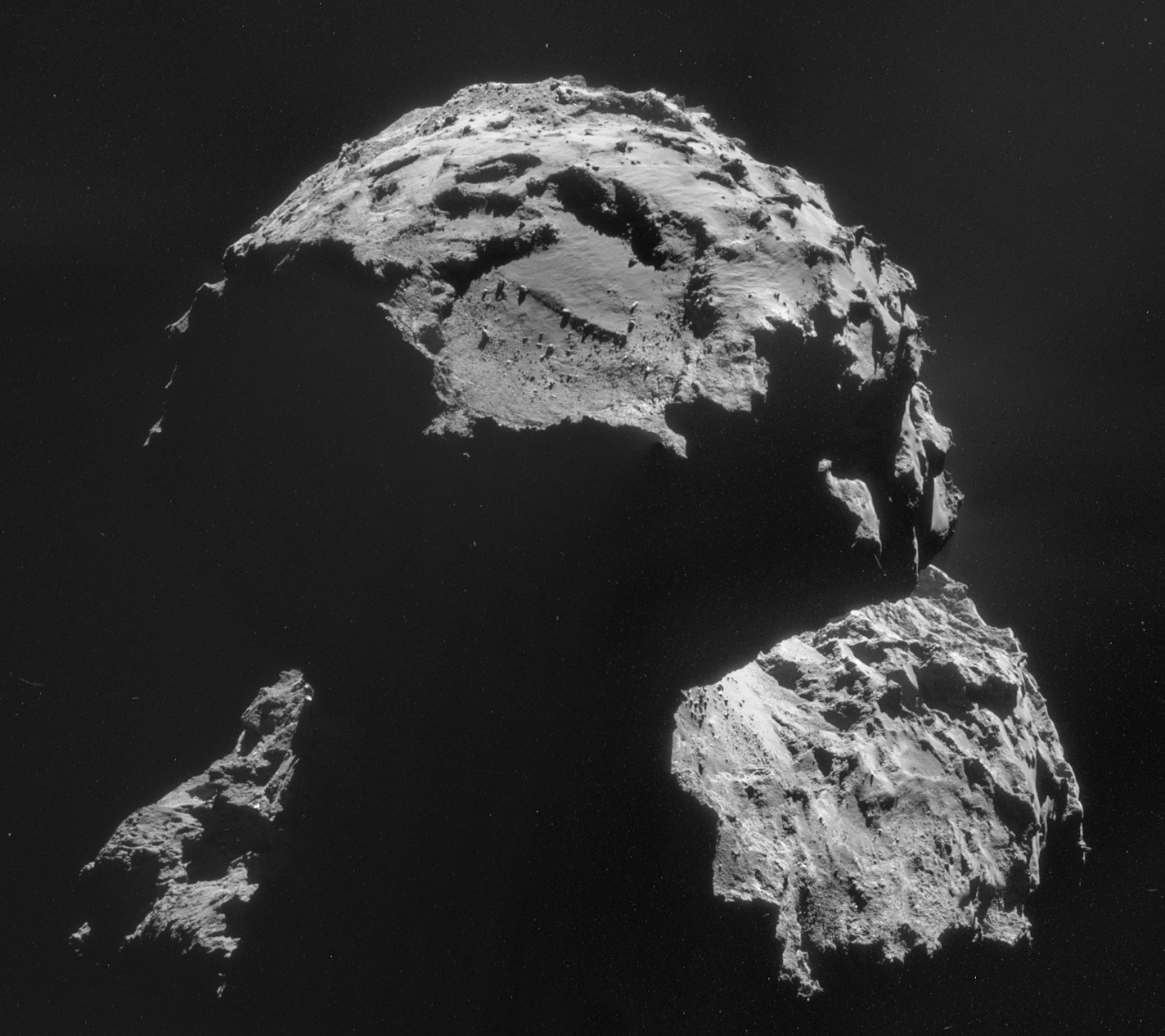
Philae's intended landing site Agilkia (Site J)

The primary battery was designed to power the instruments for about 60 hours. ESA expected that a secondary rechargeable battery would be partially filled by the solar panels attached to the outside of the lander, but the limited sunlight (90 minutes per 12.4-hour comet day) at the actual landing site was inadequate to maintain Philae's activities, at least in this phase of the comet's orbit.

On the morning of 14 November 2014, the battery charge was estimated to be only enough for continuing operations for the remainder of the day. After first obtaining data from instruments whose operation did not require mechanical movement, comprising about 80% of the planned initial science observations, both the MUPUS soil penetrator and the SD2 drill were commanded to deploy. Subsequently, MUPUS data as well as COSAC and Ptolemy data were returned. A final set of CONSERT data was also downlinked towards the end of operations. During the evening's transmission session, Philae was raised by 4 centimetres (1.6 in) and its body rotated 35 degrees to more favourably position the largest solar panel to capture the most sunlight in the future. Shortly afterwards, electrical power dwindled rapidly and all instruments were forced to shut down. The downlink rate slowed to a trickle before coming to a stop. Contact was lost on 15 November at 00:36 UTC.

The German Aerospace Center's lander manager Stephan Ulamec stated:

Prior to falling silent, the lander was able to transmit all science data gathered during the First Science Sequence ... This machine performed magnificently under tough conditions, and we can be fully proud of the incredible scientific success Philae has delivered.

=== Instrument results ===
Data from the SESAME instrument determined that, rather than being "soft and fluffy" as expected, Philae's first touchdown site held a large amount of water ice under a layer of granular material about 25 cm (9.8 in) deep. It found that the mechanical strength of the ice was high and that cometary activity in that region was low. At the final landing site, the MUPUS instrument was unable to hammer very far into the comet's surface, despite power being gradually increased. This area was determined to have the consistency of solid ice or pumice.

In the atmosphere of the comet, the COSAC instrument detected the presence of molecules containing carbon and hydrogen. Soil elements could not be assessed, because the lander was unable to drill into the comet surface, likely due to hard ice. The SD2 drill went through the necessary steps to deliver a surface sample to the COSAC instrument, but nothing entered the COSAC ovens.

Upon Philae's first touchdown on the comet's surface, COSAC measured material at the bottom of the vehicle, which was disturbed by the landing, while the Ptolemy instrument measured material at the top of the vehicle. Sixteen organic compounds were detected, four of which were seen for the first time on a comet, including acetamide, acetone, methyl isocyanate and propionaldehyde.

=== Reawakening and subsequent loss of communication ===
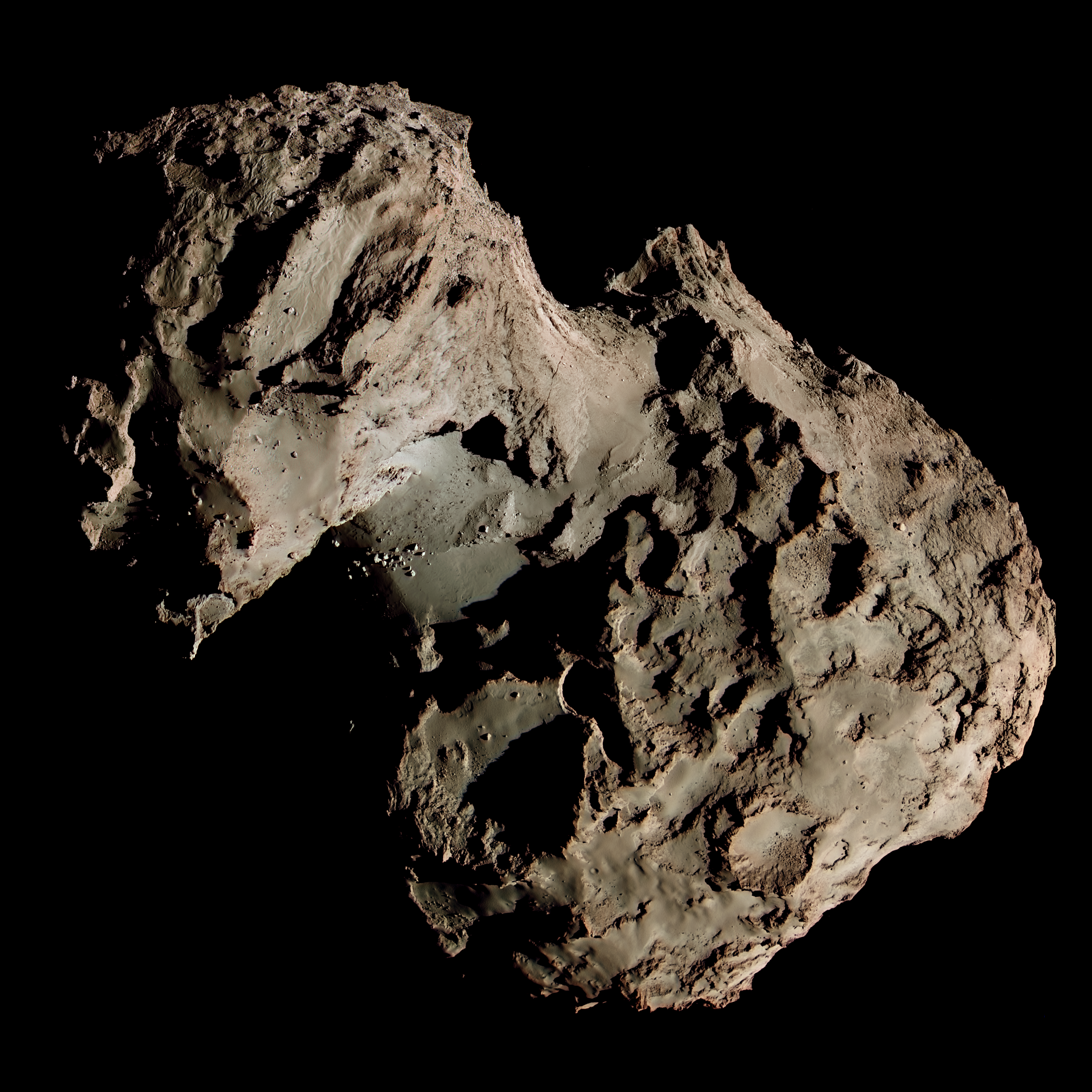
Comet Churyumov–Gerasimenko in March 2015 as imaged by Rosetta in true colour

On 13 June 2015 at 20:28 UTC, ground controllers received an 85-second transmission from Philae, forwarded by Rosetta, indicating that the lander was in good health and had sufficiently recharged its batteries to come out of safe mode. Philae sent historical data indicating that although it had been operating earlier than 13 June 2015, it had been unable to contact Rosetta before that date. The lander reported that it was operating with 24 watts of electrical power at −35 °C (−31 °F).

A new contact between Rosetta and Philae was confirmed on 19 June 2015. The first signal was received on the ground from Rosetta at 13:37 UTC, while a second signal was received at 13:54 UTC. These contacts lasted about two minutes each and delivered additional status data. By 26 June 2015, there had been a total of seven intermittent contacts between the lander and orbiter. There were two opportunities for contact between the two spacecraft each Earth day, but their duration and quality depended on the orientation of the transmitting antenna on Philae and the location of Rosetta along its trajectory around the comet. Similarly, as the comet rotated, Philae was not always in sunlight and thus not always generating enough power via its solar panels to receive and transmit signals. ESA controllers continued to try to establish a stable contact duration of at least 50 minutes.

Had Philae landed at the planned site of Agilkia in November 2014, its mission would probably have ended in March 2015 due to the higher temperatures of that location as solar heating increased. As of June 2015, Philae's key remaining experiment was to drill into the comet's surface to determine its chemical composition. Ground controllers sent commands to power up the CONSERT radar instrument on 5 July 2015, but received no immediate response from the lander. Confirmation was eventually received on 9 July, when the lander transmitted measurement data from the instrument.

Immediately after its reawakening, housekeeping data suggested that the lander's systems were healthy, and mission control uploaded commands for Rosetta to establish a new orbit and nadir so as to optimize communications, diagnostics, and enable new science investigations with Philae. However, controllers had difficulties establishing a stable communications connection with the lander. The situation was not helped by the need to keep Rosetta at a greater and safer distance from the comet as it became more active. The last communication was on 9 July 2015, and mission controllers were unable to instruct Philae to carry out new investigations. Subsequently, Philae failed to respond to further commands, and by January 2016, controllers acknowledged no further communications were likely.

On 27 July 2016, at 09:00 UTC, ESA switched off the Electrical Support System Processor Unit (ESS) onboard Rosetta, making further communications with Philae impossible.

=== Location ===
The lander was located on 2 September 2016 by the narrow-angle camera aboard Rosetta as it was slowly making its descent to the comet. The search for the lander had been on-going during the Rosetta mission, using telemetry data and comparison of pictures taken before and after the lander's touchdown, looking for signs of the lander's specific reflectivity.

The search area was narrowed down to the most promising candidate, which was confirmed by a picture taken at a distance of 2.7 km (1.7 mi), clearly showing the lander. The lander sits on its side wedged into a dark crevice of the comet, explaining the lack of electrical power and proper communication with the probe. Knowing its exact location provides information needed to put Philae's two days of science into proper context.

== Design ==
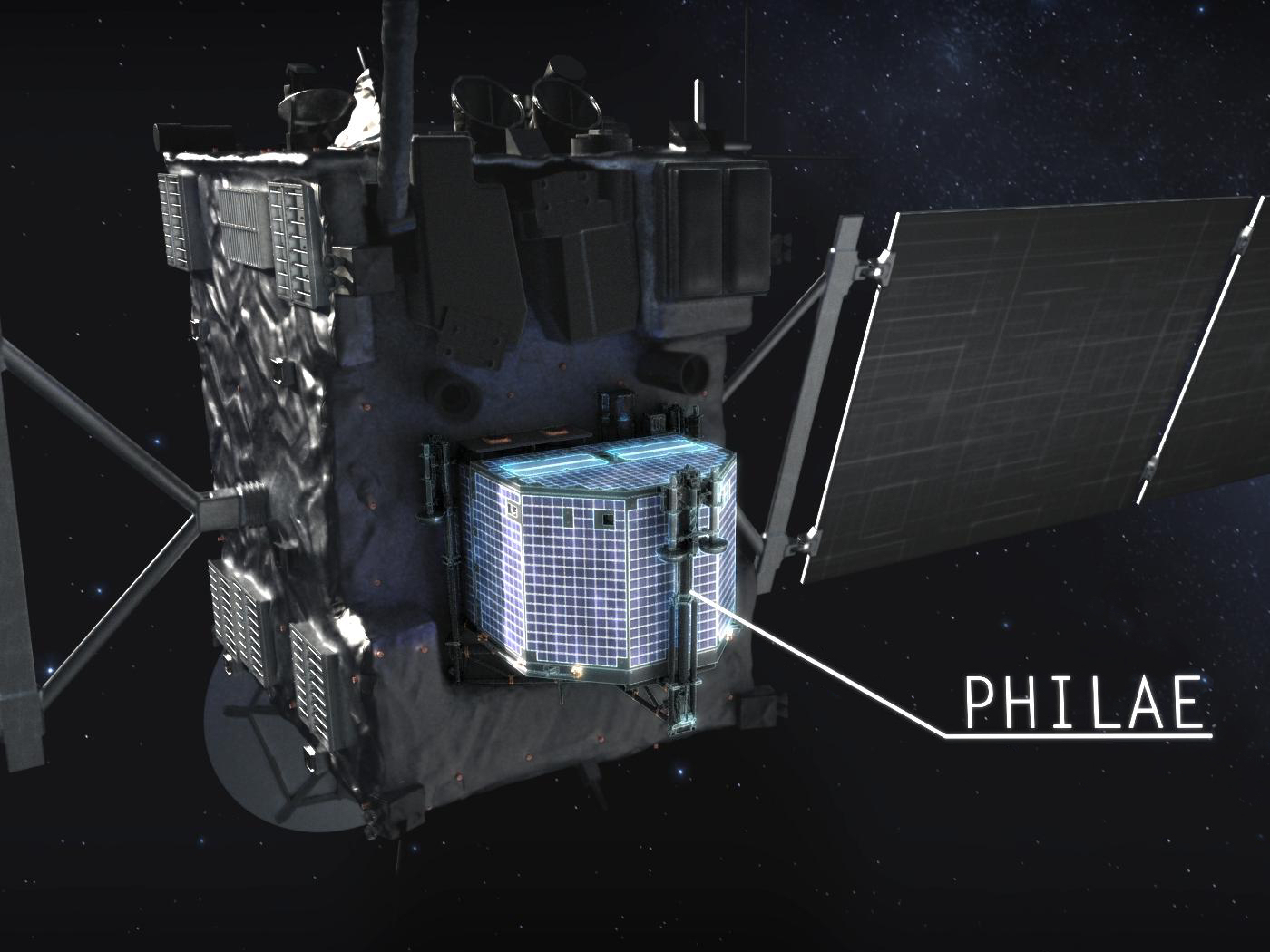
Rosetta and Philae

The lander was designed to deploy from the main spacecraft body and descend from an orbit of 22.5 kilometres (14 mi) along a ballistic trajectory. It would touch down on the comet's surface at a velocity of around 1 metre per second (3.6 km/h; 2.2 mph). The legs were designed to dampen the initial impact to avoid bouncing as the comet's escape velocity is only around 1 m/s (3.6 km/h; 2.2 mph), and the impact energy was intended to drive ice screws into the surface. Philae was to then fire a harpoon into the surface at 70 m/s (250 km/h; 160 mph) to anchor itself. A thruster on top of Philae was to have fired to lessen the bounce upon impact and to reduce the recoil from harpoon firing. During the landing, the harpoons did not fire and the thruster failed to operate, leading to a multiple-contact landing.

Communications with Earth used the Rosetta orbiter as a relay station to reduce the electrical power needed. The mission duration on the surface was planned to be at least one week, but an extended mission lasting months was considered possible.

The main structure of the lander is made from carbon fiber, shaped into a plate maintaining mechanical stability, a platform for the science instruments, and a hexagonal "sandwich" to connect all the parts. The total mass is about 100 kilograms (220 lb). Its exterior is covered with solar cells for power generation.

The Rosetta mission was originally planned to rendezvous with the comet 46P/Wirtanen. A failure in a previous Ariane 5 launch vehicle closed the launch window to reach the comet with the same rocket. It resulted in a change in target to the comet 67P/Churyumov–Gerasimenko. The larger mass of Churyumov–Gerasimenko and the resulting increased impact velocity required that the landing gear of the lander be strengthened.

Spacecraft component	Mass	
Structure	18.0 kg	39.7 lb
Thermal control system	3.9 kg	8.6 lb
Power system	12.2 kg	27 lb
Active descent system	4.1 kg	9.0 lb
Reaction wheel	2.9 kg	6.4 lb
Landing gear	10.0 kg	22 lb
Anchoring system	1.4 kg	3.1 lb
Central data management system	2.9 kg	6.4 lb
Telecommunications system	2.4 kg	5.3 lb
Common electronics box	9.8 kg	22 lb
Mechanical support system, harness, balancing mass	3.6 kg	7.9 lb
Scientific payload	26.7 kg	59 lb
Sum	97.9 kg	216 lb

=== Power management ===
Philae's power management was planned for two phases. In the first phase, the lander operated solely on battery power. In the second phase, it was to run on backup batteries recharged by solar cells.

The power subsystem comprises two batteries: a non-rechargeable primary 1000 watt-hour battery to provide power for the first 60 hours and a secondary 140 watt-hour battery recharged by the solar panels to be used after the primary is exhausted. The solar panels cover 2.2 square metres (24 sq ft) and were designed to deliver up to 32 watts at a distance of 3 AU from the Sun.

=== Instruments ===
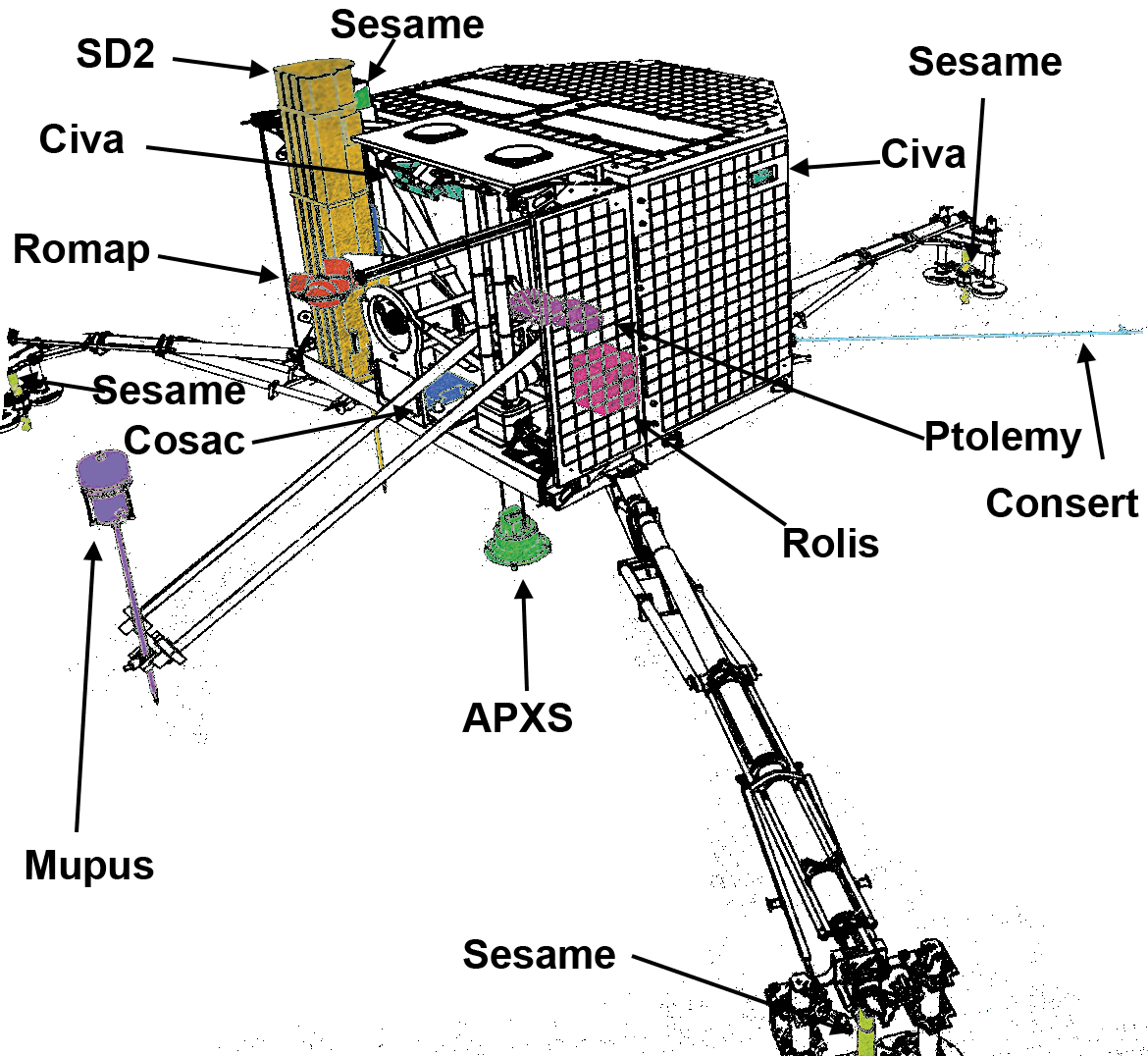
Philae's instruments

The science payload of the lander consists of ten instruments totalling 26.7 kilograms (59 lb), making up just over one quarter of the mass of the lander.

APXS
The Alpha Particle X-ray Spectrometer detects alpha particles and X-rays, which provide information on the elemental composition of the comet's surface. The instrument is an improved version of the APXS on the Mars Pathfinder.

CIVA
The Comet Nucleus Infrared and Visible Analyser (sometimes given as ÇIVA) is a group of seven identical cameras used to take panoramic pictures of the surface plus a visible-light microscope and an infrared spectrometer. The panoramic cameras (CIVA-P) are arranged on the sides of the lander at 60° intervals: five mono imagers and two others making up a stereo imager. Each camera has a 1024×1024 pixel CCD detector. The microscope and spectrometer (CIVA-M) are mounted on the base of the lander, and are used to analyse the composition, texture and albedo (reflectivity) of samples collected from the surface.

CONSERT
The Comet Nucleus Sounding Experiment by Radiowave Transmission used electromagnetic wave propagation to determine the comet's internal structure. A radar on Rosetta transmitted a signal through the nucleus to be received by a detector on Philae.

COSAC
The Cometary Sampling and Composition instrument is a combined gas chromatograph and time-of-flight mass spectrometer to perform analysis of soil samples and determine the content of volatile components.

MUPUS
The Multi-Purpose Sensors for Surface and Sub-Surface Science instrument measured the density, thermal and mechanical properties of the comet's surface.

Ptolemy
An instrument measuring stable isotope ratios of key volatiles on the comet's nucleus. Parts of the instrument were manufactured by the Special Techniques Group at UKAEA.

ROLIS
The Rosetta Lander Imaging System is a CCD camera used to obtain high-resolution images during descent and stereo panoramic images of areas sampled by other instruments. The CCD detector consists of 1024×1024 pixels.

ROMAP
The Rosetta Lander Magnetometer and Plasma Monitor is a magnetometer and plasma sensor to study the nucleus's magnetic field and its interactions with the solar wind.

SD2
The Sampling, Drilling and Distribution system obtains soil samples from the comet and transfers them to the Ptolemy, COSAC, and CIVA instruments for in-situ analysis. SD2 contains four primary subsystems: drill, ovens, carousel, and volume checker. The drill system, made of steel and titanium, is capable of drilling to a depth of 230 mm (9.1 in), deploying a probe to collect samples, and delivering samples to the ovens. There are a total of 26 platinum ovens to heat samples—10 medium temperature ovens at 180 °C (356 °F) and 16 high temperature ovens at 800 °C (1,470 °F)—and one oven to clear the drill bit for reuse. The ovens are mounted on a rotating carousel that delivers the active oven to the appropriate instrument. The electromechanical volume checker determines how much material was deposited into an oven, and may be used to evenly distribute material on CIVA's optical windows. Development of SD2 was led by the Italian Space Agency with contributions by prime contractor Tecnospazio S.p.A. (now Selex ES S.p.A.) in charge of the system design and overall integration; the Italian company Tecnomare S.p.A., owned by Eni S.p.A., in charge of the design, development, and testing of the drilling/sampling tool and the volume checker; Media Lario; and Dallara. The instrument's principal investigator is Amalia Ercoli-Finzi (Politecnico di Milano).

SESAME
The Surface Electric Sounding and Acoustic Monitoring Experiments used three instruments to measure properties of the comet's outer layers. The Cometary Acoustic Sounding Surface Experiment (CASSE) measures the way in which sound travels through the surface. The Permittivity Probe (PP) investigates its electrical characteristics, and the Dust Impact Monitor (DIM) measures dust falling back to the surface.

== Analysis of comet ==
On 28 October 2020, it was reported that Philae had discovered, among other things, "low-strength primitive ice inside cometary boulders." This also included primitive water ice from the comet's estimated formation 4.5 billion years prior. This occurred primarily at the site of Philae's second touchdown onto the 67P/Churyumov–Gerasimenko, where the spacecraft successfully produced four distinct surface contacts on two adjoining cometary boulders. Philae was also able to drill 25 centimetres (9.8 in) into the comet's boulder ice.

== International contributions ==
Austria
The Austrian Space Research Institute developed the lander's anchor and two sensors within MUPUS, which are integrated into the anchor tips.

Belgium
The Belgian Institute for Space Aeronomy (BIRA) cooperated with different partners to build one of the sensors (DFMS) of the Rosetta Orbiter Spectrometer for Ion and Neutral Analysis (ROSINA) instrument. The Belgian Institute for Space Aeronomy (BIRA) and Royal Observatory of Belgium (ROB) provided information about the space weather conditions at Rosetta to support the landing of Philae. The main concern was solar proton events.

Canada
Two Canadian companies played a role in the mission. SED Systems, located on the University of Saskatchewan campus in Saskatoon, built three ground stations that were used to communicate with the Rosetta spacecraft. ADGA-RHEA Group of Ottawa provided MOIS (Manufacturing and Operating Information Systems) software which supported the procedures and command sequences operations software.

Finland
The Finnish Meteorological Institute provided the memory of the Command, Data and Management System (CDMS) and the Permittivity Probe (PP).

France
The French Space Agency, in collaboration with various French scientific institutes (IAS, SA, LPG, LISA), provided the system's overall engineering, radiocommunications, battery assembly, CONSERT, CIVA and the ground segment (overall engineering and development/operation of the Scientific Operation & Navigation Centre).

Germany
The German Space Agency (DLR) has provided the structure, thermal subsystem, flywheel, the Active Descent System (procured by DLR but made in Switzerland), ROLIS, downward-looking camera, SESAME, acoustic sounding and seismic instrument for Philae. It has also managed the project and did the level product assurance. The University of Münster built MUPUS (it was designed and built in Space Research Centre of Polish Academy of Sciences) and the Braunschweig University of Technology the ROMAP instrument. The Max Planck Institute for Solar System Research made the payload engineering, eject mechanism, landing gear, anchoring harpoon, central computer, COSAC, APXS and other subsystems. The institute has led development and construction of COSAC and DIM, a part of SESAME, as well as contributed to the deveplopment and construction of ROMAP.

Hungary
The Command and Data Management Subsystem (CDMS) designed in the Wigner Research Centre for Physics of the Hungarian Academy of Sciences jointly with the Space and Ground Facilities Ltd. (a spin-off company of the Wigner Research Centre for Physics). The Power Subsystem (PSS) designed in the Department of Broadband Infocommunications and Electromagnetic Theory at Budapest University of Technology and Economics. CDMS is the fault tolerant central computer of the lander, while PSS assures that the power coming from the batteries and solar arrays are properly handled, controls battery charging and manages the onboard power distribution.

Ireland
Captec Ltd., based in Malahide, provided the independent validation of mission critical software (independent software validation facility or SVF) and developed the software for the communications interface between the orbiter and the lander. Captec also provided engineering support to the prime contractor for the launch activities at Kourou. Space Technology Ireland Ltd. at Maynooth University has designed, constructed and tested the Electrical Support System Processor Unit (ESS) for the Rosetta mission. ESS stores, transmits and provides decoding for the command streams passing from the spacecraft to the lander and handles the data streams coming back from the scientific experiments on the lander to the spacecraft.

Italy
The Italian Space Agency (ASI) developed the SD2 instrument and the photovoltaic assembly. Italian Alenia Space was involved in the assembly, integration and testing of the probe, as well as several mechanical and electrical ground support equipment. The company also built the probe's S-band and X-band digital transponder, used for communications with Earth.

Netherlands
Moog Bradford (Heerle, The Netherlands) provided the Active Descent System, which guided and propelled the lander down to its landing zone. To accomplish the ADS, a strategic industrial team was formed with Bleuler-Baumer Mechanik in Switzerland.

Poland
The Space Research Centre of the Polish Academy of Sciences built the Multi-Purpose Sensors for Surface and Subsurface Science (MUPUS).

Spain
The GMV Spanish division has been responsible for the maintenance of the calculation tools to calculate the criteria of lighting and visibility necessary to decide the point of landing on the comet, as well as the possible trajectories of decline of the Philae module. Other important Spanish companies or educational institutions that have been contributed are as follows: INTA, Airbus Defence and Space Spanish division, other small companies also participated in subcontracted packages in structural mechanics and thermal control like AASpace (former Space Contact), and the Universidad Politécnica de Madrid.

Switzerland
The Swiss Centre for Electronics and Microtechnology developed CIVA.

United Kingdom
The Open University and the Rutherford Appleton Laboratory (RAL) developed PTOLEMY. RAL also constructed the blankets that kept the lander warm throughout its mission. Surrey Satellites Technology Ltd. (SSTL) constructed the momentum wheel for the lander. It stabilised the module during the descent and landing phases. Manufacturer e2v supplied the CIVA and Rolis camera systems used to film the descent and take images of samples, as well as three other camera systems.

== Media coverage ==
The landing was featured heavily in social media, with the lander having an official Twitter account portraying a personification of the spacecraft. The hashtag "#CometLanding" gained widespread traction. A Livestream of the control centres was set up, as were multiple official and unofficial events around the world to follow Philae's landing on Churyumov–Gerasimenko. Various instruments on Philae were given their own Twitter accounts to announce news and science results.

=== Popular culture ===
Vangelis composed the music for the trio of music videos released by ESA to celebrate the first-ever attempted soft landing on a comet by ESA's Rosetta mission.

On 12 November 2014, the search engine Google featured a Google Doodle of Philae on its home page. On 31 December 2014, Google featured Philae again as part of its New Year's Eve 2014 Doodle.

Online comic author Randall Munroe wrote a live updating strip on his website xkcd on the day of the landing.

== See also ==
- Hayabusa
- MASCOT, DLR-CNES mini asteroid lander
- MINERVA
- NEAR Shoemaker
- OSIRIS-REx
- Timeline of Rosetta spacecraft
