= CONSERT =

Scientific experiment on board the Rosetta mission

CONSERT (COmet Nucleus Sounding Experiment by Radiowave Transmission) is a scientific experiment on board the European Space Agency's Rosetta mission, launched in 2004, to provide information about the deep interior of the comet 67P/Churyumov-Gerasimenko upon the probe's rendezvous with the comet in 2014.

The CONSERT radar was to perform tomography of the nucleus by measuring electromagnetic wave propagation from the Philae lander and the Rosetta orbiter throughout the comet nucleus in order to determine its internal structures and to deduce information on its composition. The related lander and orbiter electronics were provided by France and both antennas were constructed in Germany. The experiment was designed and built in France by Laboratoire de Planétologie de Grenoble (LPG now IPAG) and by Service d'Aéronomie in Paris (SA now LATMOS), in Germany by the Max Planck Institute for Solar System Research (MPS) in Göttingen. The Principal Investigator of CONSERT is Dr. Wlodek Kofman (IPAG), Director of Research at CNRS.

On 13 November 2014, the experiment unexpectedly provided information to locate Philae after it had bounced into an unknown place.

== Scientific objectives ==
The scientific objectives of the CONSERT experiment are the determination of the main dielectric properties and, through modelling, to set constraints on the cometary composition (materials, porosity, etc.), to detect large–size structures (several tens of meters) and stratification, to detect and characterise small–scale irregularities within the nucleus.

A detailed analysis of the radio–waves which have passed through all or parts of the nucleus will put real constraints on the materials and on inhomogeneities and will help to identify blocks, gaps or voids. From this information, scientists will attempt to answer some fundamental questions of cometary physics. How is the nucleus built up? Is it homogeneous, layered or composed of accreted blocks (cometesimals, boulders)? What is the nature of the refractory component? Is it chondritic as generally expected or does it contain inclusions of unexpected electromagnetic properties?

In more detail, the purpose of CONSERT experiment is to measure the following quantities:

- The mean permittivity of the comet nucleus is derived from the group delay of the main path introduced when the comet is inserted into the propagation path. The permittivity enables to identify the electrical properties of the material found in the comet nucleus.
- The mean absorption of the comet nucleus is derived from the radiowave path loss as the signal propagates through the comet nucleus. The absorption identifies the class of materials found in the comet nucleus.
- The structure of the received signal, the number of different paths and their variation with the propagation path are related to the size of the cometesimals and to the reflection coefficient at internal interfaces.
- The correlation length of the measured signal as a function of the orbit position is related to the size of the irregularities or small structures inside the comet.
- The volume scattering coefficient is derived from the nature of the observed signal. The volume scattering coefficient measures the homogeneity of the interior of the comet nucleus.

== Basic principle of the CONSERT experiment ==
The basic principle of the experiment was to use the electromagnetic propagation (90 MHz VHF radio) through the cometary interior. An electromagnetic wave–front propagates through the cometary nucleus at a smaller velocity than in free space, and loses energy in the process. Both the change in velocity and the energy loss depend on the complex permittivity of the cometary materials. They also depend on the ratio of the wavelength used to the size of any inhomogeneities present. Thus, any signal that has propagated through the medium contains information concerning this medium. The change in velocity of the electromagnetic wave induced by propagation through the cometary material is calculable from the time taken by the wave to travel between the orbiter and the lander, while the loss of energy is deducible from the change in signal amplitude.

The orbiter sent a signal to be picked up by the lander. As the orbiter moved along its orbit, the path between it and the lander varied and so passed through differing parts of the comet. The rotation of the comet nucleus also changed the relative position of the lander and the orbiter. Hence, over several orbits, many different paths were to be obtained.

The lander communicated with the Rosetta orbiter again on 9 July 2015 and transmitted measurement data from the CONSERT instrument.
