= Mission Science Division =

European Space Agency logo

The Earth and Mission Science Division is a group of European Space Agency (ESA) staff mission scientists, contractors, research fellows, young graduates, trainees, and administrative staff working within the Climate Action, Sustainability and Science Department of the Directorate of Earth Observation Programmes. The Division is located at ESA's European Space Research and Technology Centre in Noordwijk, South Holland, The Netherlands.

== Introduction ==
The Earth and Mission Science Division (MSD) supports the preparation, development and operations of research and operational missions within the Earth Observation Programmes Directorate of ESA. The Division is responsible for ensuring the application of scientific and other user community requirements in all phases of the development of Earth Observation missions, from precursor studies through to in-orbit satellite operations, and for ensuring coherence throughout with the objectives expressed in the mission requirements documents, including the management of mission-, instrument-specific, or ad-hoc advisory structures (as required). The Division organises the activities of the Advisory Committee for Earth Observation (ACEO), and manages and implements of the scientific selection procedure for ESA research missions.

In support of the preparation of new mission concepts, or development and operations of each ESA approved Earth Observation mission, the Division conceives, initiates and conducts supporting scientific studies (in house and external) to ensure that the mission is "fit for purpose". In addition, the Division organises, coordinates and executes Campaigns for the purpose of acquiring airborne, balloon-borne, or in-situ data. Campaigns are specifically designed in support of technology or mission concept development, mission development, data simulation, and instrument calibration or product validation purposes. Campaign data are distributed publicly.

== History and Background ==
The Division was founded in November 1992 and has fulfilled a consistent role and function throughout the evolution and development of Earth Observation capabilities within the European Space Agency (ESA). The original Earth Science Division (ESD) was established in the Space Science Department of ESA's Scientific Programme Directorate. Through the initiation of the ESA Living Planet Programme in 1998, the Division provided crucial scientific support to the development of the successful Meteosat, ERS, Envisat and MetOp missions, together with organising the milestone Granada User Consultation Meetings - which established the lineage of user-driven Earth Explorer research missions through regular consultations with the Earth science user community, and Earth Watch operational missions in conjunction with the operational user community.

Throughout its history, the Division has moved and been rebranded during various ESA organisational changes. In 2001 the Earth Sciences Division moved into the Earth Observation Future Programmes Department of the new Applications Directorate (D/APP). Shortly after, in 2002, the Applications Directorate was split up with ESD and the Future Programmes Department moved into the new Earth Observation Programmes Directorate (D/EOP). In 2003, the Division was rebranded as the Mission Experts Division and moved together with the Future Programmes Department into the Science and Applications Department. In 2004 the Division was renamed back to Earth Science Division and moved into the Science, Applications and Future Technologies Department. In 2007 the Division was reorganised and renamed the Mission Science Division. Most recently in 2018 the Division became the Earth and Mission Science Division within the Climate Action, Sustainability and Science Department of the Earth Observation Programmes Directorate.

European Space Research and Technology Centre
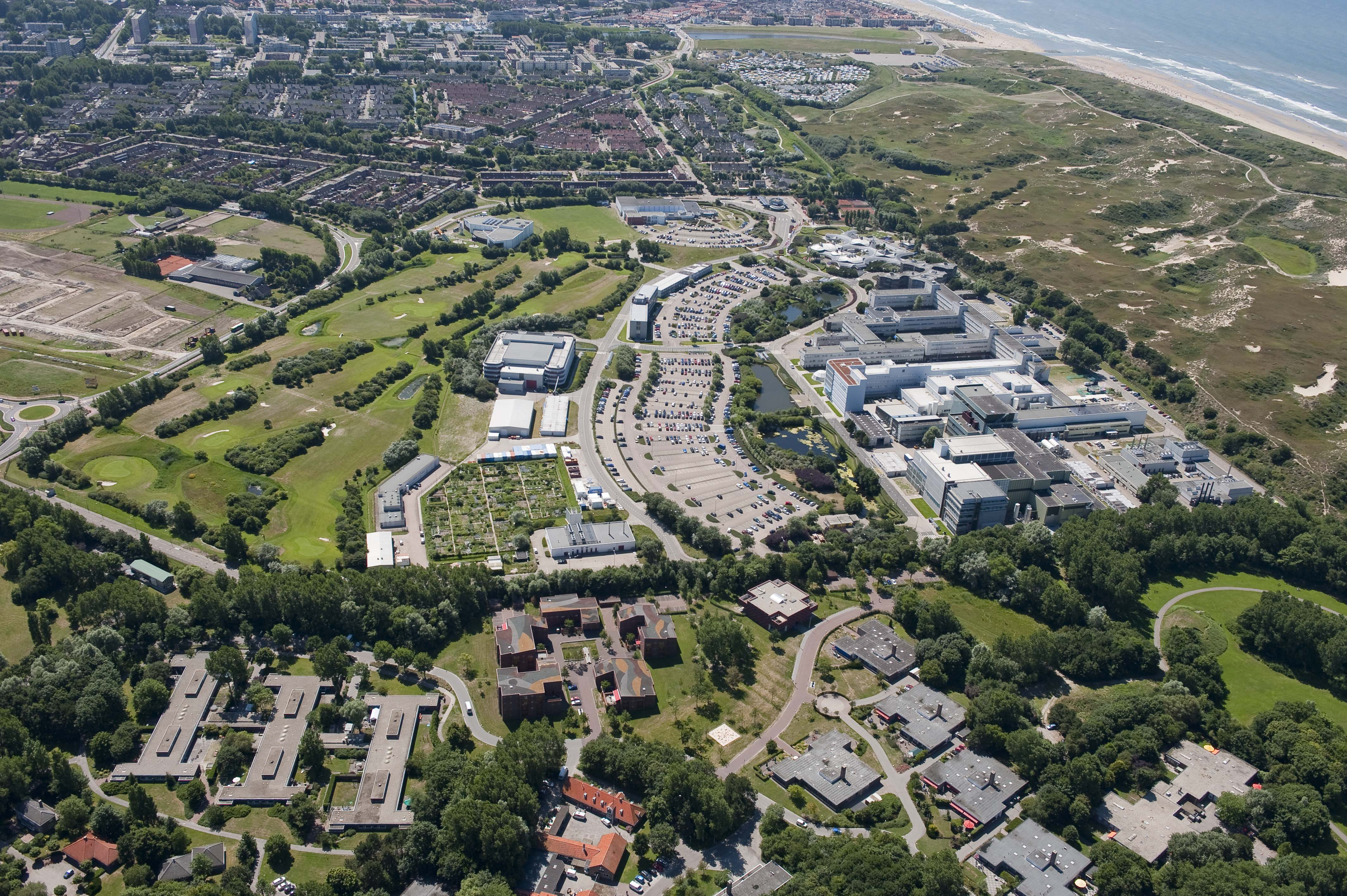
- Aerial view of ESA's Technical Centre ESTEC in Noordwijk, Netherlands
- Abbreviation: ESTEC
- Type: Intragovernmental organisation
- Purpose: Science and Technology
- Location: Noordwijk, Netherlands
- Parent organization: European Space Agency
- Website: www.esa.int/SPECIALS/ESTEC/index.html

== Division Management ==
The current Mission Science Division management team comprises:

- Dr. Thorsten Fehr (Head of Earth and Mission Science Division)
- Dr. Cristian Rossi (Head of Earth Surfaces and Interior Section)
- Dr. Malcolm Davidson (Head of Campaigns Section)
- Dr. Ben Veihelmann (Acting Head of Atmospheric Section).

Former Heads of Division:

- Chris J. Readings (1992 - 2001)
- Einar-Arne Herland (2001 - 2007)
- Mark R. Drinkwater (2007 - 2025)

== Research Missions ==
ESA's Earth Observation research missions comprise Earth Explorers, Missions of Opportunity, and Scout missions. The Earth and Mission Science Division has published several Calls for Proposals of Mission Ideas, and prepared and contributed to the approval of ten science-driven ESA Earth Explorers , with three candidates selected from proposals to the 2017 Call for core Earth Explorer mission ideas; and four candidates selected from the 2020 Call for Earth Explorer research mission ideas, namely:

=== Earth Explorer Core missions ===
- GOCE (launched successfully on 17 March 2009; successfully completed its mission on 11 November 2013).
- Aeolus (launched successfully on 22 August 2018 ; successfully completed its mission on 28 July 2023)
- EarthCARE
- Biomass (satellite)
- Harmony

The Call for proposals for Earth Explorer 10 (EE10) core mission ideas was released in September 2017. Three candidate mission ideas: Daedalus, Harmony and Hydroterra (formerly STEREOID:(Stereo Thermo-Optically Enhanced Radar for Earth, Ocean, Ice, and land Dynamics ) were selected for Phase 0 pre-feasibility study in September 2018. After completion of Phase 0 in February 2021, Harmony was selected to proceed to Phase A feasibility study. Upon successful conclusion of the feasibility study and presentation of the Harmony mission at ESA-ESTEC on 5 July 2022 at a User Consultation Meeting, Harmony was ultimately selected as Earth Explorer 10 in September 2022.

A Call for proposals for Earth Explorer 11 (EE-11) mission ideas was released on 25 May 2020. The Call closed in December 2020, with 15 proposals submitted via the EO Proposals Submission (EOPRO) Website | https://eopro.esa.int. Upon peer review of all proposals, the following four candidate ideas were selected for Phase 0 pre-feasibility study in June 2021:

- CAIRT (Changing-Atmosphere InfraRed Tomography)
- Nitrosat
- Seastar
- WIVERN (WInd VElocity Radar Nephoscope).

On 10–11 October 2023 the Earth Explorer 11 User Consultation Meeting was held in Bucharest, Romania, after which two of the candidates, CAIRT and WIVERN, were selected in November 2023 by ESA Member States to proceed to Phase A.

A Call for proposals for Earth Explorer 12 (EE12) mission ideas is currently open (https://eopro.esa.int). Seventeen proposed mission ideas were received by the deadline of 29 September 2023 and evaluated by independent scientific peer reviewers, and ESA technical and programmatic review panels. Four EE12 candidates were selected for Phase 0 pre-feasibility study in April 2024:

- CryoRad
- ECO
- Hydroterra+
- Keystone

=== Earth Explorer Opportunity missions ===
- CryoSat-2 (launched successfully on 8 April 2010)
- SMOS (launched successfully on 2 November 2009)
- Swarm (launched successfully on 22 November 2013)
- FLEX -Fluorescence Explorer (*selected in November 2015).

=== Earth Explorer Fast Track missions ===
- FORUM (*selected in September 2019) .

=== Missions of Opportunity ===
- The SAOCOM Companion Satellite (SAOCOM-CS) formation flying mission was a candidate Mission of Opportunity which was studied at Phase A in 2014–16 in response to an opportunity from the Argentinian Space Agency (Comisión Nacional de Actividades Espaciales Argentina - CONAE) to design, develop and launch a companion satellite with "passive" radar working in tandem with the SAOCOM-1B L-band radar mission. The primary objective of SAOCOM-CS was to exploit bi-static modes for land applications, and to perform forest tomography exploiting small baselines between active and passive systems (of order of km) changing with time. SAOCOM-CS did not proceed to implementation.
- The Next Generation Gravity Mission (NGGM) is a candidate Mission of Opportunity studied in the frame of the ESA–NASA Mass Change and Geosciences International Constellation (MAGIC). The mission aims at enabling long-term monitoring of the temporal variations of Earth's gravity field at relatively high temporal (down to 3 days) and increased spatial resolutions (up to 100 km) at longer time intervals. The NGGM mission concept, based on European technical developments for the CHAMP, GOCE, GRACE and GRACE-FO missions would deliver continuity and a sustained satellite gravimetry dataset relevant for climate applications.

== Operational Missions ==
The Division currently supports the development of six series of approved Copernicus Programme Sentinel Missions, six Copernicus Expansion missions, and four Copernicus Next Generation missions as part of the Space Component of the joint EC/ESA Copernicus initiative. It has supported the development of MetOp, and is currently active in supporting the preparation of MetOp Second Generation (MetOp-SG). Recently, the TRUTHS mission was approved for preparatory phase activities as a potential Earth Watch mission.

=== Copernicus Space Component missions ===
- Sentinel 1 – (Sentinel-1A launched successfully on 3 April 2014 and Sentinel-1B on 25 April 2016)
- Sentinel 2 – (Sentinel-2A launched successfully on 23 June 2015 and Sentinel-2B on 7 March 2017)
- Sentinel 3 – (Sentinel-3A launched successfully on 16 February 2016 and Sentinel-3B launch scheduled in April 2018)
- Sentinel 4 (on Meteosat Third Generation-S)
- Sentinel-5 Precursor - (launched successfully on 13 October 2017)
- Sentinel 5 (on MetOp-Second Generation- Metop-SG)
- Sentinel 6 – (also known as Jason Continuity of Service – Jason-CS).

In preparation for the second-generation of Copernicus (Copernicus2.0), six Sentinel "Expansion" missions are being developed by ESA to address EU Policy and gaps in user needs, and to increase the current capabilities of the Copernicus Space Component:

- CO2M – Anthropogenic CO_{2} emissions Monitoring mission
- LSTM – High spatio-temporal resolution Land Surface Temperature Mission
- CRISTAL – Copernicus PolaR Ice and Snow Topography Altimeter mission
- CHIME – Copernicus Hyperspectral Imaging Mission for the Environment
- CIMR – polar Imaging Microwave Radiometer mission
- ROSE-L – Radar Observing System for Europe - L-band SAR mission.

In preparation for Copernicus2.0, design concepts for four next generation Sentinels (Sentinel-NG) are being prepared by ESA within its FutureEO Programme, to deliver enhanced continuity to the first generation Sentinel satellites:

- Sentinel 1 NG
- Sentinel 2 NG
- Sentinel 3 NG Topography
- Sentinel 3 NG Optical/IR.

=== Meteorological Satellite Series ===
The Division also presently supports the development of several instruments out of the 10 instrument payload of the approved series of second generation MetOp satellites. The MetOp-SG series is developed in cooperation with EUMETSAT, as part of the EUMETSAT Polar System – Second Generation initiative. EPS-SG represents Europe's contribution to the future Joint Polar System (JPS).

- MWS (MicroWave Sounder), to provide atmospheric temperature and humidity profiles
- SCA (Scatterometer), to provide ocean surface wind vectors and land surface soil moisture
- RO (Radio Occultation sounder), to provide atmospheric temperature and humidity profiles, as well as information about the ionosphere
- MWI (MicroWave Imager), to provide precipitation monitoring as well as sea ice extent information
- ICI (Ice and Cloud Imager), to measure cloud ice water path, properties and altitude
- 3MI (Multi-viewing, Multi-channel, Multi-polarisation Imager), to provide information on atmospheric aerosols
- UVNS/S5 (Ultra-Violet /Visible/Near Infrared/Short Wave Infrared spectrometer -Sentinel-5) instrument, to monitor various trace gases, air quality and support climate monitoring.

=== Earth Watch ===
The Division is currently supporting the feasibility phase of the following potential future mission:

- TRUTHS (Traceable Radiometry Underpinning Terrestrial- and Helio- Studies) mission proposed by the UK, to establish an SI-traceable space-based climate and calibration observing system to improve confidence in climate-change forecasts – a kind of 'standards laboratory in space'.
