= FutureEO =

ESA space programme

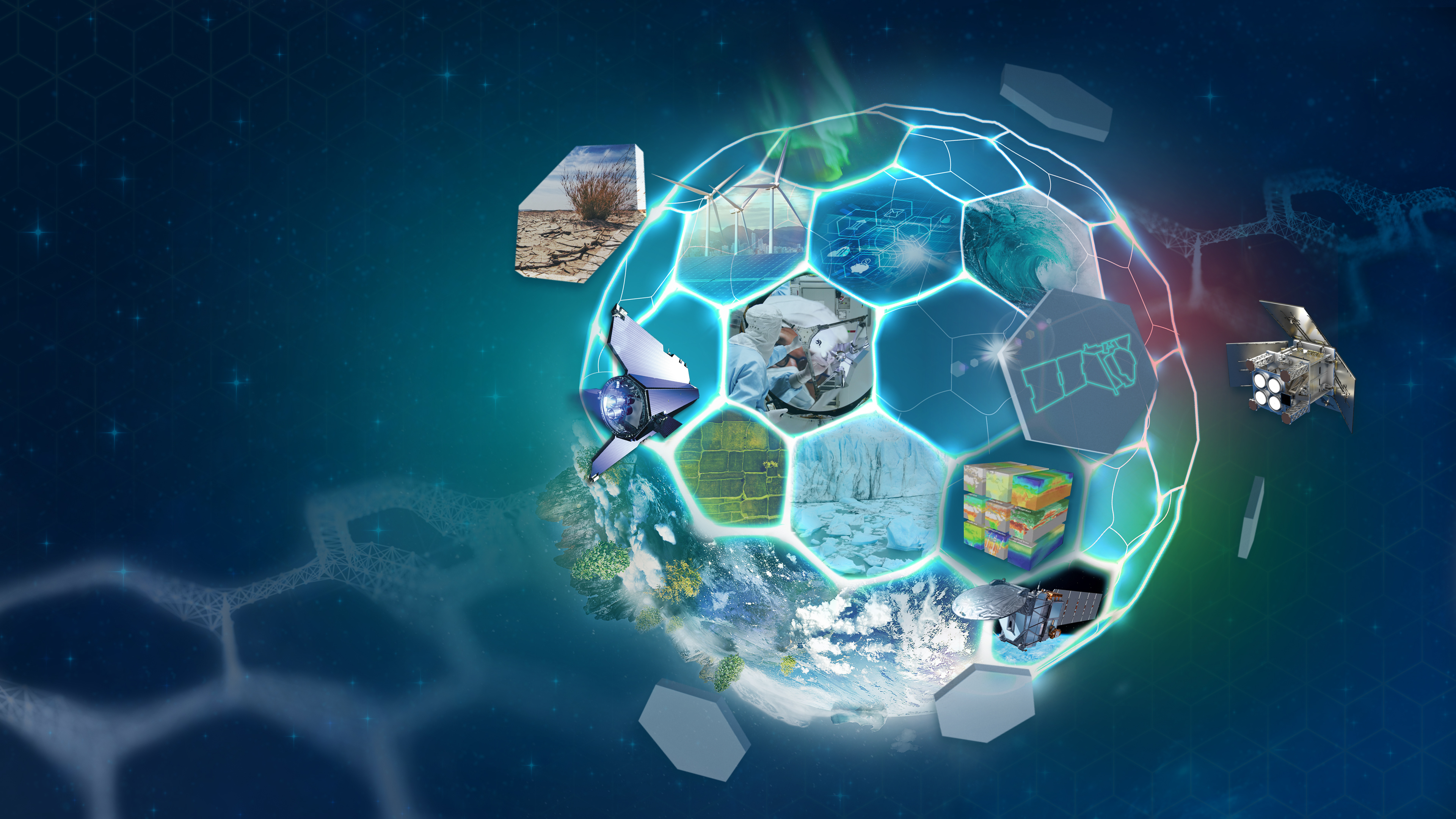
ESA's FutureEO programme visualization (2021)

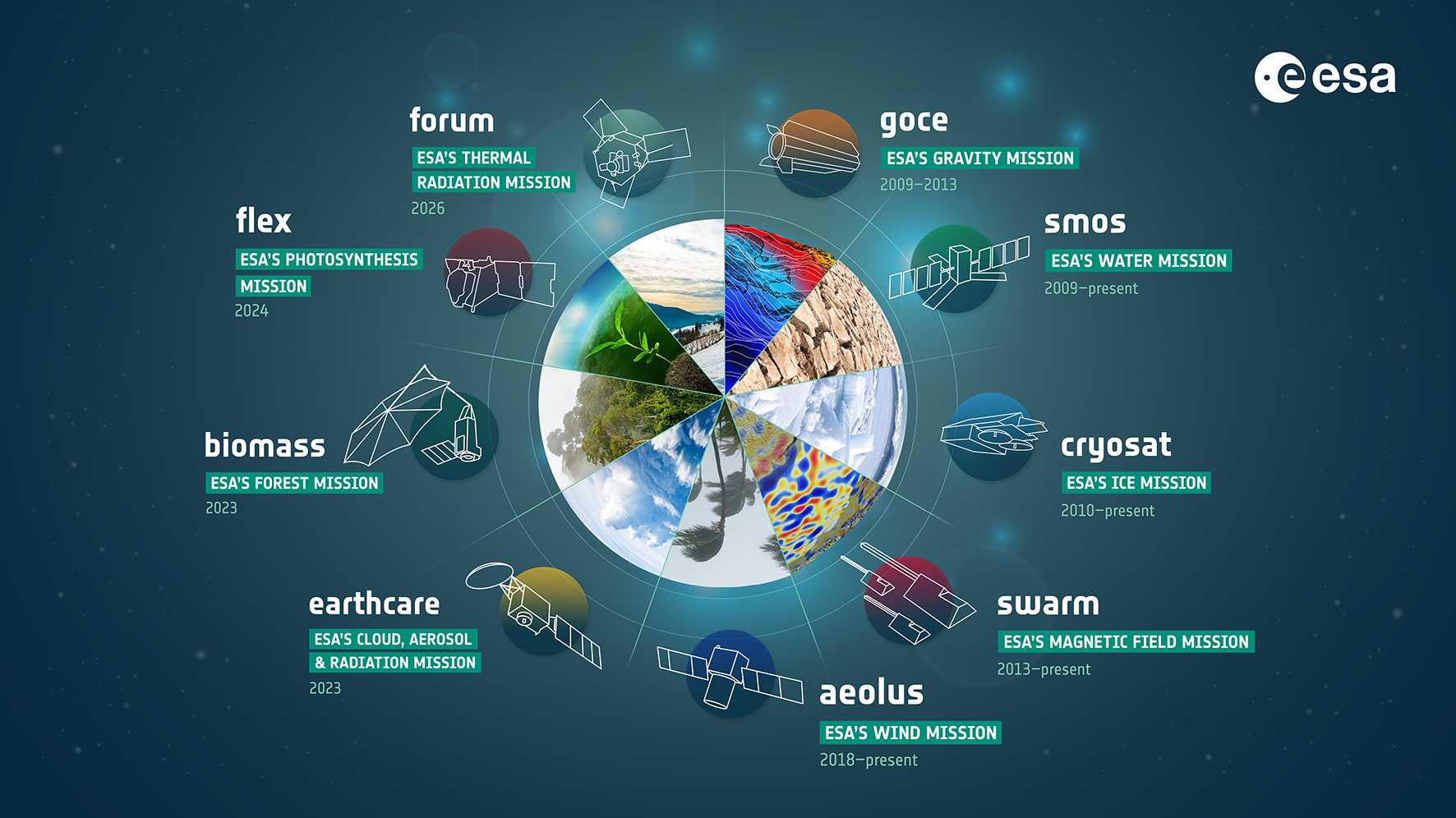
ESA's Earth Explorer missions (2022)

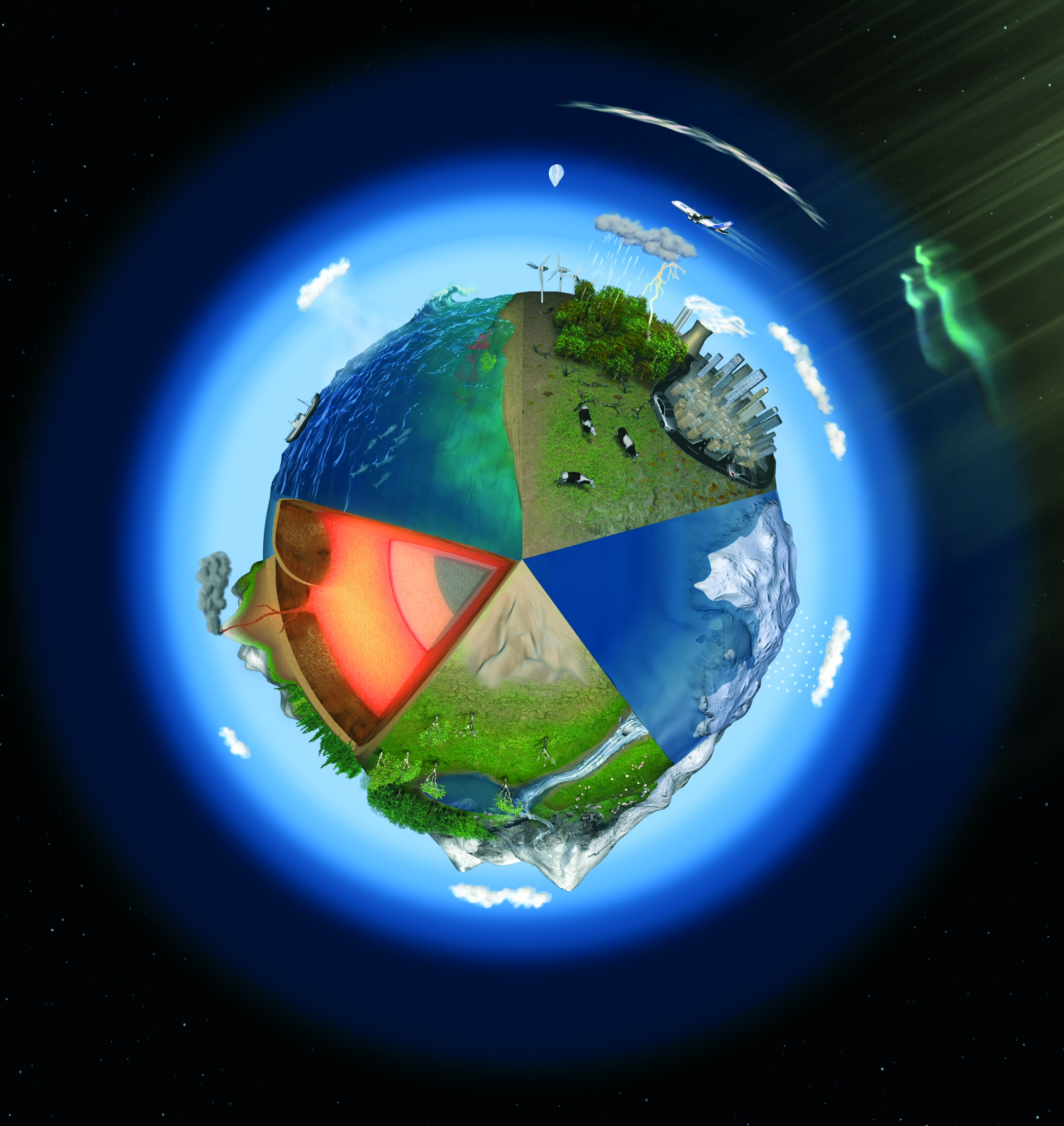
ESA's Living Planet programme visualization (2013)

FutureEO (formerly Living Planet Programme) is a Programme of the European Space Agency (ESA) managed by the Earth Observation Programmes Directorate. FutureEO supports preparation and development of series of Earth observation satellite missions including the established Earth Explorers, the smaller agile Scout missions, as well as CubeSat-type Φ-sats.

== Earth Explorer missions ==
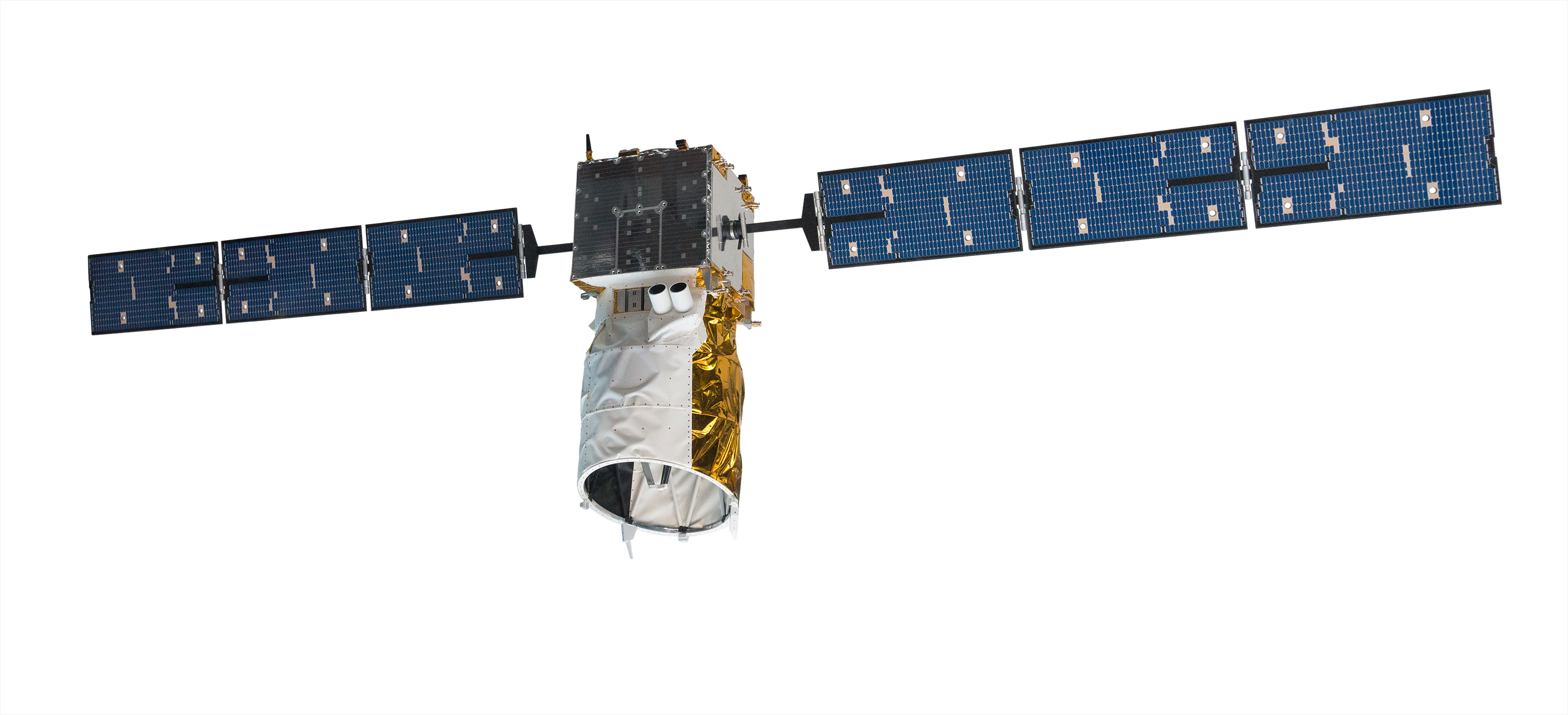
ADM-Aeolus model

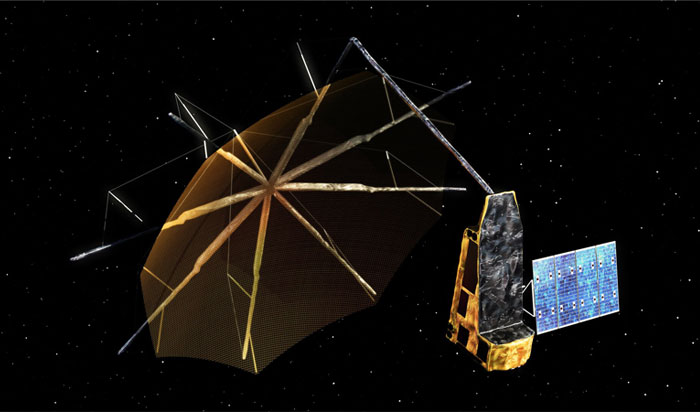
Artist's impression of the Biomass satellite

The Earth Explorer missions of the European Space Agency are innovative Earth-Observation scientific missions; so far, 11 Earth Explorers have been selected. The selection process involves a competition between various scientific concepts: 4 mission concepts are typically considered in Phase-0, and only one of them is selected at the end of Phase-A.

=== Launched ===
- GOCE – Gravity Field and Steady-State Ocean Circulation Explorer; it was launched on 17 March 2009. It reentered the atmosphere on 11 November 2013.
- SMOS – the Soil Moisture and Ocean Salinity satellite studies ocean salinity and soil moisture; it was launched on 2 November 2009.
- CryoSat – a program designed to map the Earth's ice cover.
  - CryoSat-1 was lost in 2005 when the Russian Rokot launch vehicle malfunctioned and was terminated.
  - CryoSat-2 was launched on 8 April 2010.
- Swarm – a trio of satellites to map the Earth's magnetic field. The SWARM constellation was launched successfully on 22 November 2013.
- Aeolus – the Atmospheric Dynamics Mission Aeolus used an innovative laser to measure global winds. Aeolus was successfully launched on 22 August 2018 and deorbited and re-entered the atmosphere over Antarctica on 28 July 2023. Following the success of Aeolus as an Earth Explorer, Aeolus-2 is a cooperation involving ESA and EUMETSAT which will provide two operational satellites in mid-2030s.
- EarthCARE – the Earth Clouds Aerosols and Radiation Explorer studies the interplay between aerosols, clouds, and radiation thanks to a suite of complementary on-board instruments. The mission delivers a large number of products and has been considered by ESA as the most complex Earth Explorer to date. Launched on 28 May 2024.
- BIOMASS – designed to calculate the amount of carbon stored in the world's forests, and to monitor for any changes over the course of its five-year mission. Launched on 29 April 2025.
- FLEX – the FLuorescence EXplorer mission globally monitors steady-state chlorophyll fluorescence in terrestrial vegetation. Launched on 15 September 2026.

=== Selected ===
- FORUM – Far-infrared Outgoing Radiation Understanding and Monitoring; a mission to measure Earth's outgoing radiation emissions across the entire far-infrared electromagnetic spectrum, in order to gain insight into water vapour and cirrus cloud regulation of the planet's surface temperature. It is currently projected to launch in 2027.
- Harmony (formerly known as Stereoid) – a pair of synthetic aperture radar satellites that aims to further the study of ocean circulation patterns, glacial dynamics, and changes in land-surface topography. It is currently projected to launch in 2029.
- WIVERN (Wind Velocity Radar Nephoscope) – a mission to measure cloud wind velocity, rain, snow, and ice water via a Doppler weather radar nephoscope, in order to improve weather forecast models. Selected as the 11th Earth Explorer mission in September 2025.

=== Non-selected ===
Past candidate missions that were not selected include:

- CoReH2O – a mission to study key characteristics in terrestrial snow, ice, and water cycles and their relations to climate change and variability. Competed with BIOMASS and PREMIER for the Earth Explorer 7 mission opportunity.
- PREMIER – a mission to study atmospheric processes related to trace gas, radiation, and chemical compositions in the mid to upper troposphere and lower stratosphere in order to understand their role on climate change. Competed with BIOMASS and CoReH2O for the Earth Explorer 7 mission opportunity.
- CarbonSat – a mission to determine the global distributions of carbon dioxide and methane and their impact on climate change. Competed with FLEX for the Earth Explorer 8 mission opportunity.
- SKIM – a mission to measure ocean-surface currents using the Doppler technique, in order to improve understanding of the ocean current dynamics behind the hydrological and geochemical cycles. Competed with FORUM for the Earth Explorer 9 mission opportunity.
- Daedalus – a mission to study the electrodynamic processes of the Earth's thermosphere and ionosphere. Competed with Harmony for the Earth Explorer 10 mission opportunity.
- Hydroterra (formerly known as G-Class) – a geosynchronous synthetic aperture radar satellite that aims to observe diurnal water cycle processes, in order to improve weather prediction capabilities. Competed with Harmony for the Earth Explorer 10 mission opportunity.
- Cairt (Changing-Atmosphere Infra-Red Tomography Explorer) – a mission to observe atmospheric chemistry and dynamics in the altitude range of 5 to 120 km, in order to better understand the relationship between climate change and atmospheric circulation. Competed with Wivern for the Earth Explorer 11 mission opportunity.
- Nitrosat – a mission to precisely measure nitrogen dioxide and ammonia levels in the atmosphere, which is essential to understanding the role of nitrogen compounds in aerosol pollution. Competed with Wivern for the Earth Explorer 11 mission opportunity.
- Seastar – a mission to study sub-mesoscale meteorological dynamics by providing 1 km resolution ocean surface current and wind vectors for coast, shelf, and polar ice zones. Competed with Wivern for the Earth Explorer 11 mission opportunity.

=== Earth Explorer 12 candidates ===
From the 17 submissions, ESA’s Advisory Committee for Earth Observation (ACEO) recommended that four of the ideas should go forward to the assessment study phase:

- CryoRad proposes to measure low frequency passive microwave radiometry of the cryosphere.
- ECO would directly measure the difference between incoming solar radiation and outgoing radiation of the planet.
- Hydroterra+ is a geostationary satellite mission to provide high temporal rate SAR imagery to understand rapid water cycle and tectonic events.
- Keystone would measure atomic oxygen in 50–100 km of the atmosphere.

On 25 September 2026, ESA's Programme Board for Earth Observation selected ECO, Keystone, and CryoRad to progress to the next preparatory phase.

== Missions of Opportunity ==
- Next Generation Gravity Mission (NGGM) – a proposed mission to map Earth's gravity field, projected to launch in 2032

== Scout missions ==
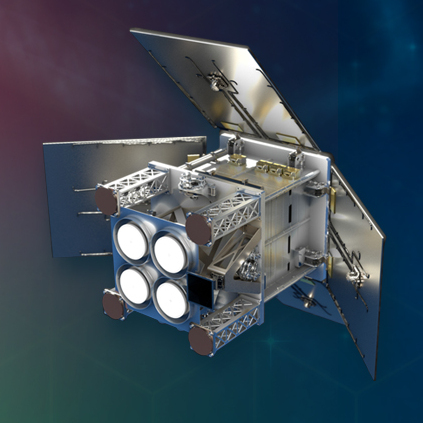
Illustration of the HydroGNSS satellite

=== Launched Scout missions ===
- HydroGNSS (Scout 2) – two identical satellites sensing Galileo and GPS signals reflected by Earth's surface for improving the knowledge of Earth's hydrological cycle; launched in late 2025

=== Selected Scout missions ===
- NanoMagSat (Scout 3) – measuring the ionospheric environment, monitoring Earth's magnetic field; launching in late 2027
- Tango (Scout 4) – monitoring three greenhouse gases: methane, carbon dioxide, and nitrogen dioxide being emitted from large industrial sites
- Hibidis – hyperspectral imaging for understanding biodiversity and ecosystem functions
- SOVA-S – investigating atmospheric gravity waves

=== Non-selected Scout missions ===
- NAIAD, proposed – study of coastal and inland aquatic ecosystems
- SIRIUS, proposed – thermal infrared imaging of European cities to study urban heat islands

=== Cancelled Scout missions ===
- CubeMAP (Scout 1), cancelled – quantifying processes in the upper-atmosphere

== Φ-sat missions ==
- Phi-Sat-1, launched in 2020
- Phi-Sat-2, launched in 2024

== See also ==
- Mission Science Division
- List of European Space Agency programmes and missions
- List of Earth observation satellites
- Advisory Committee for Earth Observation
