= SOVA-S =

European atmospheric science satellite

- Mission type: Atmospheric science
- Operator: European Space Agency
- Website: www.ohb-czech.cz/our-projects/sova-s

Spacecraft properties
- Manufacturer: (Czech Republic) OHB Czechspace
- Launch mass: 180 kg (estimated)

Start of mission
- Launch date: 2030 (planned)

SOVA-S (Satellite Observation of Waves in the Atmosphere – Scout) is a future European atmospheric science satellite under development by the European Space Agency's FutureEO programme for Earth observation. Its objective is to study atmospheric gravity waves at an altitude between 80 and 120 km in order to improve climate and space weather modelling. To do this, the satellite will measure airglow using two shortwave infrared imagers.

== Background ==
The mission's primary contractor is the Czech company OHB Czechspace and major subcontractors are the German companies Berlin Space Technologies and OHB System. The mission's science team is led by the German Aerospace Center (DLR).

== History ==
The mission was originally proposed by OHB Czechspace as "SOVA" in 2023 for the "Czech Ambitious Missions" cooperation between ESA and Czechia. It was not selected (the selected missions were AMBIC and QUVIK), but the committee recommended it as a backup. In June 2025, SOVA-S was selected by ESA alongside three other missions out of nine Scout mission proposals for further study. SOVA-S was selected for implementation, together with another proposal named Hibidis, in May 2026. The signing of the mission's development contract is expected by the end of 2026, mission implementation phase is expected to start in January 2027 and the satellite is expected to launch in 2030.

== See also ==
- List of European Space Agency programmes and missions
- List of Czech satellites
