= Advisory Committee for Earth Observation =

Advisory body to the European Space Agency

The Advisory Committee for Earth Observation (ACEO) is the senior advisory body to the European Space Agency's (ESA's) Director of Earth Observation (EO) Programmes.

== Role ==
ACEO is the main interpreter of the views and needs of the European scientific community as regards access to space experimentation and EO data exploitation in the science community. Its main tasks are to advise and/or make recommendations on:

- the needs of the scientific community for spaceborne observations of Earth;
- scientific activities during the development, implementation and exploitation of the approved projects of ESA's Earth Observation programmes
- the formulation and updating of medium and long-term Earth Observation Science Strategy in Europe in regard to the interests of the scientific community;
- the priorities of the scientific community in the selection (and extension) and formulation of future Earth observation missions, and the associated Calls for Proposals for new mission ideas;
- the science aspects in relation to the evolution of operational Earth Observation missions in terms of the space segment (planning, succession, Long-Term Scenario), the operational services and the impact of operational missions on EO Science;
- the contribution of ESA EO missions to address major societal issues;
- the scientific studies and activities required to lay the foundations for future missions;
- the selection of new scientific projects.

The ACEO has the highest-level advisory capacity, through the Director of Earth Observation Programmes (D/EOP), for matters to be treated at the level of the Programme Board for Earth Observation (PB-EO), which may also request advice on particular issues of a scientific nature.

== Membership ==
ACEO is composed of invited members who are senior European scientific experts and ex-officio representatives of relevant stakeholder bodies, and is managed by the ACEO Secretariat in the Earth and Mission Science Division. ACEO members are selected ESA Executive to achieve diversity and balance in scientific expertise across the relevant Earth science disciplines, from within ESA's 23 Member States and Cooperating States.

Membership appointments are for a period of three years with the possibility to extend to a maximum of five years. The tenure of the chair is for three years, independent of previous normal membership, with the possibility of a one-year extension.

The Chair of the PB-EO is invited, ex officio, to attend the meetings of the ACEO. Furthermore, representatives of other ESA Directorates’ Science Advisory Committees may be invited to attend.

Representatives of scientific or professional organisations with a stake in Earth Observation (e.g. European Space Sciences Committee (ESSC) of the European Science Foundation, whose expertise may be required by ACEO to properly fulfil its functions can also be invited, ex-officio and Ad Personam, to attend the meetings.

== Operating Procedure ==
The Committee meets at dates and places jointly agreed between the chair and the Director of Earth Observation Programmes.

ACEO provides advice and/or makes recommendations on the items referred to it by the Director of Earth Observation Programmes. Members of the Committee may however raise issues they wish to discuss.

The Chair of the ACEO reports on the committee's recommendations at the meetings of the PB-EO. The Chair of PB-EO can make a request to the Director of Earth Observation Programmes for ACEO to carry out specific actions in the framework of its mandate.

The ACEO Secretariat is managed by ESA's Earth and Mission Science Division.

== Current and Past Chairpersons ==
- 2023–present: Prof. R. Forsberg
- 2020-2023: Dr. F. Rabier
- 2018-2021: Prof. M. Visbeck
- 2014-2018: Prof. W. Mauser
- 2010-2014: Prof. A. O'Neill
- 2007-2010: Prof. J. Johannessen
- 2003-2007: Prof. H. Graßl
- 1999-2003: Prof. L. Bengtsson
- 1996-1999: Prof. G. Mégie

== Current Members ==
- Prof. Jonathan Bamber (UK)
- Dr. Annett Bartsch (AT)
- Prof. Carla Braitenberg (IT)
- Prof. Helène Chepfer (FR)
- Dr. Cyril Crevoisier (FR)
- Prof. Gabriëlle De Lannoy (BE)
- Prof. Rene Forsberg (DK), ACEO Chair
- Dr. Anne Fouilloux (NO)
- Dr. Vincent-Henri Peuch (DE)
- Prof. Markus Rapp (DE)
- Prof. Anna Rutgersson (SE)
- Prof. Rosalia Santoleri (IT)
- Dr. Else Swinnen (BE)
- Prof. Chris Rapley, Ex-officio Member (ESSC Chair)
- Prof. Olivier Grasset, Ex-officio Member (SSAC Chair)
- Prof. Jarkko Koskinen, Ex-officio Member (PB-EO Chair)

== History ==
The ACEO was established in 2018 to replace the former Earth Science Advisory Committee (ESAC) as the senior advisory body to the Director of Earth Observation.

The former Earth Science Advisory Committee had been in place operating as the main science advisory body from the inception of the ESA Living Planet Programme in 1996 until 2018. Prior to that the Earth Observation Advisory Committee (EOAC), created in 1981, had been the senior scientific advisory body to the Application Satellites Directorate on programmes, projects, studies and application of this field.

== Frontiers of Science ==
ACEO meetings typically include a "Frontiers of Science" agenda item, where scientific topics are discussed with the broader ESA audience. Past presentations are listed below:

- ACEO No.01, Martin Visbeck, (Ocean) Sustainability, Innovation and Partnership
- ACEO No.02, Daniel Selva, Architecting Earth Observing Systems: Architecting Earth Observing Systems: An overview and comparison of processes
- ACEO No.03, Maria Brovelli & Jacqui McGlade, EO in Society: Open Science and Innovation
- ACEO No.04, Thomas Blaschke, Space 4.0 and Big Earth data: towards integrated Earth Observation Science
- ACEO No.05, No presentation (Earth Explorer 9 Selection Meeting)
- ACEO No.06, Piet Stammes, TROPOMI on Sentinel-5P: Monitoring atmospheric composition for air quality and climate applications
- ACEO No.07, Johanna Tamminen, Space-based carbon dioxide observations to support Paris Agreement
- ACEO No.08, No presentation (Scout Selection Meeting)
- ACEO No.09, No presentation ( Earth Explorer 10 Candidate Selection Meeting)
- ACEO No.10, Florence Rabier, The Value of Observations in Earth System Modelling
- ACEO No.11, Andrew Watson, Observing the changing ocean carbon cycle
- ACEO No.12, Sonia Senevirvatne, Weather and Climate Extremes in a Changing Climate: Newest evidence and relevance for ESA
- ACEO No.13, René Forsberg, Measuring the melting cryosphere from space and airborne missions
- ACEO No.14, No presentation (Earth Explorer 10 User Consultation Meeting)
- ACEO No.15, Nico Sneeuw, Gravitational remote sensing of system Earth
- ACEO No.16, Kathy Whaler, The Earth’s deep interior and satellite magnetometry
- ACEO No.17, Keith Raney, Microwave System Science – Once and Present Frontier
- ACEO No.18, No presentation (Earth Explorer 11 User Consultation Meeting)
- ACEO No.19, No presentation (Earth Explorer 12 Candidate Selection Meeting)
- ACEO No.20, Markus Rapp, The MLT-region: the ignorosphere
- ACEO No.21, Helene Chepfer, The Contribution of Space Lidars to Climate Science
- ACEO No.22, Jonathan Bamber, Mass balance of the cryosphere and implications for sea level rise and closing the sea level budget
- ACEO No.23, No presentation (Earth Explorer 11 User Consultation Meeting)
