= Waste biomass fibre =

Plant fibres as a usable by-product

Biomass and waste biomass fibres are derived from renewable sources, where the former is grown as the main crop for fibre production and the latter is derived from waste products such as agricultural residue, municipal solid waste, and industrial waste. WBFs are abundant and readily available, making them a potential source for cleaner production of textile materials for apparel and industrial applications. There are many fibres that can be considered as WBFs, however, canola and cattail are the two major fibres that have potential for apparel and industrial applications.

Canola (Brassica napus L.), which is derived from the plant belonging to the genus Brassica. Canola is one of the largest sources of vegetable oil consumption worldwide, with Canada being the leading manufacturer in 2019/2020 (19 million tonnes). Canola stalks, which are acquired as an agricultural bi-product, are used to extract canola fibers by water retting. The canola stems are left in the field after harvesting the seeds for oil production. Other than assimilation into the soil, the canola plant stems has no economic value once the seeds are harvested. Since there are millions of tonnes of canola stalks ready for disposal, turning the canola stems into fibres adds value and reduces green house gas emissions.

Typha latifolia, more commonly known as cattail is also a source of textile fibre. Cattail fibres are extracted from the leaves of the cattail plant and possess majority of the fibre properties.
