= Harmony (satellite) =

Future ESA satellite mission

- Names: Stereoid; Harmony
- Mission type: Earth observing satellite
- Operator: ESA

Start of mission
- Launch date: 2029 (planned)

Orbital parameters
- Reference system: Geocentric
- Regime: Sun-synchronous
- ESA insignia (2020s) FutureEO

Harmony is a European Earth observing satellite mission projected to launch in 2029 or 2030. The mission concept, belonging to the ESA's FutureEO programme, comprises two identical satellites that will fly in formation with a Copernicus Sentinel-1 satellite. Paco López-Dekker from the Delft University of Technology in the Netherlands is the Lead Investigator of the mission. Florence Hélière is the Project Manager.

== Objectives ==
Over land, the mission will measure small shifts in the shape of the land surface connected with volcanism and earthquakes; it will also study the dynamics of glaciers and ice sheets. Over the ocean, it will measure surface wind, waves, currents, as well as cloud movements and sea-surface temperature differences.

== Instruments ==
Both Harmony satellites will carry a receive-only synthetic aperture radar (intended to work together with Sentinel-1's radar) and a multibeam thermal-infrared instrument. Throughout the life of the mission, the Harmony satellites will be flying either in interferometric or in stereo configurations.

== History ==
In September 2018, Harmony (then named "Stereoid") was selected as one of three concepts to compete for the tenth Earth Explorer mission. In February 2021, Harmony was chosen to be ESA's tenth Earth Explorer mission. In March 2022, the mission concept was tested using two aircraft flying in formation over the Dutch Wadden Islands.

In September 2022, ESA Member States formally selected Harmony for implementation. In October 2024, ESA has awarded a contract (over €280 million) to OHB to build the satellites as prime contractor. In November 2024, OHB has selected ABB to provide thermal infrared imaging instruments for the two satellites.

In June 2025, ESA announced that the mission’s baseline launch vehicle was Vega C Block 2 (with P160C booster upgrade). However, in May 2026, ESA was considering moving the launch to Ariane 62 and potentially early 2030.

== See also ==
- List of European Space Agency programmes and missions
- List of Earth observation satellites

== Links ==
- Flyer: Bringing Harmony to a dynamic world
- Earth Explorer 10 Candidate Mission Harmony: Report for Mission Selection
- Harmony satellites (image)
- Harmony mission patch (image)
