= Hibidis =

European Earth observation satellite for hyperspectral imaging

- Mission type: Earth observation satellite
- Operator: European Space Agency

Spacecraft properties
- Manufacturer: (Italy) SITAEL
- Launch mass: 70 kg (estimated)

Hibidis (Hyperspectral Biodiversity Mission) is a future Earth observation satellite for monitoring Essential Biodiversity Variables under development by the European Space Agency's FutureEO programme. The satellite will study understorey ecosystem biodiversity by observing Earth's surface from multiple angles using a hyperspectral imager to separate data about forest canopies from those about understories. The mission's primary contractor is the Italian company SITAEL and the consortium also includes Belgian companies Amos and Vito and the University of Zurich. Hibidis was selected for implementation as a Scout-type mission, together with another proposal named SOVA-S, in May 2026.

== See also ==
- List of European Space Agency programmes and missions
