= Wivern (satellite) =

Future European Earth observation satellite mission

- Mission type: Earth observation satellite
- Operator: ESA
- Website: wivern.polito.it

Start of mission
- Launch date: NET 2032

Wivern (Wind Velocity Radar Nephoscope) is a future Earth observation satellite under development by the European Space Agency (ESA). Wivern will be the first space mission to measure winds inside clouds, filling a major gap in weather observations. Additionally, Wivern will provide high resolution measurements of rain, snowfall, and clouds. Its primary instrument will be a dual-polarization Dopplerized weather radar scanning the atmosphere in a conical geometry. The launch of Wivern is planned for early 2030s.

== Project history ==
The competition for the Earth Explorer 11 mission began on 10 June 2021. A call for proposal ideas was released on 25 May 2020, with the deadline for submission on 4 December 2020. Four candidates were chosen to compete for the opportunity in June 2021: Cairt, Nitrosat, Seastar, and Wivern. In November 2023, Cairt and Wivern have been selected as the final two competing entries with a projected launch date in 2032 or 2033. Wivern has been recommended on 9 July 2025 at a meeting in Prague, although ESA’s Advisory Committee for Earth Observation also strongly encouraged further development of Cairt for future mission opportunities. On 23 September 2025, ESA’s Member States have officially selected Wivern as ESA's 11th Earth Explorer mission.

== See also ==
- List of European Space Agency programmes and missions
- Living Planet Programme
- List of Earth observation satellites
