= Next Generation Gravity Mission =

Proposed European Earth observation satellite mission

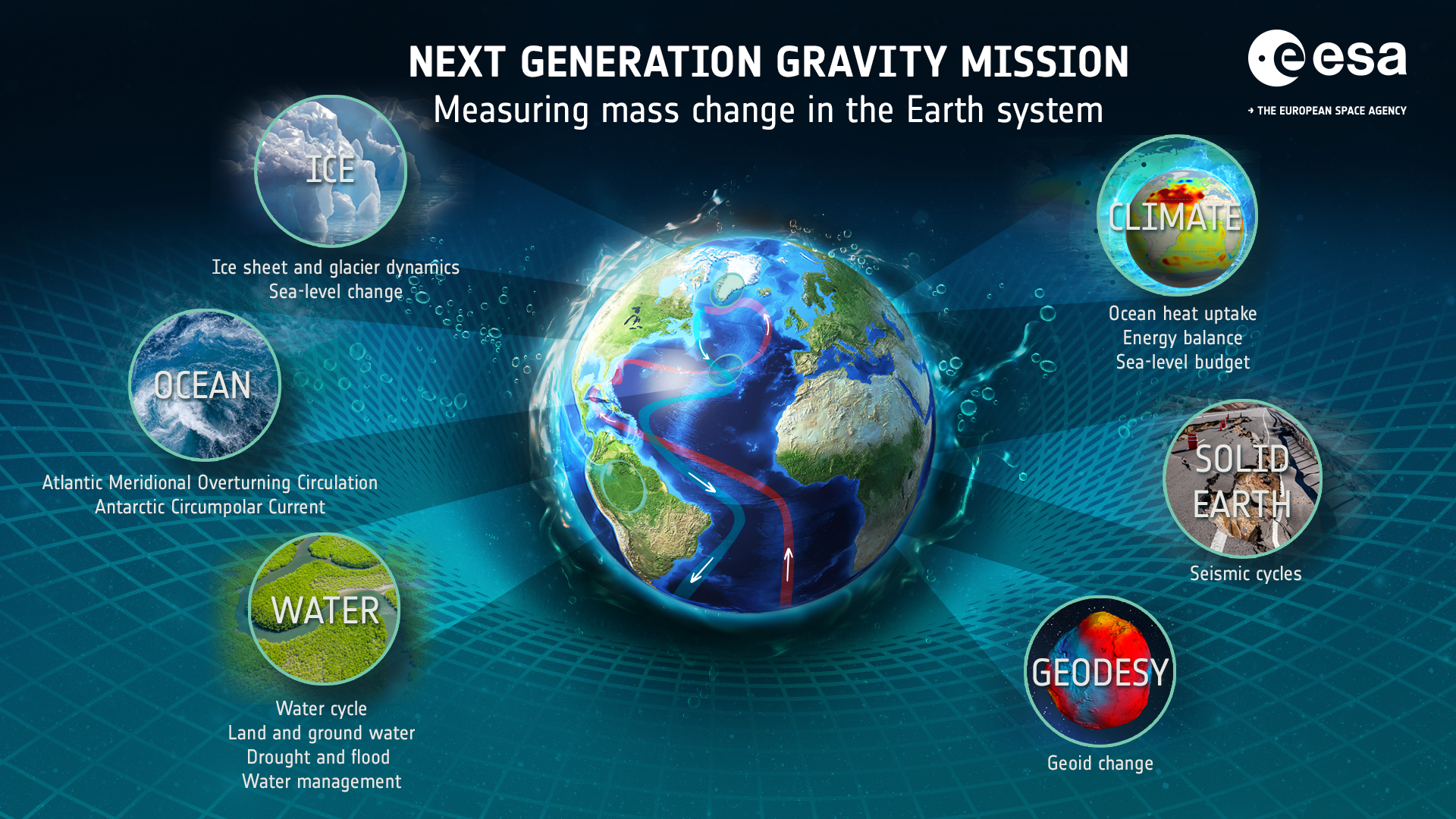
- Operator: European Space Agency

Start of mission
- Launch date: 2032 (planned)

Orbital parameters
- Reference system: geocentric
- Altitude: 400 km
- Inclination: Between 65° and 75°

The Next Generation Gravity Mission (NGGM) is a proposed Earth observation satellite mission under development by the European Space Agency's FutureEO programme. If approved, it will launch in 2032 as a pair of satellites flying in the same low Earth orbit in an in-line formation, separated by approximately 100 km. The satellites will precisely map Earth's gravity field by monitoring short-period changes in the distance between them using laser interferometry.

NGGM will form part of the MAss Change and Geosciences International Constellation (MAGIC) together with NASA's GRACE-C pair of satellites. The MAGIC satellite constellation is intended to extend the more than two decades long time series of monthly gravity field models by the GRACE and GRACE-FO missions. If implemented, NGGM will be the first Mission of Opportunity in the FutureEO programme.

== See also ==
- List of European Space Agency programmes and missions
