= Tango (satellites) =

European space mission for monitoring greenhouse gases

- Names: Scout 4
- Mission type: Earth observation satellite
- Operator: European Space Agency

Spacecraft properties
- Bus: 2x 16U CubeSat
- Manufacturer: (Netherlands) ISISPACE

Start of mission
- Launch date: 2028 (planned)

Orbital parameters
- Reference system: Geocentric
- ESA insingia FutureEO: Scout missions

Tango (Twin ANthropogenic Greenhouse Gas Observers) is a future twin satellite mission under development by the European Space Agency (ESA) for monitoring the emissions of three greenhouse gases at the level of individual sources like factories, power plants, landfills, and waste incinerators.

== Overview ==
One of the two 25-kg, 16U CubeSat-type satellites (TANGO-Nitro) will focus on nitrogen dioxide and the other (TANGO-Carbon) on carbon dioxide and methane. The satellites are being developed by a Dutch consortium of ISISPACE, TNO, SRON, and KNMI. Their launch is expected in 2028.

== See also ==
- List of European Space Agency programmes and missions
