= Biomass (satellite) =

European earth observation satellite

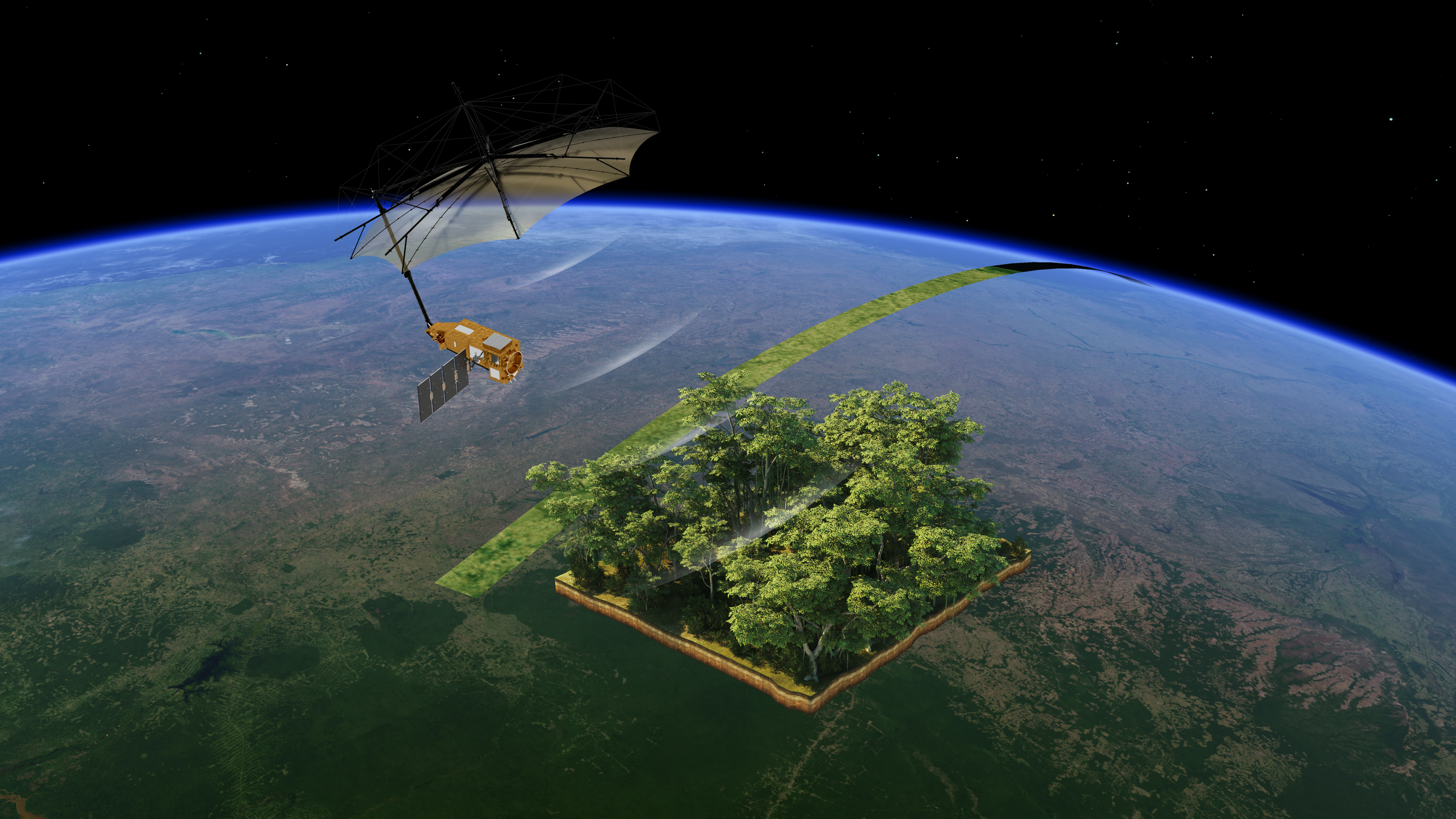
- ESA Biomass satellite rendering
- Mission type: Earth observation satellite
- Operator: ESA
- COSPAR ID: 2025-090A
- SATCAT no.: 63772
- Website: https://www.esa.int/Applications/Observing_the_Earth/FutureEO/Biomass
- Mission duration: 5 years (planned); 1 year, 5 months, 6 days (in progress)

Spacecraft properties
- Bus: Astrobus
- Manufacturer: Airbus Defence and Space (UK)
- Launch mass: 1,170 kilograms (2,580 lb)
- Power: 1500 watts

Start of mission
- Launch date: 29 April 2025, 09:15:00 UTC
- Rocket: Vega C
- Launch site: Kourou ELV
- Contractor: Arianespace

Orbital parameters
- Reference system: Geocentric
- Regime: Sun-synchronous
- Altitude: 660 km
- ESA insingia FutureEO

Biomass is an Earth observing satellite of the European Space Agency (ESA) launched in 2025. The mission is intended to provide the first comprehensive measurements of global forest biomass and is expected to significantly improve the understanding of carbon storage, forest health, and temporal changes of forest ecosystems. It is meant to last for five years, monitoring at least eight growth cycles in the world's forests.

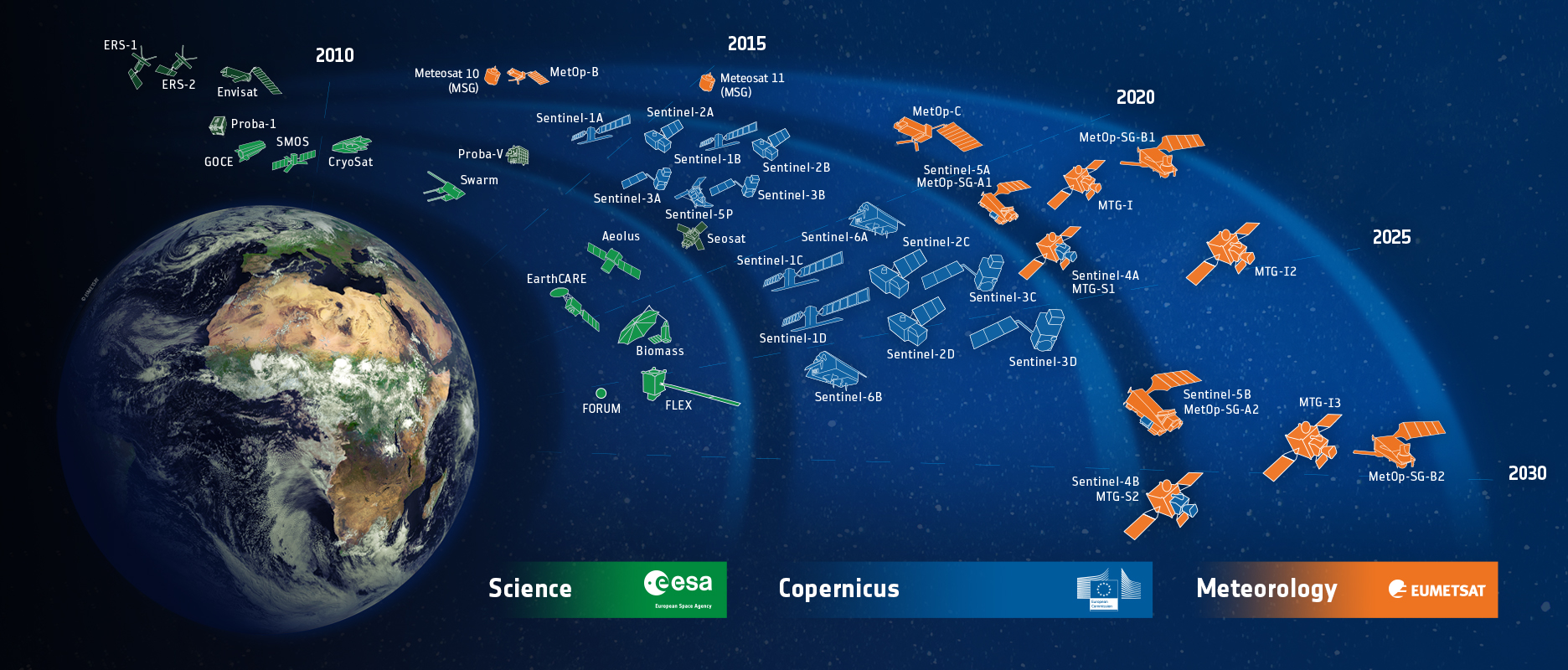
ESA-developed Earth observation missions

Overview of ESA's Biomass Earth Explorer satellite

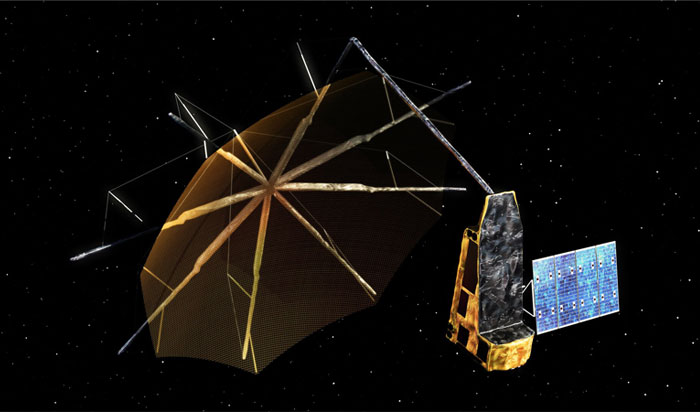
An artist's impression of the Biomass satellite

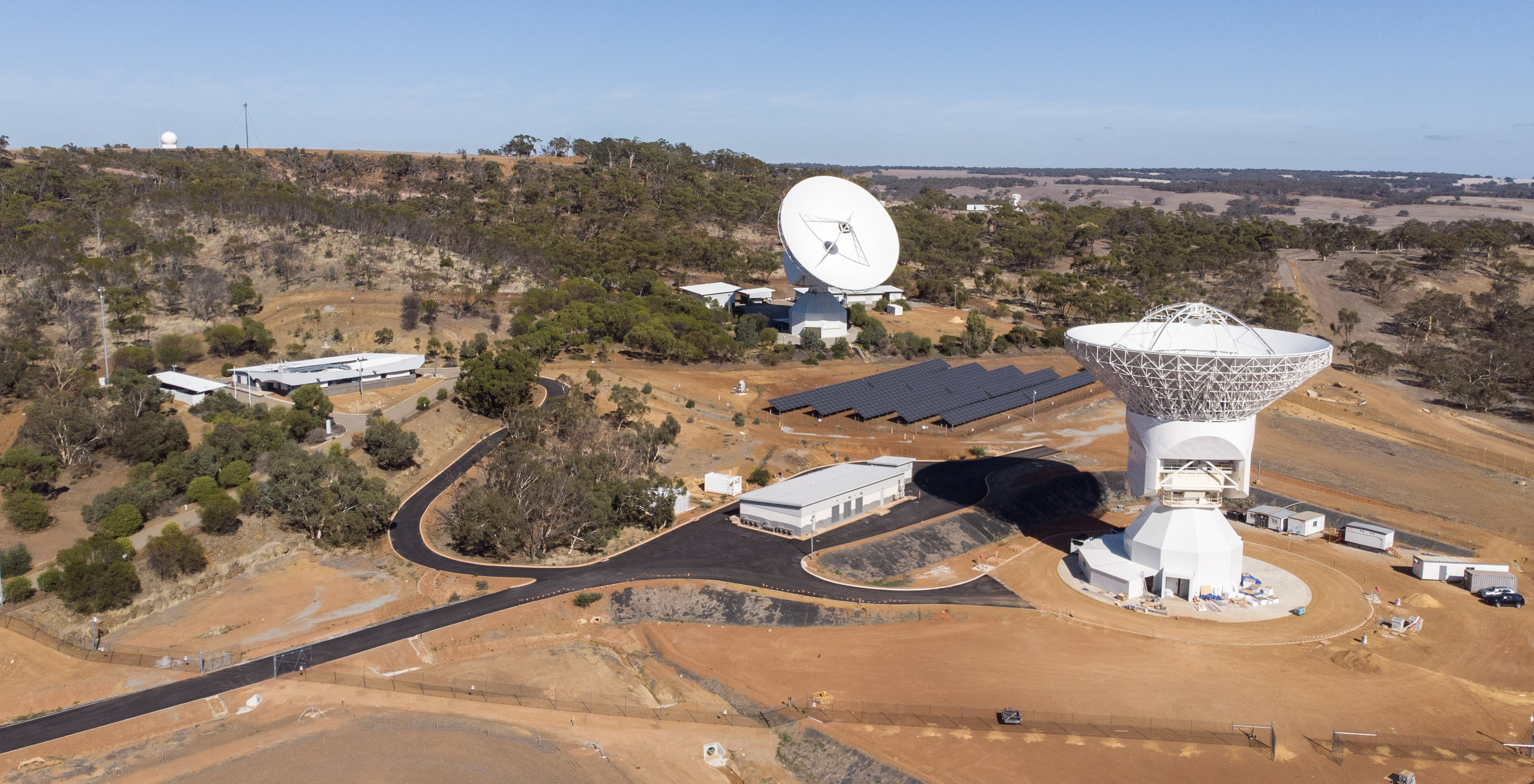
New Norcia Station showing all antennas. NNO-1 is in the centre, NNO-3 at bottom right, NNO 2 is on the ridge-line, and the Biomass calibration transponder is at the top of the hill

== Background ==
The Biomass satellite is part of ESA's FutureEO programme, which consists of Earth observation missions. Its initial launch date was set to 2020, but that was later delayed to 2025.

The entire cost of the mission was placed at around 400 million euros. The main scientific instrument aboard Biomass is a synthetic aperture radar (SAR) operating at 435 MHz. The satellite measures 10 x 12 x 20 m, weighs around 1.2 tonnes and orbits the Earth at an altitude of 666 km.

All devices for assembly of the satellite structure, including vertical transport equipment, assembly and disassembly of satellite panels, assembly and disassembly of the synthetic aperture radar are done by the Spanish company SENER.

== Radar ==
Biomass carries a fully polarimetric P-band synthetic aperture radar (SAR), built by Airbus Defence and Space in Friedrichshafen, Germany, and a large 12-m deployable antenna supplied by L3Harris. The radar operates at a centre frequency of 435 MHz with a bandwidth of 6 MHz in stripmap mode. It is designed to provide global coverage through repeated acquisitions of forested areas. The system uses the 12 m deployable reflector antenna to achieve the required coverage and performance for biomass mapping.

The SAR instrument consists of two main functional elements: the Instrument Electronics System (INES) and the Feed Array. The INES comprises the digital and radio-frequency electronics required for radar operation, including Digital Control Unit (DCU) developed by Airbus Defence and Space for instrument control, radar timing, signal generation, science data handling, and internal calibration. The Power Amplifier Subsystem (PAS), developed by Leonardo, provides the transmit signal amplification to around 50 dBm per Feed Array port, while the Receive Amplifier Subsystem (RAS), developed by Sener, enables low-noise reception of the radar echoes. The RAS is protected by a limiter at its input against possible strong interference emitted by P-band ground sources such as Space Objects Tracking Radars (SOTR) and Wind Profilers. The Calibration and Distribution Network (CDN), developed by Airbus Defence and Space Italy, provides radio-frequency signal routing and internal calibration signal distribution. The Feed Array is provided Thales Alenia Space, Italy. It forms the radio-frequency transmit and receive interface to the deployable reflector antenna and is designed to mitigate cross-polarisation effects introduced by the offset reflector geometry.

The radar is used to observe forests between 75° north and 56° south, but doesn't cover North and Central America, Europe, and parts of the Arctic to avoid interfering with the US Department of Defense space object tracking radars.

To calibrate the spacecraft's radar, ESA has installed a custom-built transponder (Biomass Calibration Transponder; BCT) at New Norcia Station in Australia. BCT was used intensively during the spacecraft's six-month commissioning period. It is expected to be used two times a year during regular operations.

== Scientific objectives ==
The main objective of the mission is to measure forest biomass in order to assess terrestrial carbon stocks and fluxes and better understand the planet's carbon cycle. The Biomass mission will explore Earth's surface at the P-band wavelength, the first time this technique is used from orbit. This will allow it to provide accurate maps of tropical, temperate and boreal forest biomass that are not obtainable by ground measurement techniques. The amount of biomass and forest height will be measured at a resolution of 200 m, and forest disturbances such as clear-cutting at a resolution of 50 m.

Its stated objectives are:

1. Reduce the large uncertainties in the carbon flux due to changes in land use
2. Provide scientific support for international treaties, agreements and programs such as the UN's REDD (Reducing Emissions from Deforestation and Forest Degradation in Developing Countries) program
3. Improve understanding and predictions of landscape-scale carbon dynamics
4. Provide observations to initialize and test the land element of Earth system models
5. Provide key information for forest resources management and ecosystem services.

It is expected that the data sent back from the satellite will also contribute new information to other areas of climate science, like measuring the biomass of desert regions to find fossil water and new water sources in arid regions as well as contributing to observations of ice sheet dynamics, subsurface geology and forest topography.

== Timeline ==
=== Development ===
- In May 2013, Biomass was announced as ESA's 7th Earth Explorer.
- In February 2015, ESA Member States gave the green light for the project's full implementation.
- In May 2016, it was announced that Airbus Defence and Space UK will build the satellite under a contract valued at 229 million euros.
- In October 2019, ESA and Arianespace signed a contract for the launch of Biomass on a Vega launch vehicle from French Guiana. At that time, the launch was planned for 2022.
- In 2022, the 5-m diameter Biomass Calibration Transponder (BCT) was tested at ESA’s Hertz radio frequency test chamber at ESTEC. It was the largest antenna ever tested in the facility.
- During 2022, the satellite was assembled at Airbus in Stevenage, UK.
- In November 2022, the satellite was transported from the UK to Airbus' Astrolabe facilities in Toulouse, France for testing.
- In 2023, the Biomass Calibration Transponder (BCT) was assembled and installed at New Norcia Station, Australia.
- In 2024, two scientists from the Technical University of Denmark spent two months in Antarctica, testing a P-band synthetic aperture radar, mimicking the Biomass instrument, on a Basler aircraft.

=== Launch campaign ===
Rolling Biomass to the cleanroom

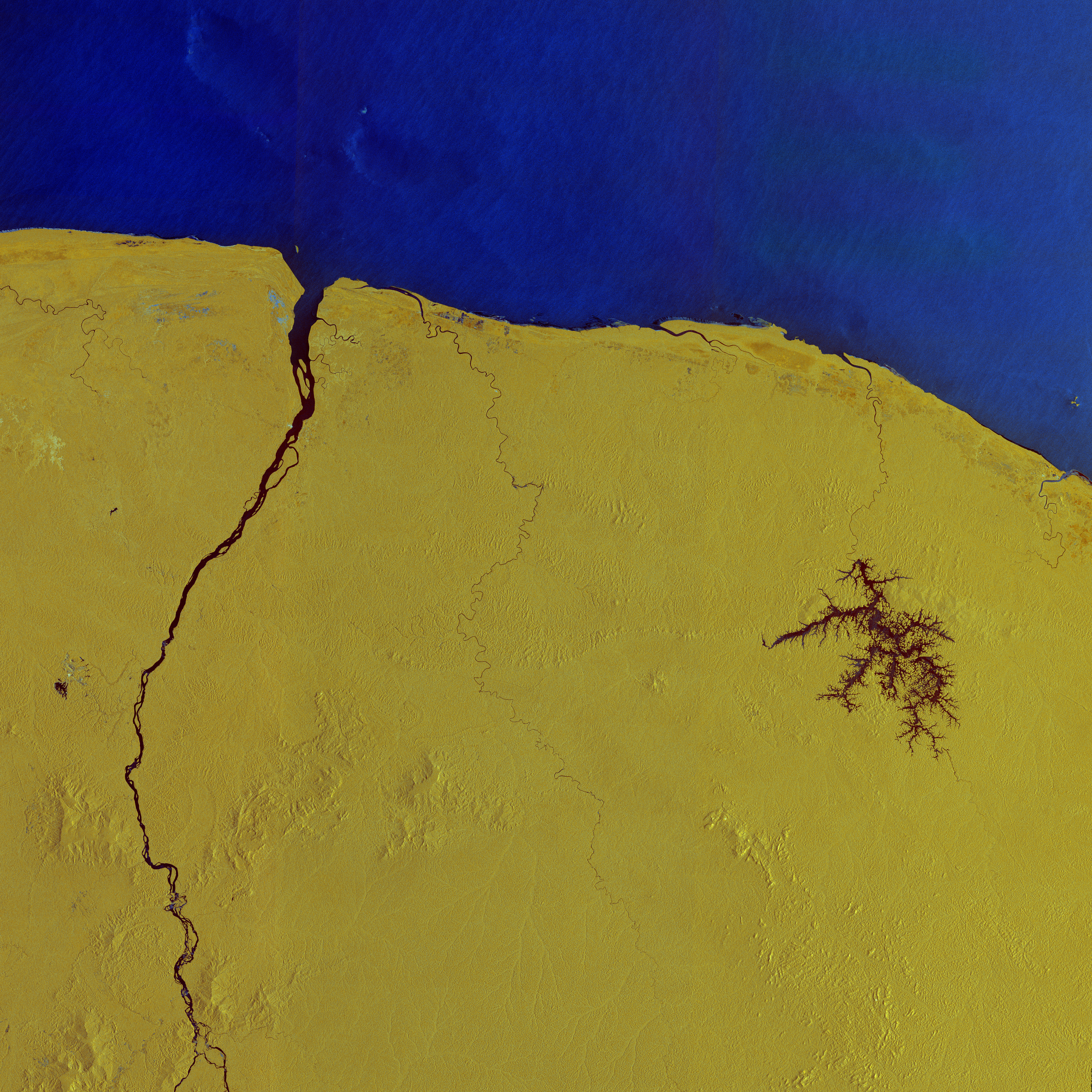
Copernicus Sentinel-1 captured this radar image over French Guiana – home to Europe’s Spaceport in Kourou, while Biomass was being prepared for liftoff from there.

- In February 2025, the satellite was pronounced ready for packing and shipping from Toulouse to French Guiana for a launch planned for April 2025 and on 21 February, it has left Toulouse for the port of Sète.
- In March 2025, after almost two weeks at sea aboard the cargo ship MN Toucan, the satellite arrived at Pariacabo – the harbour of the Guiana Space Centre – and was transported to the spaceport's cleanroom.
- In late March 2025, Biomass' propulsion subsystem has been cleared for fuelling.
- On 25 March 2025, Arianespace announced the expected time of launch of Vega C with the Biomass satellite: 29 April 2025, at 6:15 am GFT (09:15 UTC). The launcher mission was named VV26.
- In early April 2025, the satellite was fully loaded with 132 kg of fuel. On 15 April, the satellite was connected to Vega-C using the VAMPIRE (Vega Adapter for Multiple Payload Injection and Release) and on 16 April, it has been sealed inside the protective fairing of the rocket. On 22 April, Vega-C with Biomass has been rolled out to the launch pad.
- Over the last four months before launch, ESA's European Space Operations Centre in Darmstadt has been preparing for the launch with a simulation campaign, culminating with a comprehensive final rehearsal of the countdown and launch sequence on 23 April.
- On the launch day of 29 April 2025, ESA WebTV live coverage started at 8:55 UTC. Vega C with Biomass launched as planned at 09:15 UTC and the satellite successfully separated. This was the 353rd launch by Arianespace, the 4th Vega C launch, and the 146th spacecraft built by Airbus Defence and Space launched by Arianespace. At 10:28 UTC, the satellite controllers at ESOC received first signal from the satellite, relayed via the Troll ground station in Antarctica.

=== In orbit ===
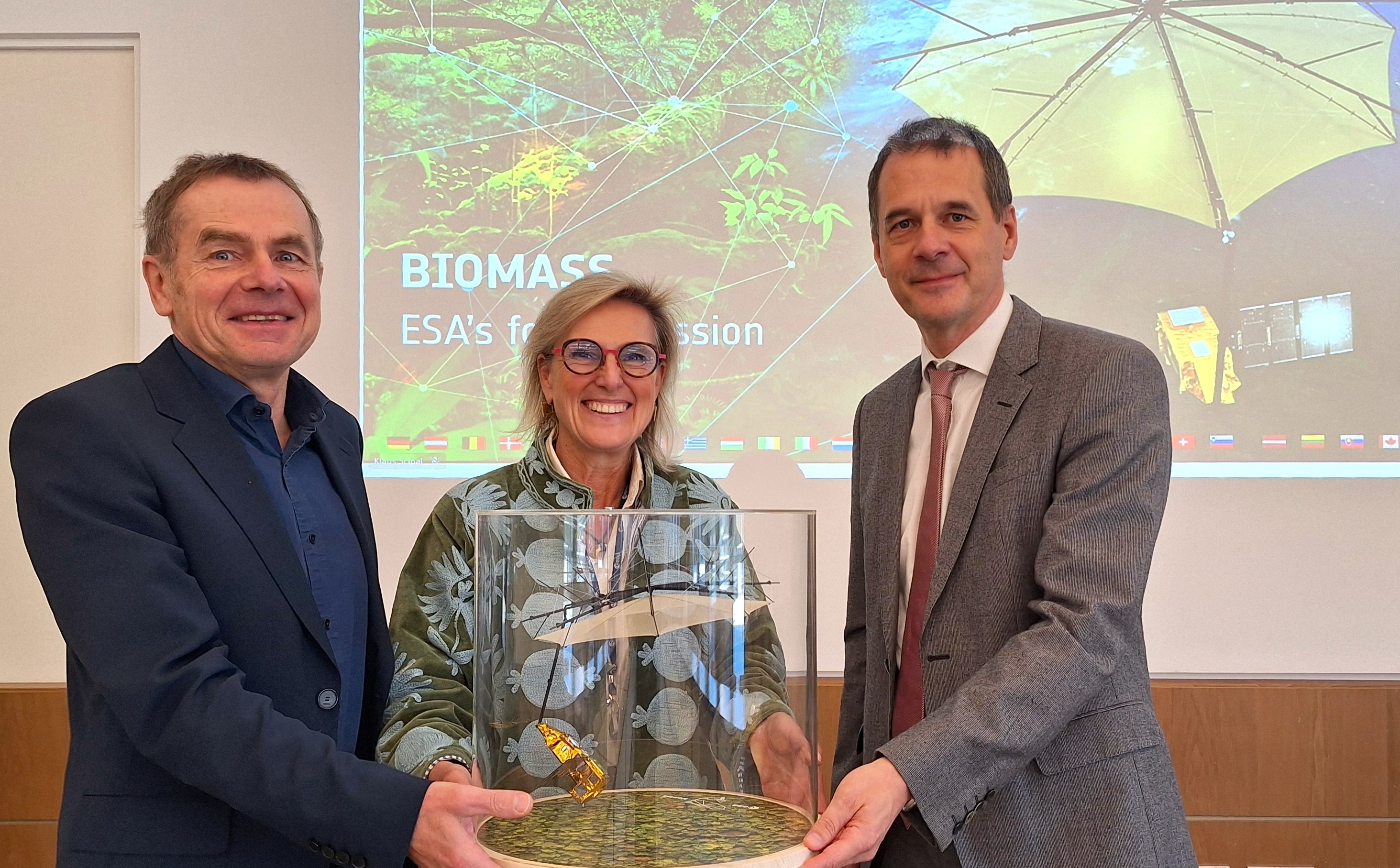
Biomass mission goes from commissioning to scientific operations

- On 2 May 2025, just 3 days after the satellite's launch, ESA has released its most extensive maps of above-ground forest carbon to date that integrate data from multiple satellite missions before Biomass: the "ESA Climate Change Initiative Biomass Dataset Version 6"
- First 9 days in space were dedicated to the Launch and Early Orbit Phase (LEOP). This period usually takes only 3 to 4 days in comparable missions. However, the complex deployment of the Biomass' antenna required a longer LEOP. The 7.5-m-long boom of the antenna was deployed during a 3 day operation which required the simultaneous coverage of 2 ground stations. The following reflector deployment required the simultaneous coverage of 3 ground stations with only 2 possible deployment slots per day. During the antenna deployment, the spacecraft was in a state of limited manoeuvrability and could not perform collision avoidance manoeuvres.
- On 7 May 2025, ESA announced that the satellite's 12-m-diameter radar antenna has been fully deployed.
- On 8 May 2025, the LEOP officially concluded and in a traditional ceremony, the spacecraft's name was added to the historic list of missions on the wall of ESA's Main Control Room in Darmstadt.
- On 23 June 2025, ESA published the first radar images from Biomass, covering parts of Bolivia, Brazil, Indonesia, Gabon, Chad, and Antarctica.
- In January 2026, Biomass completed its commissioning phase and its data stream was made open and public by ESA.
- On 29 April 2026, ESA celebrated one year since the satellite's launch by publishing a series of polarimetric synthetic aperture radar images, captured by Biomass over the preceding year.

== Gallery ==
Examples of images produced from Biomass data:

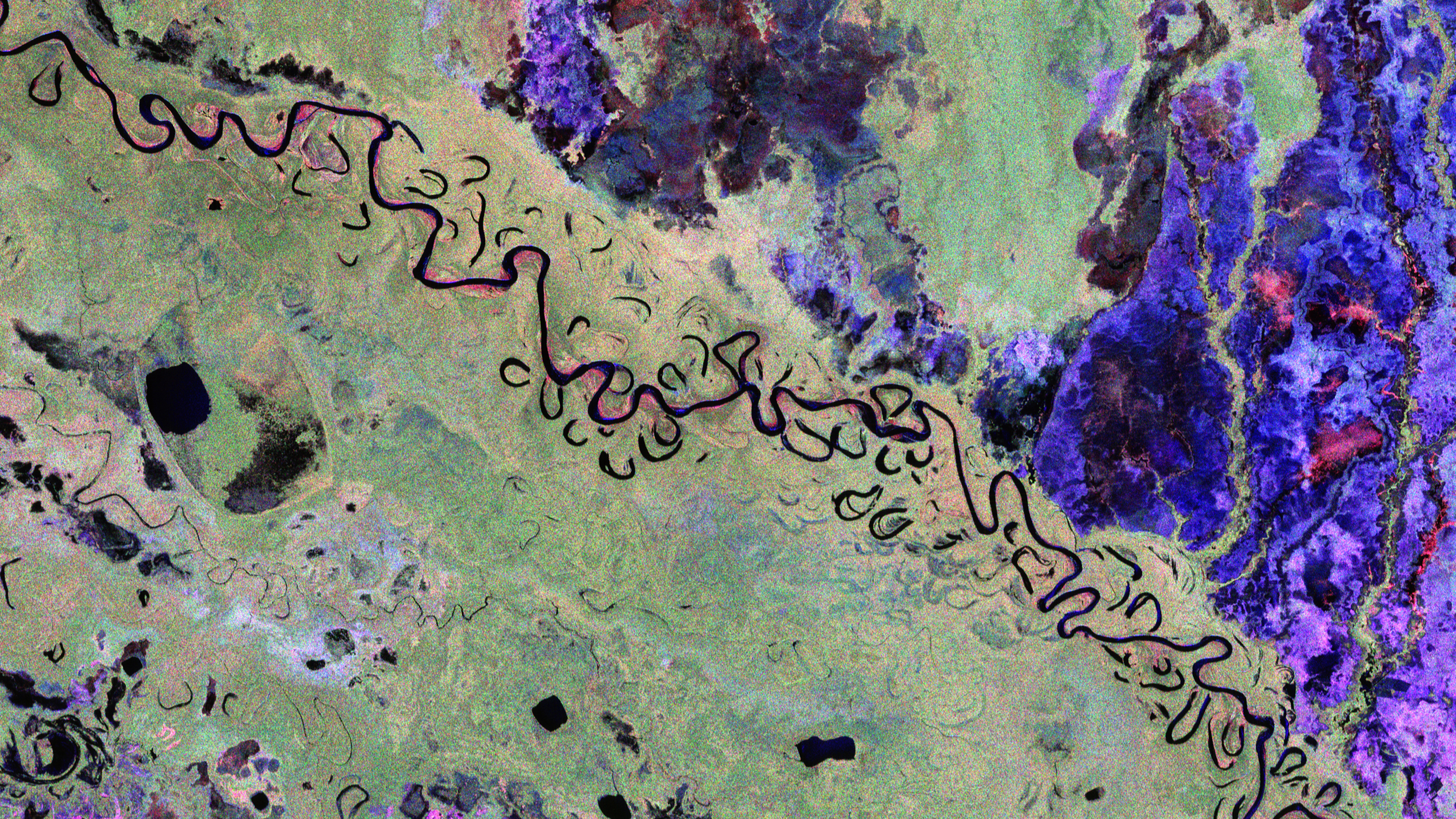
Bolivian forest and landscape from Biomass (green: rainforest, red: forested floodplains and wetlands, blue–purple: grasslands, black: rivers and lakes).

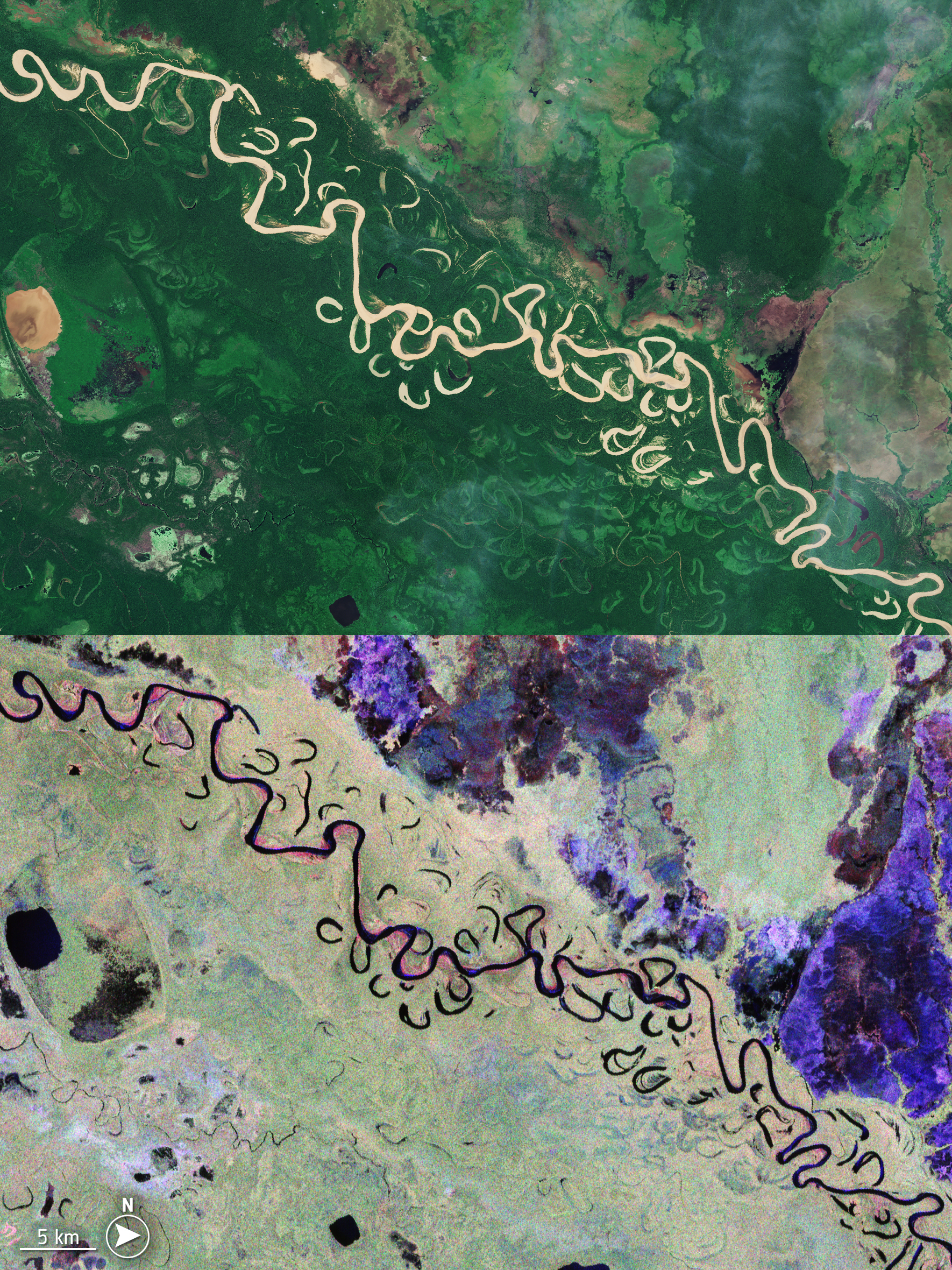
Bolivian forest—comparing Sentinel-2 and Biomass. The long-wavelength radar of Biomass can penetrate the canopy. The optical Sentinel-2 image captures only the top of the canopy.

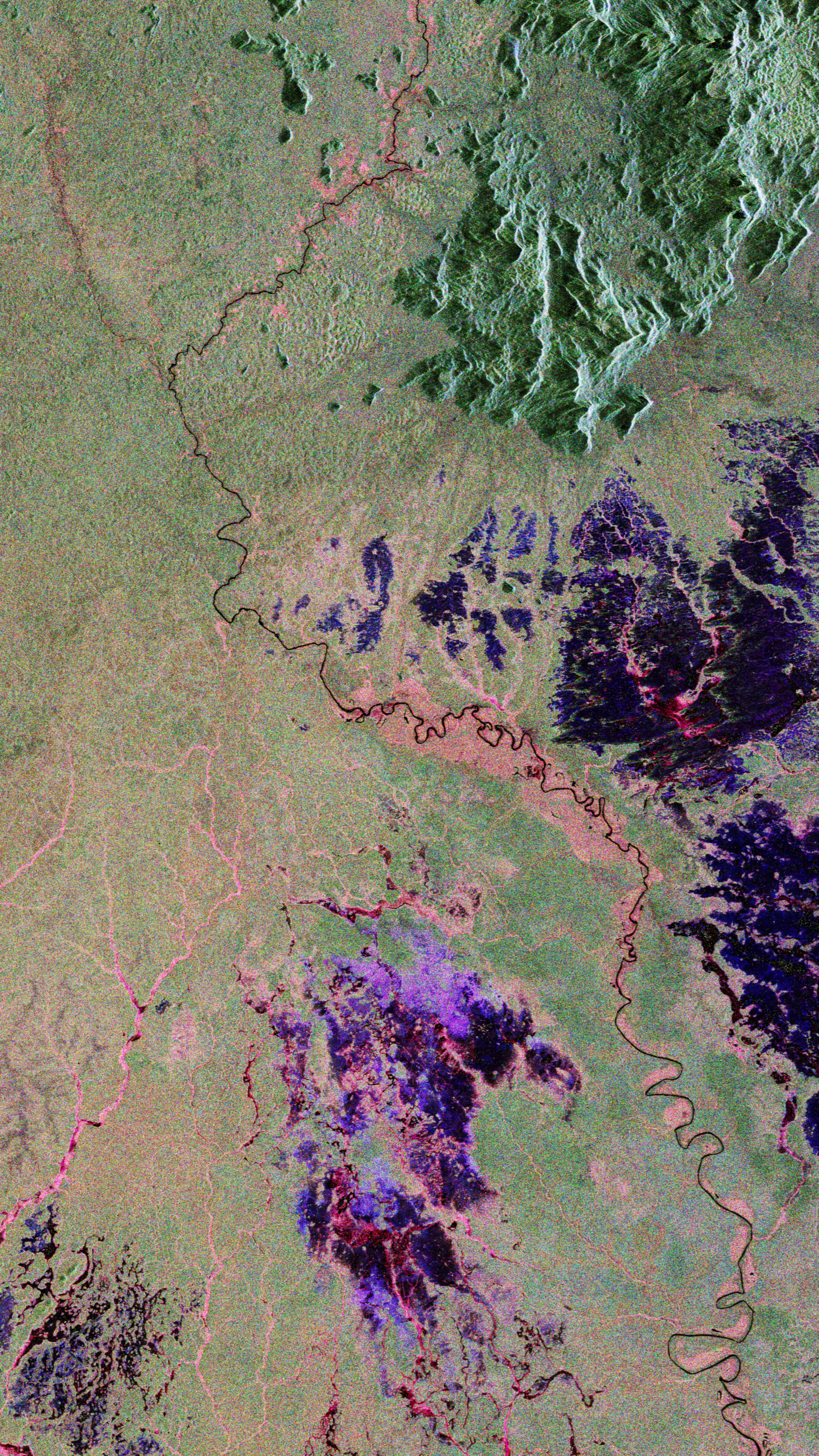
A view of the Amazon rainforest in northern Brazil. The image spans approximately 100 km along the Biomass satellite's flight path and 60 km across in width.

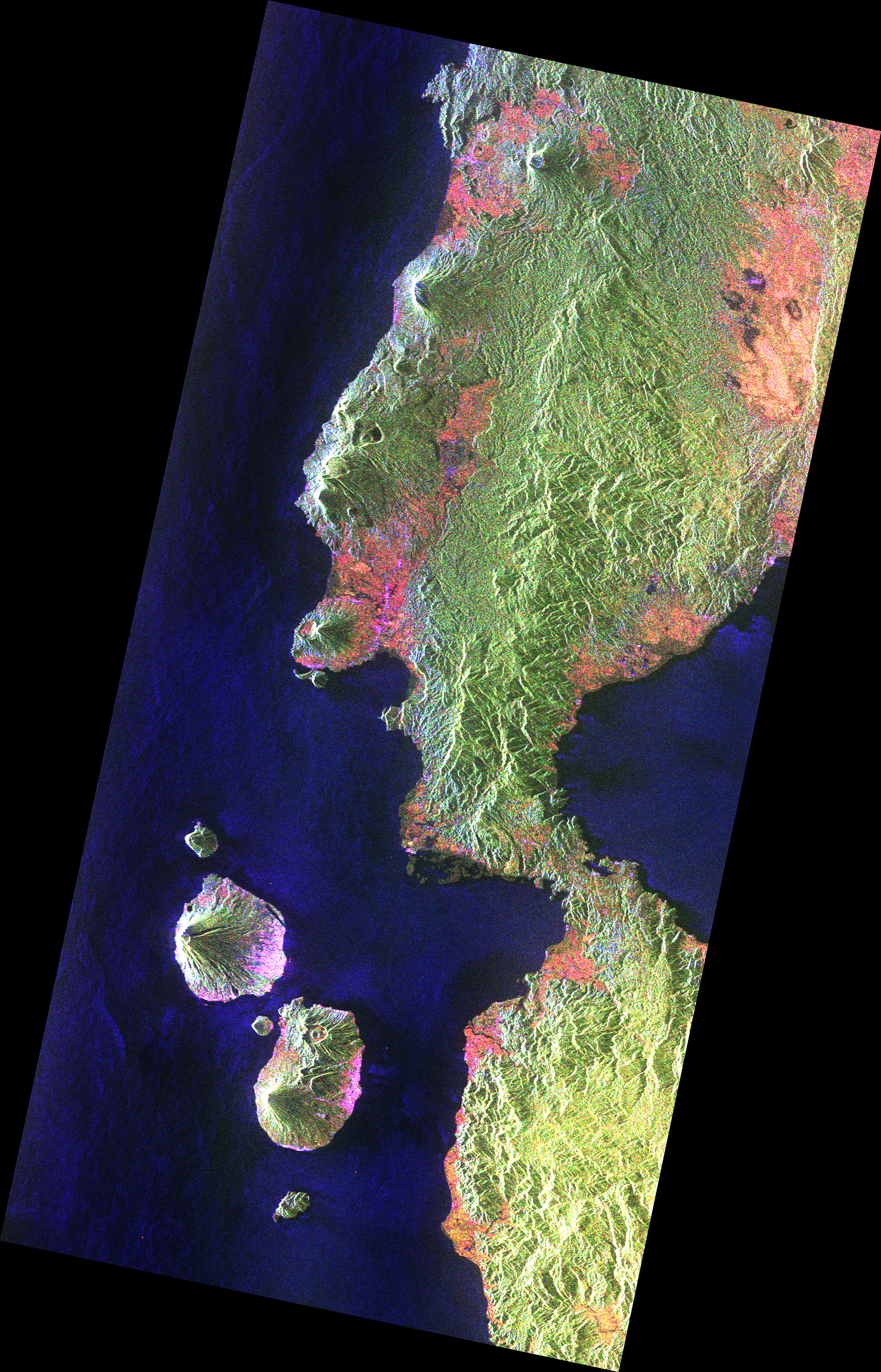
This image from Biomass depicts tropical forest on islands in Indonesia. This is the Halmahera rainforest, situated in mountainous terrain, much of which has volcanic origins.

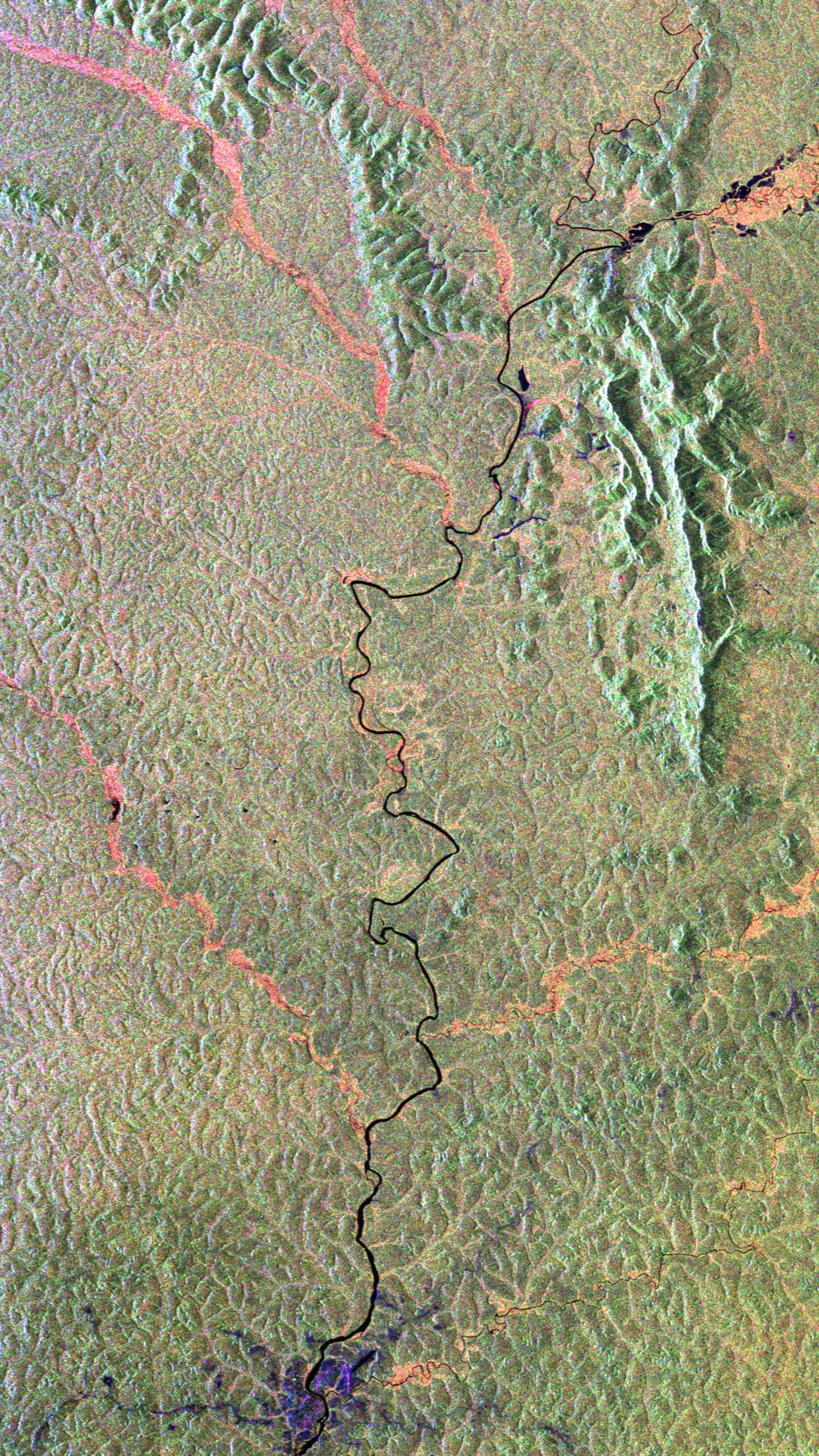
Biomass captured this image over Gabon in Africa. Other than the Ivindo River, and tributaries, the image is predominantly green, representing dense forest.

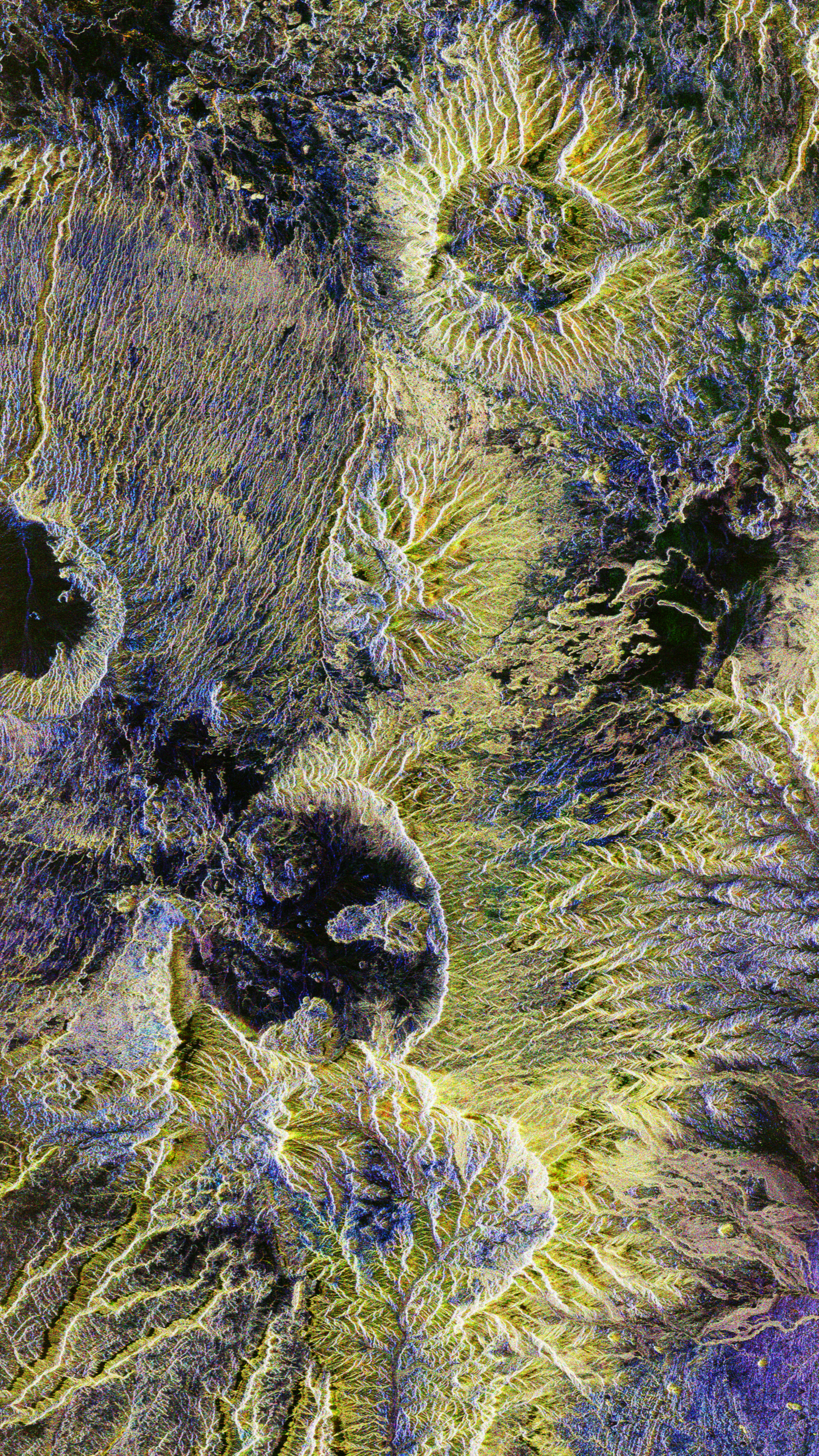
This image covers part of the Tibesti Mountains, a mountain range in the central Sahara, primarily located in the extreme north of Chad.

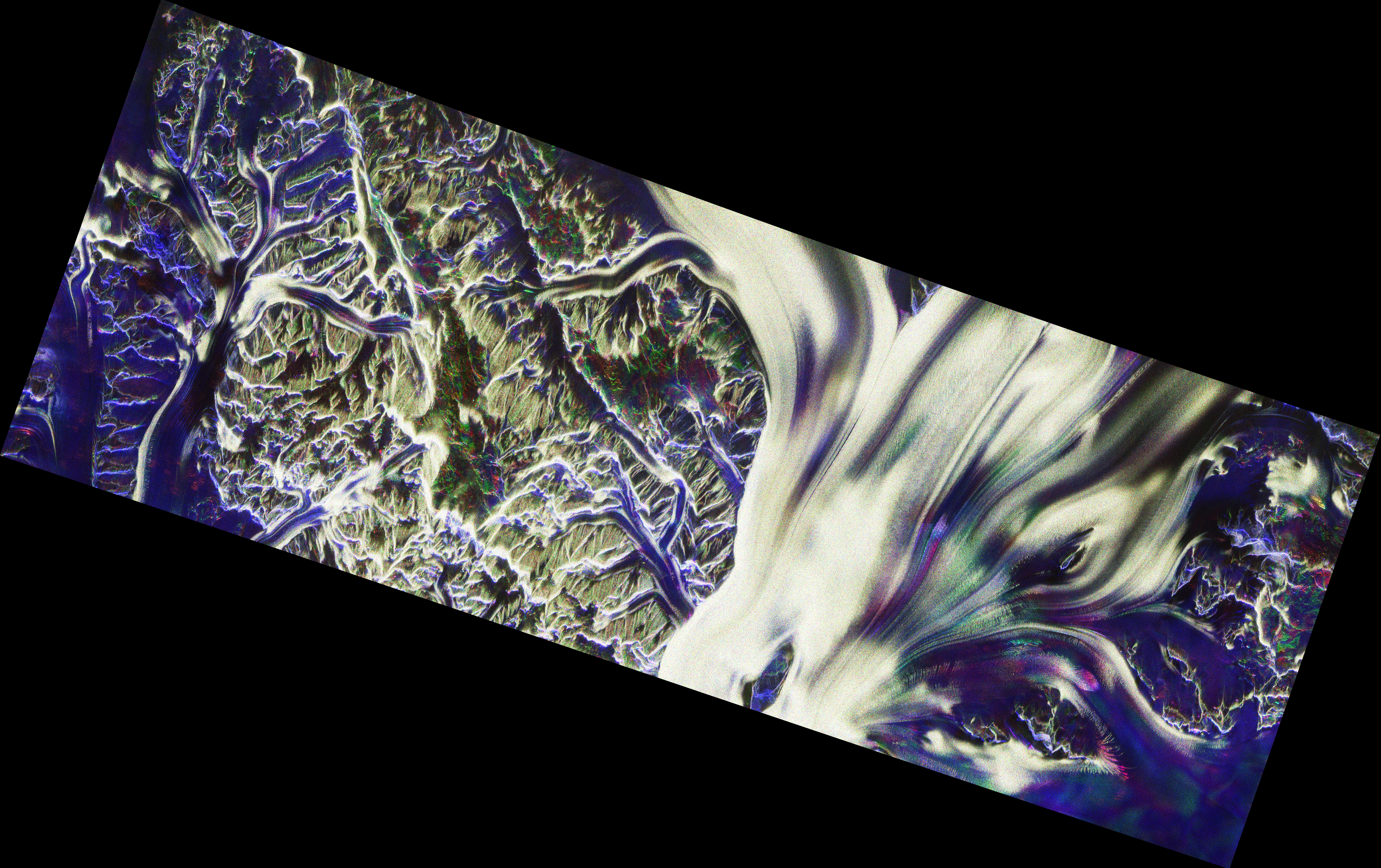
A portion of the vast Transantarctic Mountains in Antarctica with the Nimrod Glacier flowing into Ross Ice Shelf.

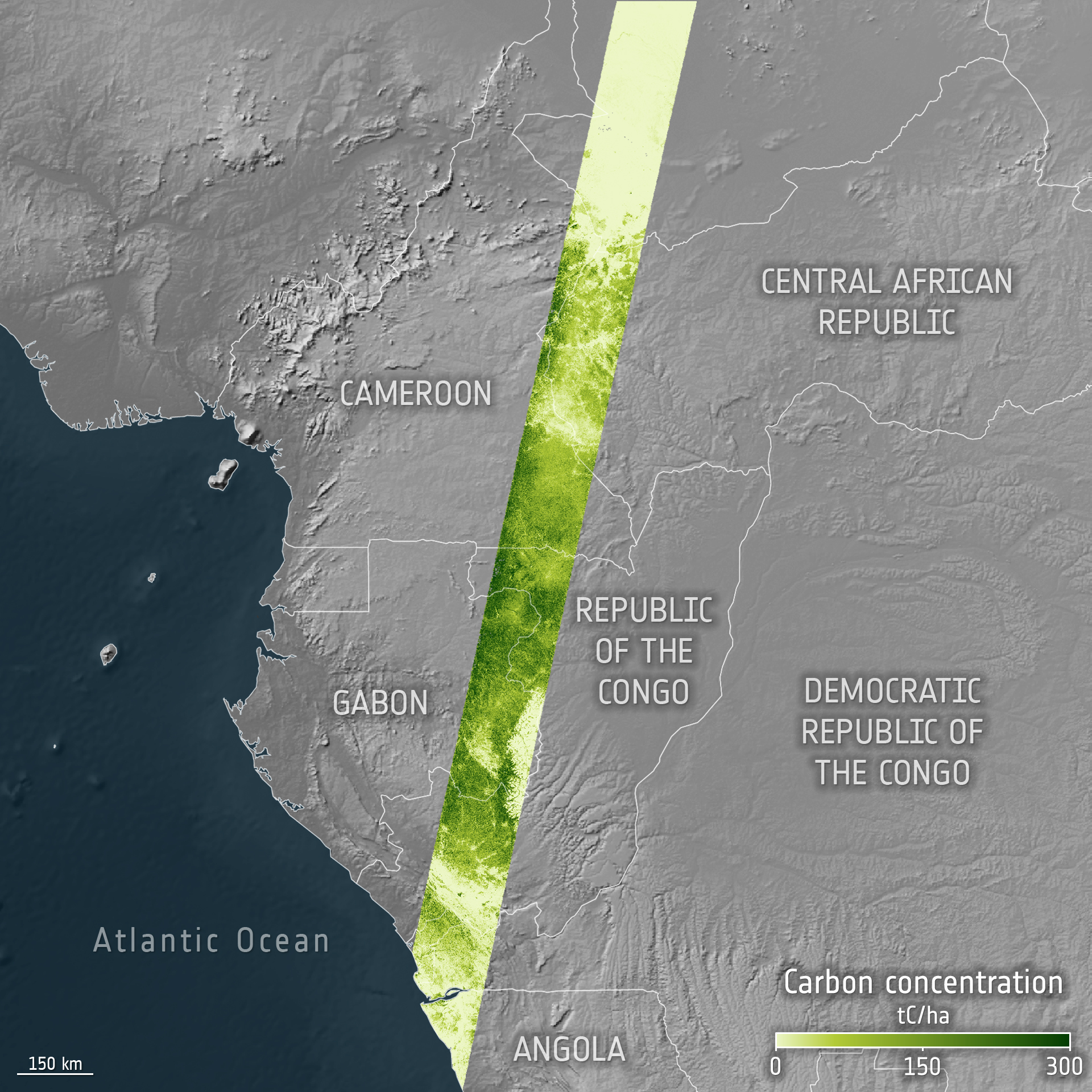
Map of forest carbon from Biomass.

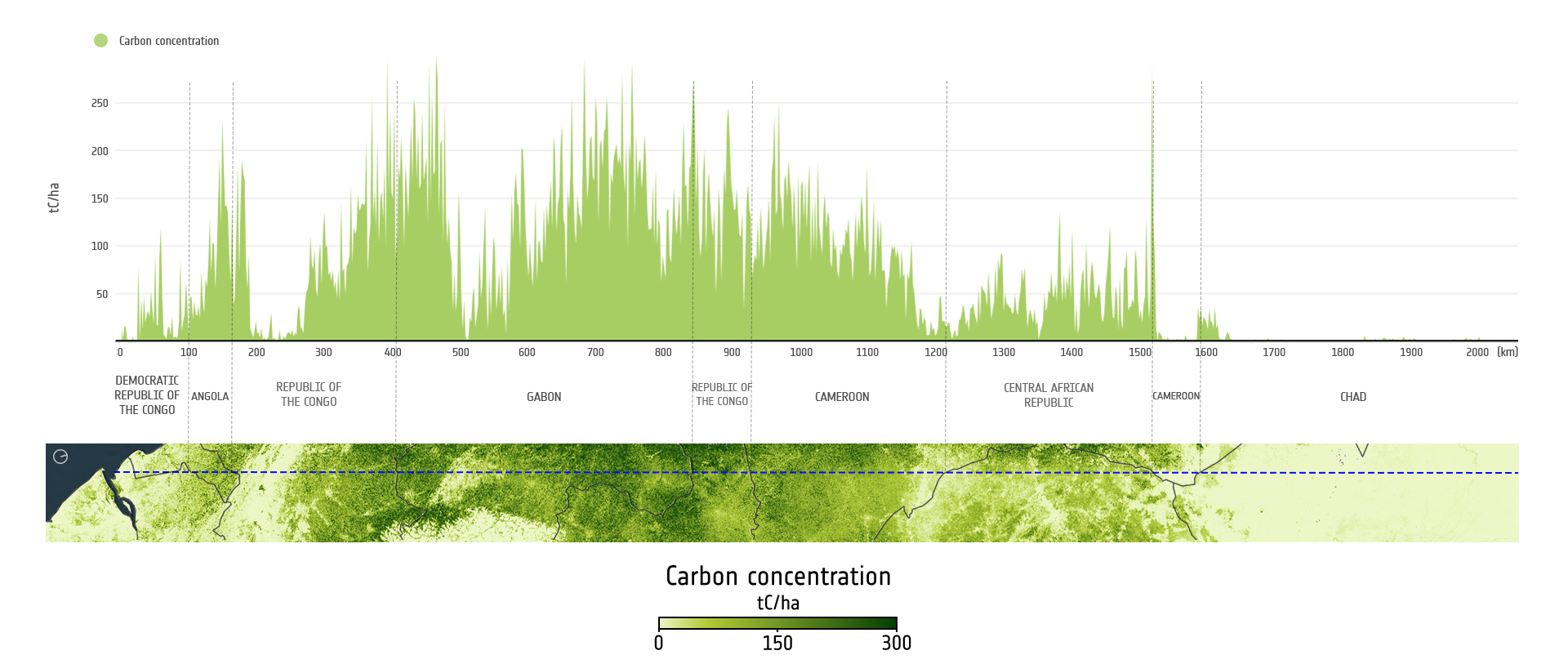
A transect of estimated forest carbon content, in tonnes per hectare, from Gabon to the Central African Republic.

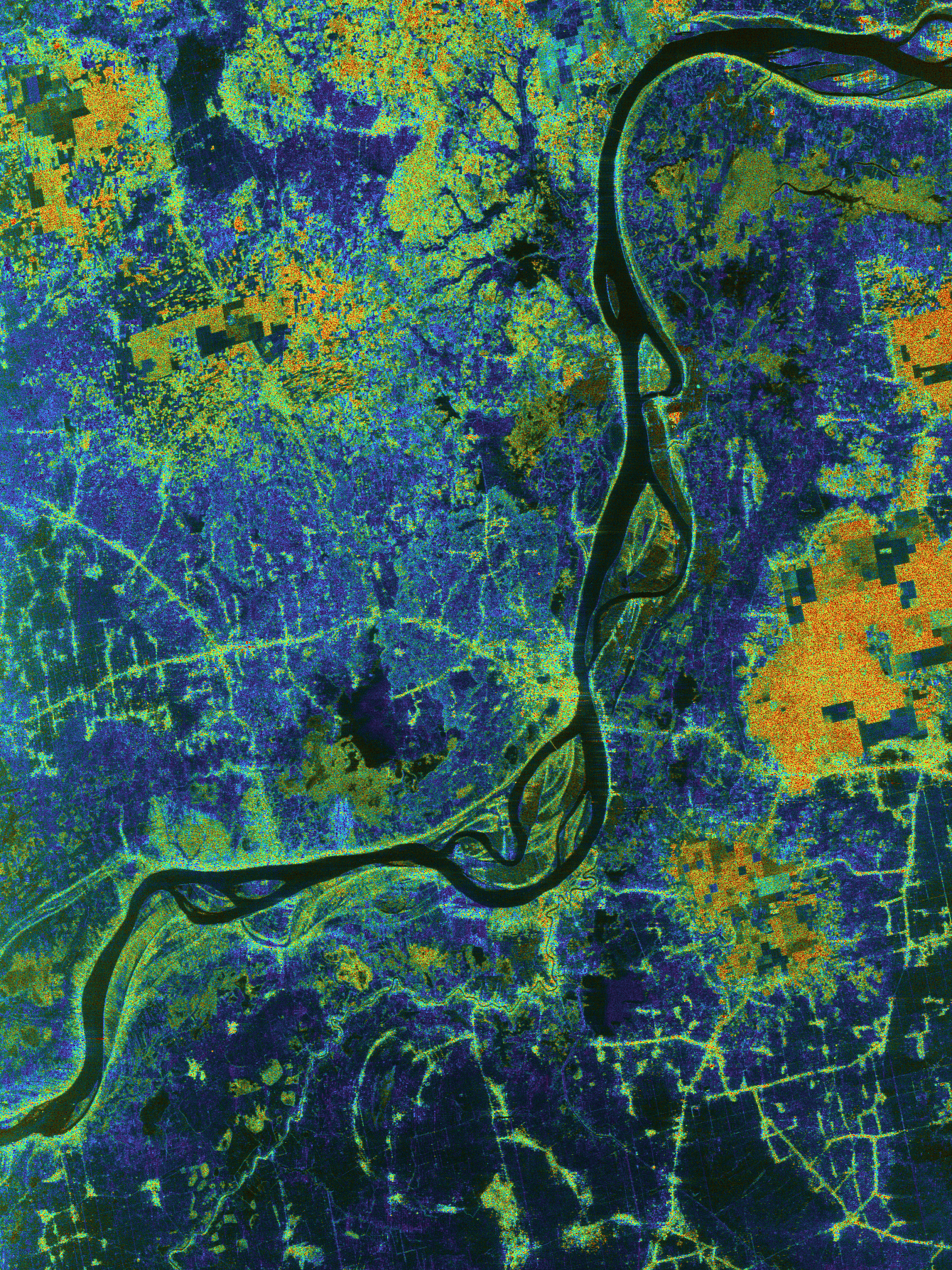
Mekong River, Cambodia

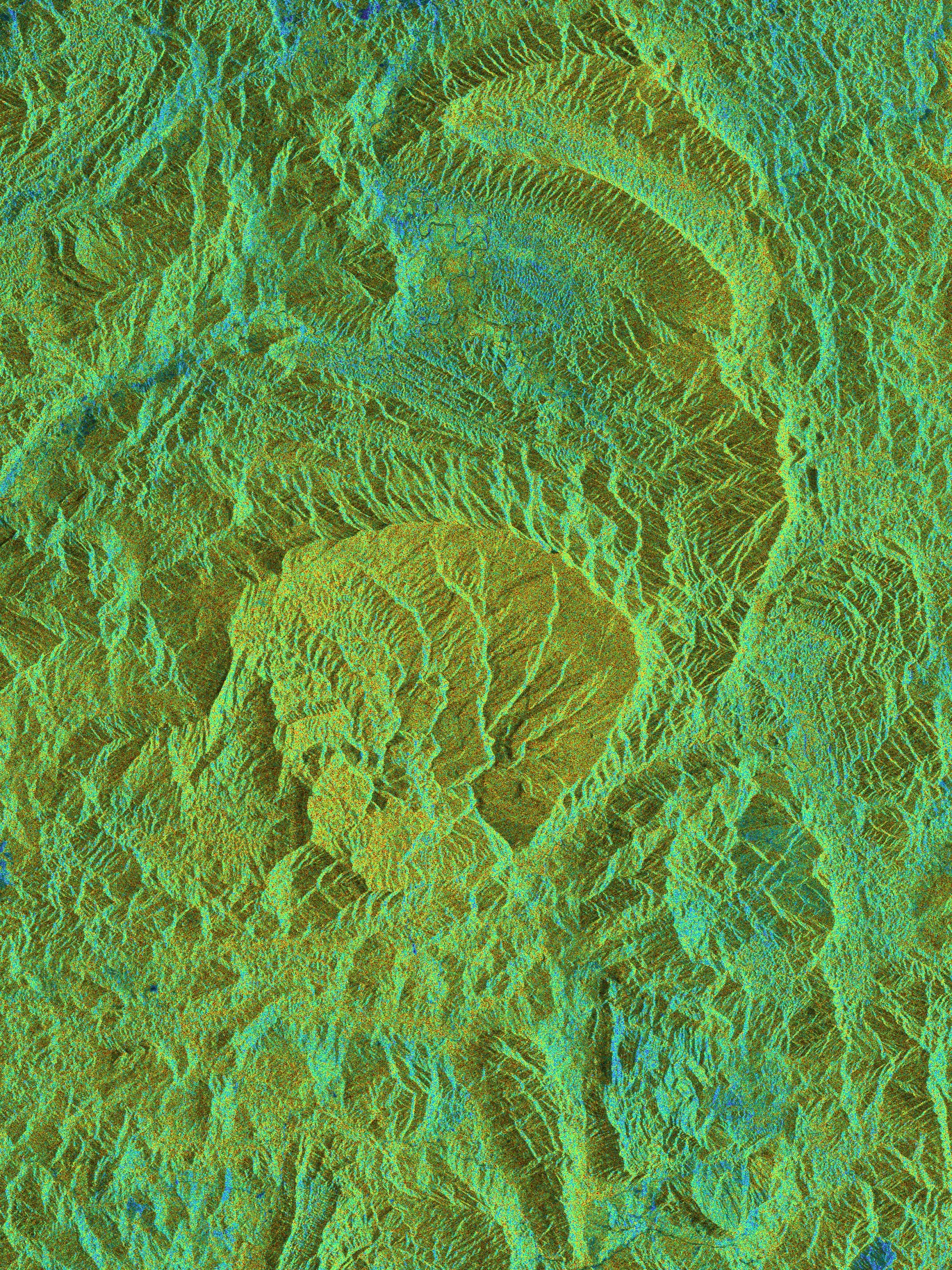
Circular mountain plateau, Malaysia

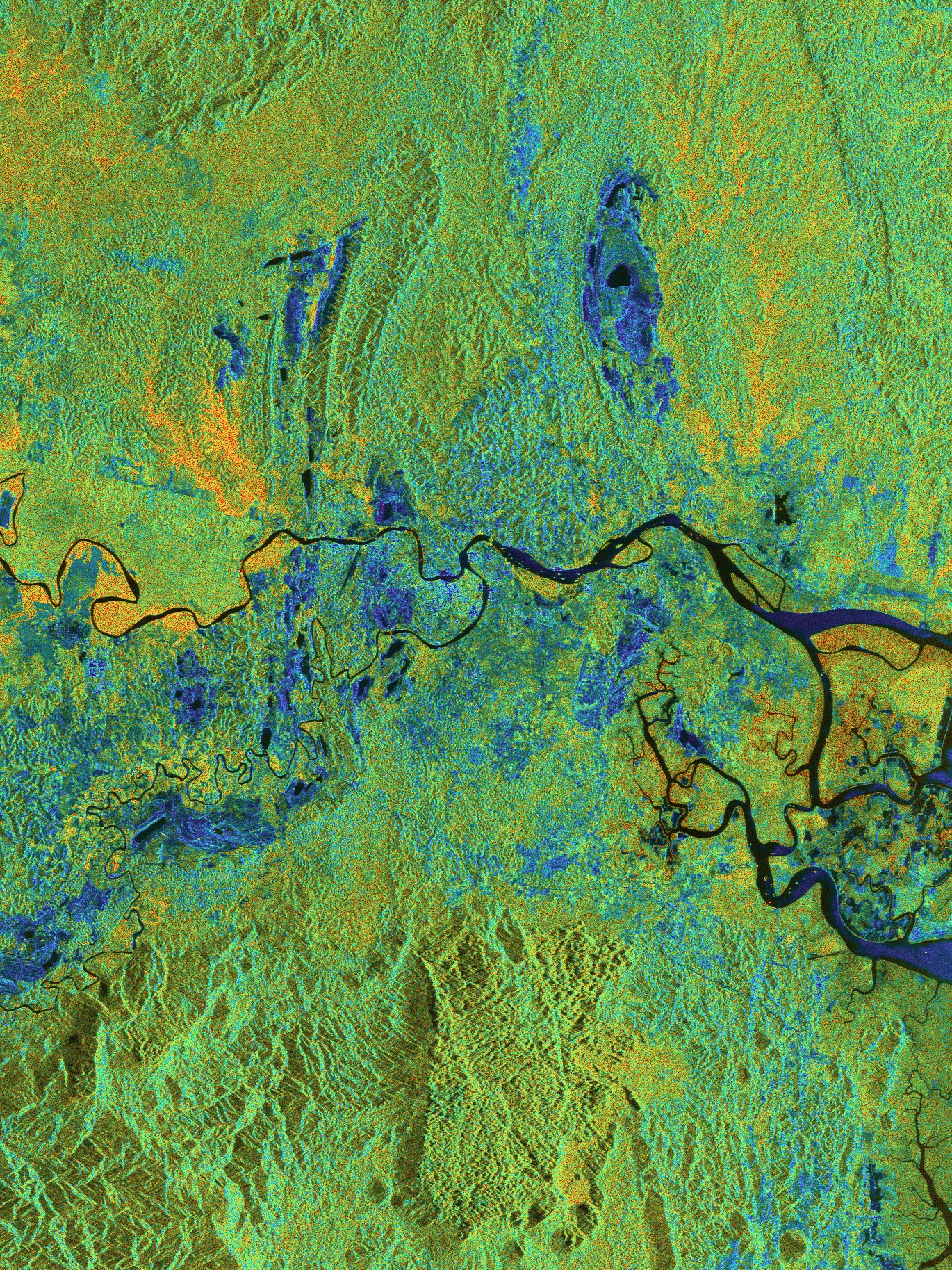
Berau River delta, Indonesia

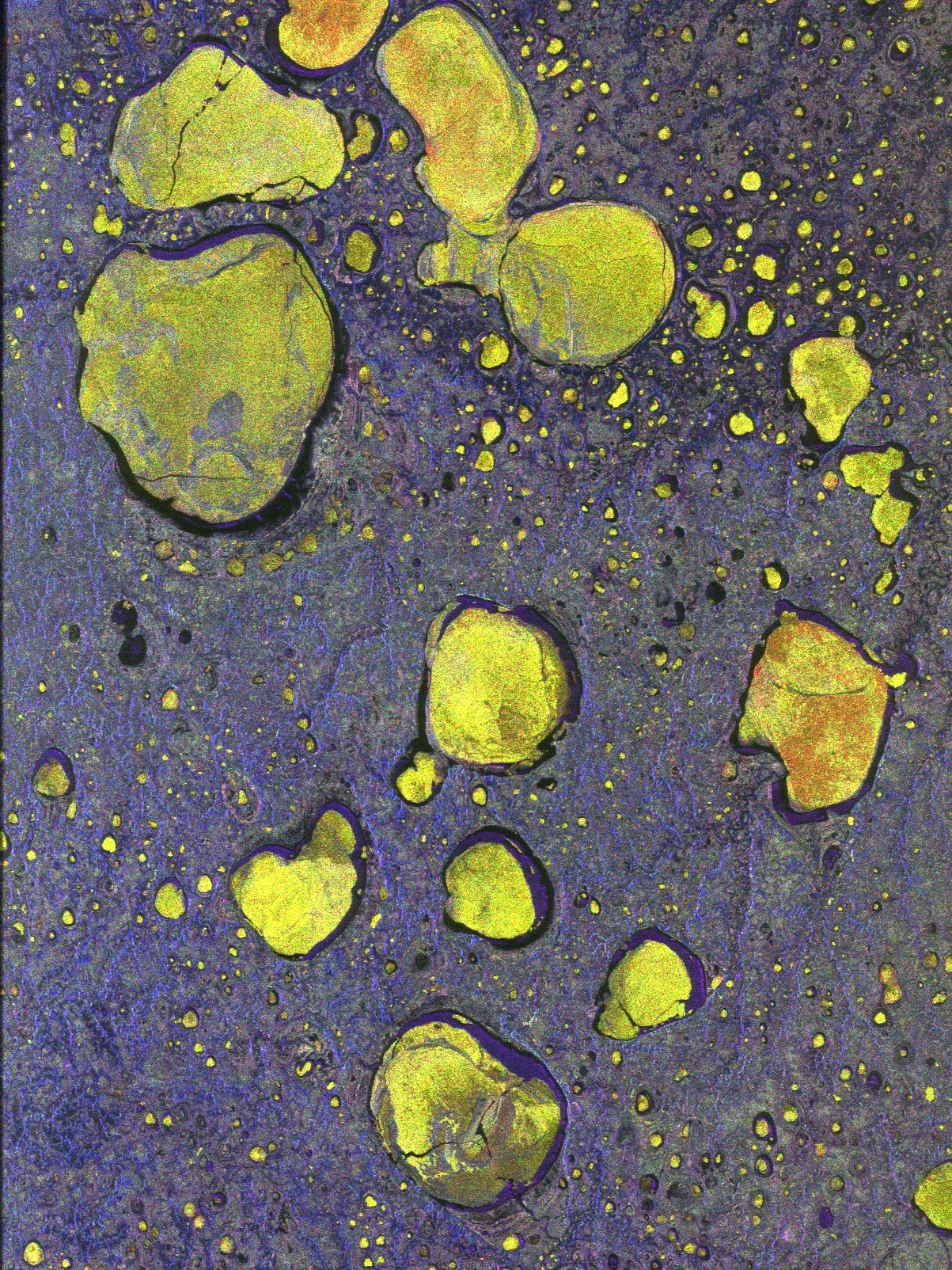
Thermokarst lakes, northern Siberia

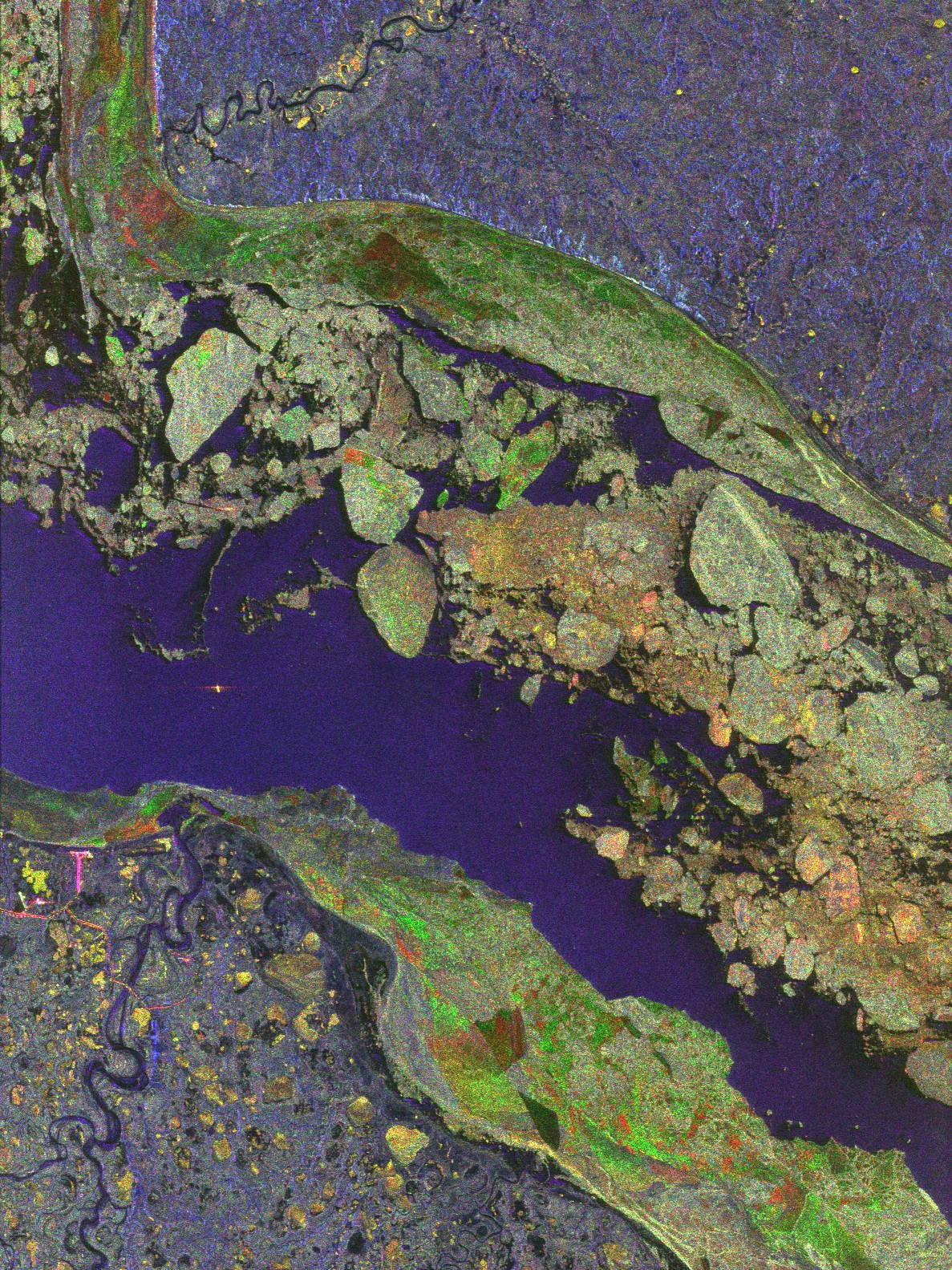
Arctic tundra

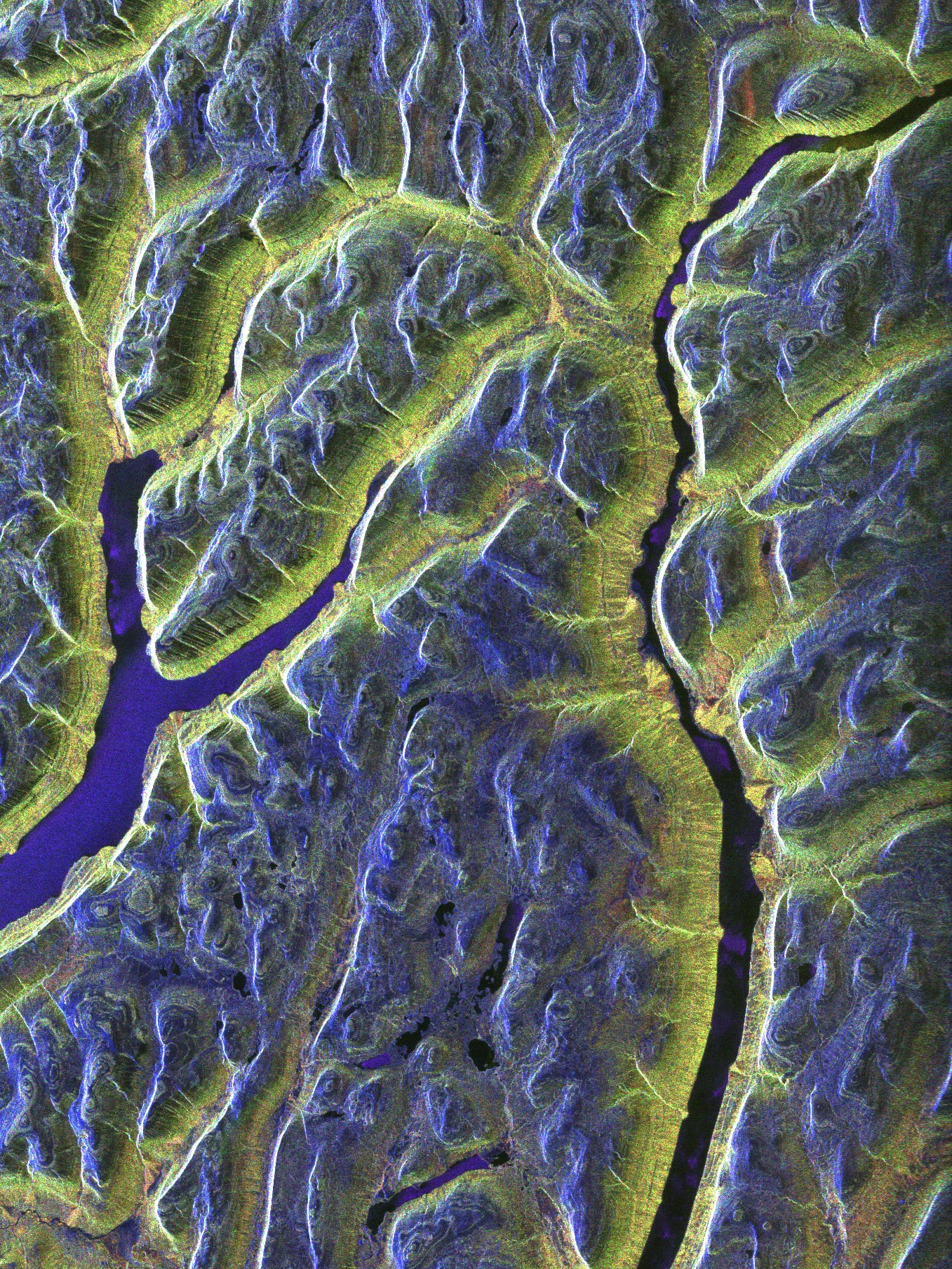
Rugged river canyons, Putorana Plateau

== See also ==
- List of Earth observation satellites
- List of ESA programmes and missions
- FutureEO programme
