= European Astronaut Centre =

ESA field center in Köln, Germany

Coordinates: 50°51′07″N 07°07′52″E

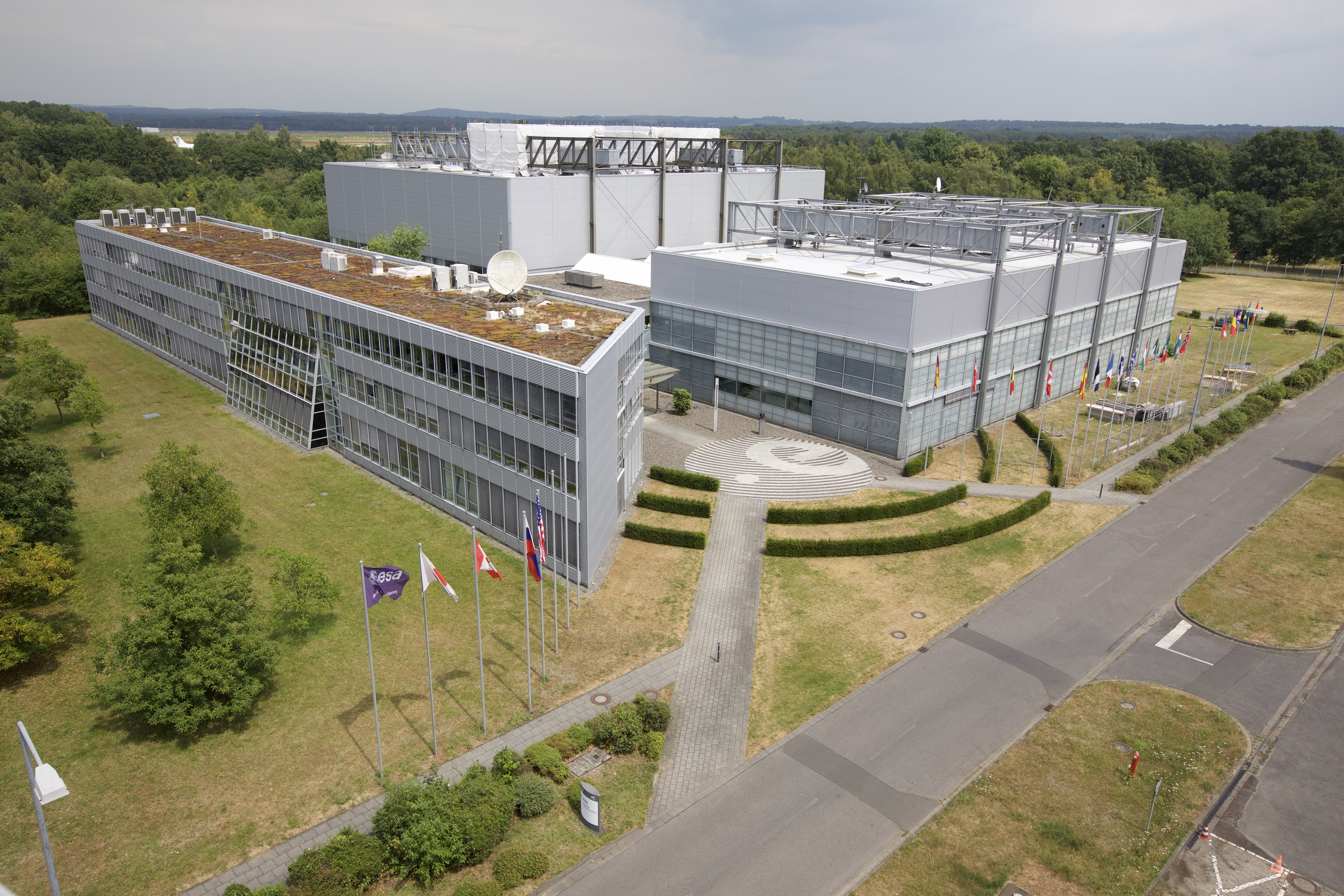
- ESA European Astronaut Centre in Cologne, Germany.

Agency overview
- Abbreviation: EAC
- Type: Space agency
- Owner: European Space Agency
- Website: www.esa.int/eac

The European Astronaut Centre (EAC) (German: Europäisches Astronautenzentrum, French: Centre des astronautes européens) is an establishment of the European Space Agency and home of the European Astronaut Corps. It is located in the southernmost part of Cologne, Germany, and shares the site with the German Aerospace Center DLR. The establishment is subdivided into various organisational units, these being Astronaut Training, Space Medicine, Astronaut Operations & Management, Human Exploration of the Moon as part of the Spaceship EAC initiative and Communications. It provides training facilities for European and international partner astronauts (including a neutral buoyancy pool and gym), particularly regarding ESA hardware for the ISS such as the Columbus ISS module and the future Moon missions training facility LUNA.

The overall European Astronaut Centre organisation is also overseeing the training of European astronauts in centres of other partners, such as the United States (NASA Johnson Space Center), Russia (Star City), Canada (Saint-Hubert) and Japan (Tsukuba).

The Medical Operations arm (the Crew Medical Support Office) concentrates on providing health related support to the European astronauts and their families. Astronaut management supports and directs the careers and mission placements of the astronauts. The Communication Department is in charge of general public and media relations as well as the European astronauts' activities regarding other public or institutional stakeholders. EAC is also the location of ESA's Chief Exploration Scientist.

== See also ==
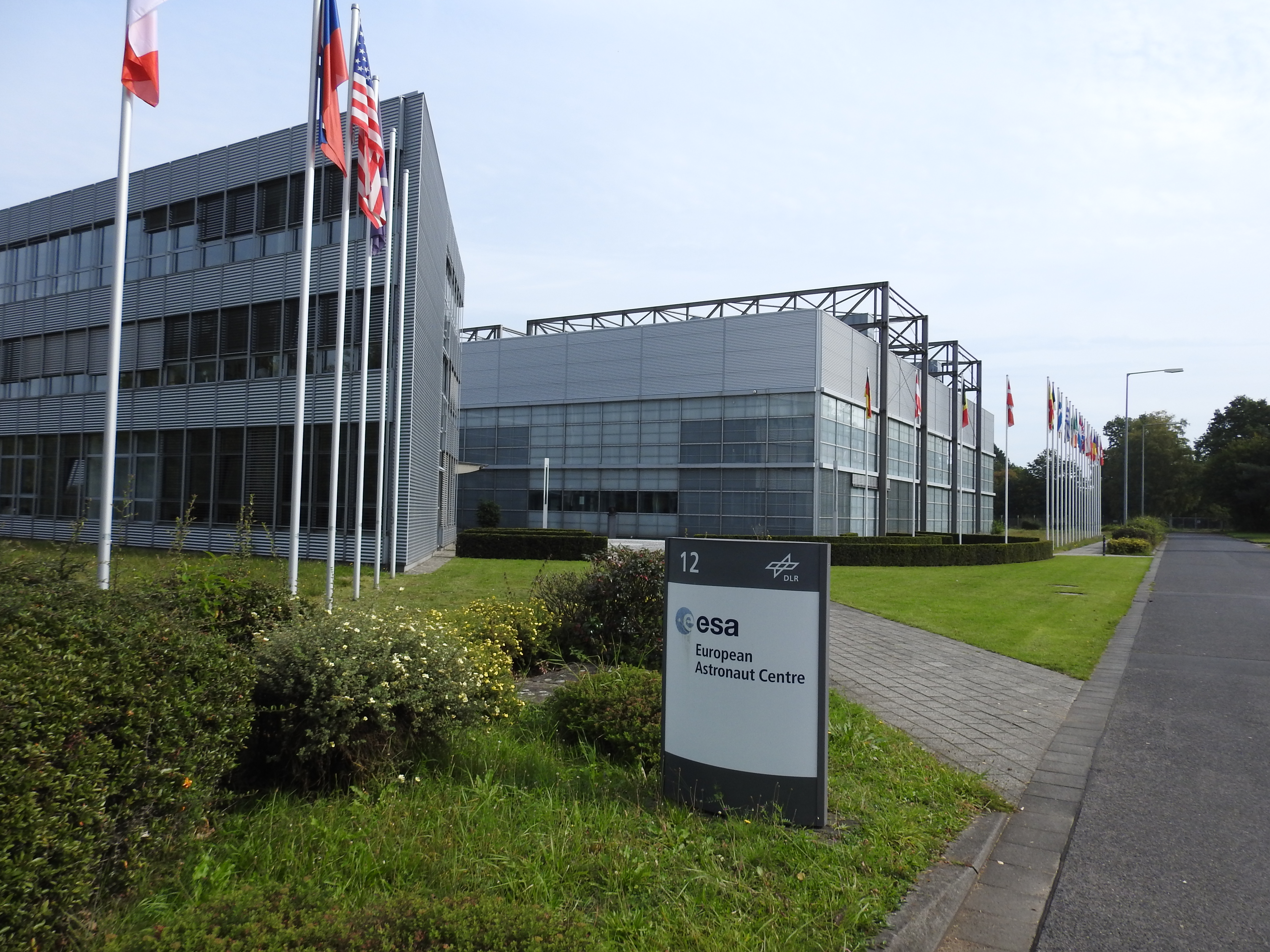
EAC ground view

- ESA Centre for Earth Observation (ESRIN)
- European Centre for Space Applications and Telecommunications (ECSAT)
- European Space Agency (ESA)
- European Space Astronomy Centre (ESAC)
- European Space Operations Centre (ESOC)
- European Space Research and Technology Centre (ESTEC)
- European Space Tracking Network (ESTRACK)
- Guiana Space Centre (CSG)
- Johnson Space Center – equivalent astronaut training centre in the United States
- Yuri Gagarin Cosmonaut Training Center – equivalent cosmonaut training centre in Russia
