= Maspalomas Station =

Radio antenna ground station in Spain

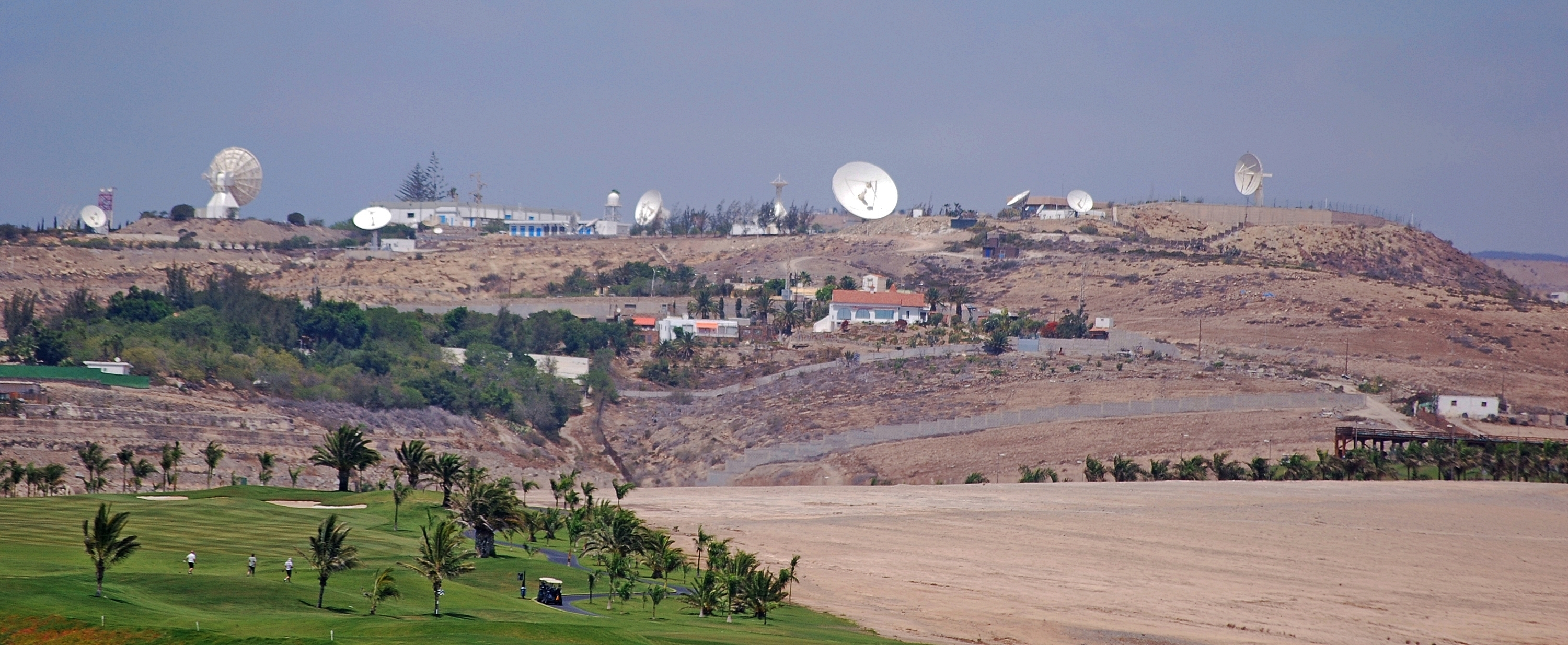

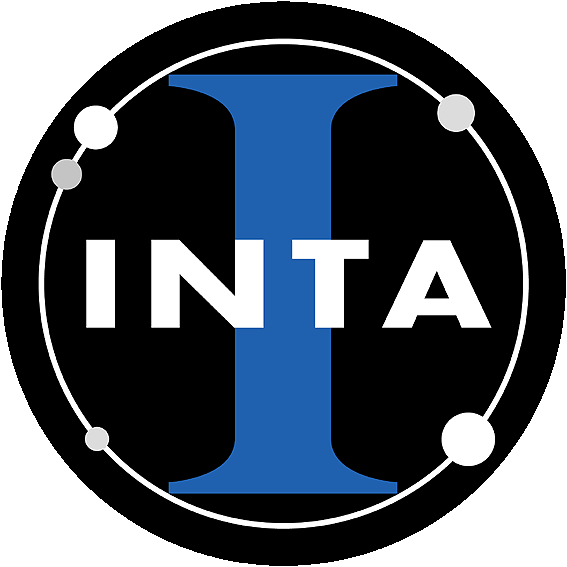
- Alternative names: Centro Espacial de Canarias
- Named after: Maspalomas
- Organization: INTA (Spain)
- Location: San Bartolomé de Tirajana, Province of Las Palmas, Canary Islands, Spain
- Coordinates: 27°45′48″N 15°38′01″W
- Altitude: 205 m (673 ft)
- Website: www.inta.es
- Location within Canary Islands
- Related media on Commons

Maspalomas Station is an INTA-operated, ESTRACK radio antenna ground station for communication with spacecraft located at the southern area of Gran Canaria island, on the INTA campus. It is situated on the Montaña Blanca hill and is visible from the coastal resort of Meloneras, close to Maspalomas. It was originally established in the 1960s to support NASA's nascent human spaceflight program.

== History ==
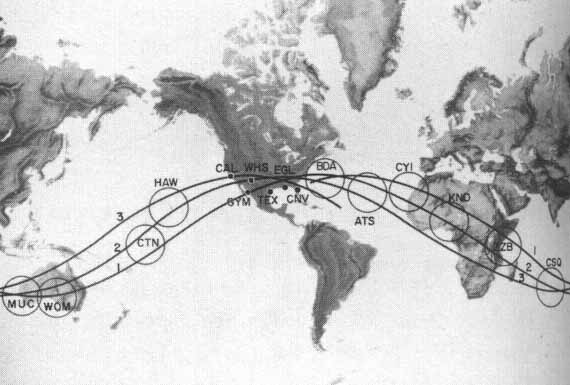
Map of 14 MSFN Earth stations for the Mercury Program (CYI is short for Canary Islands)

From the 1950s the momentum was growing in the Space Race to develop spaceflight. A need arose for an international network of tracking stations around the globe to communicate with satellites and crewed space capsules and to control their flight trajectory. On 18 March 1960, the Spanish and US Governments signed an agreement to establish a NASA satellite ground station on Gran Canaria, the first in Spain. The location was chosen because Maspalomas is on the same latitude as Cape Canaveral Space Force Station, with the two locations separated only by the Atlantic Ocean.

The original Maspalomas Station was built by NASA close to the Maspalomas Lighthouse in 1960. It was initially set to provide support for NASA's first human spaceflight mission, the Mercury Program, one of 14 such stations in the Manned Space Flight Network (MSFN) distributed around the globe. It came into operation on 13 September 1961 to support the Mercury-Atlas 4 test flight, and continued to take part in Mercury missions, including John Glenn’s Mercury-Atlas 6 Earth orbit. Subsequently, Maspalomas participated in the ground control network for NASA's crewed flight programme Project Gemini (1965-1966).

The expansion of tourism in the southern part of Gran Canaria threatened the radio quiet zone around Maspalomas station. NASA agreed with INTA and the Spanish Government to move operations to a new, more remote site several kilometres away from the original site. The new ground station retained the name of Maspalomas.

Maspalomas Station continued to provide support for international space missions, including the launch of early communications satellites by Intelsat, who named their third satellite, Intelsat II F-3, Canary Bird after the Canary Islands.

=== Apollo program ===
Footage of communication with Apollo 11 relayed through Canary Station. The audio starts at about 17 minutes into the flight.

Maspalomas Station supported a number of prominent NASA missions, including the Apollo program, the Apollo–Soyuz Test Project and the Skylab space station. For the Apollo 11 mission that landed the first humans on Moon in July 1969, Maspalomas Station acted as one of the receiving station for transmissions from the Apollo crew and relayed them to Houston using an analog link via London. On 16 July, at about sixteen and half minutes into the flight, the station in the Canary Islands acquired a signal from Apollo 11 for several minutes after the loss of signal to the USNS Vanguard positioned in the Atlantic Ocean. Because of its location, Maspalomas was the first ground station to make contact with Apollo spacecraft once they entered orbit.

During the Moon landing on 20 July, Maspalomas provided the real-time backup for the MSFN station at the former Fresnedillas Station, Madrid (now the Madrid Deep Space Communications Complex) while the Apollo 11 crew made their first steps onto the Moon.

In October 1969, in recognition of the role played by Maspalomas Station, the Apollo 11 crew visited Gran Canaria as part of their 38-day world tour and stayed at the newly built Oasis Hotel in Maspalomas.

=== Later missions ===
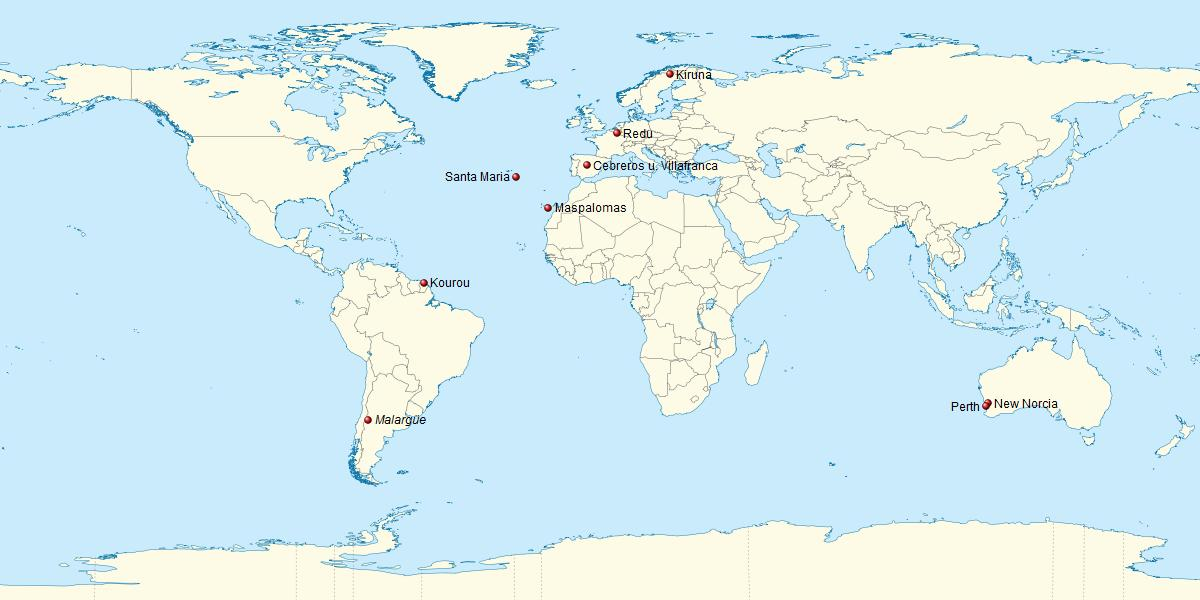
map of ESTRACK ground stations

After the Apollo Missions, Maspalomas supported a number of other important NASA projects, including the monitoring of the Apollo Lunar Surface Experiments Package (ALSEP), a set of scientific instruments left by astronauts at the various Apollo landing sites, and the Skylab missions. In 1975, after the end of the Skylab 4 and the Apollo–Soyuz missions, NASA decommissioned Maspalomas Station and most of the functions were transferred to Madrid. Equipment from Maspalomas Station was sent over to the NASA station at Antananarivo, on Madagascar (part of the Spacecraft Tracking and Data Acquisition Network).

In the late 1970s and early 1980s, ESA began to expand operations in Spain, establishing the Villafranca Station in 1978. Maspalomas Station was reopened in 1979 by the Comisión Nacional de Investigación del Espacio and INTA to provide services for ESA and NASDA (now JAXA) and for programmes such as Hispasat, Helios and the International Cospas-Sarsat Programme.

== Facilities ==
Maspalomas Station holds a 15-metre (50 foot) parabolic antenna which receives S- and X-band and transmits in S-band. The site also has satellite tracking, telemetry, telecommand and radiometry facilities.

The station regularly provides support for missions for the European Space Agency (ESA) via the European Space Operations Centre (ESOC) in Darmstadt, Germany, including the Cluster satellite mission, MetOp-2 and the SMART-1 Moon mission.

Maspalomas has also supported other international space projects, among them missions for the European Organisation for the Exploitation of Meteorological Satellites (EUMETSAT) and for the Japanese Aerospace Exploration Agency (JAXA) (including the ETS-VII rendezvous mission); South Korea's Kompsat-2; and the International Satellite System For Search and Rescue, COSPAS-SARSAT.

The facility has been commissioned to support China's forthcoming Chang'e 5 mission to retrieve samples of Moon rock (postponed to 2019).
