= Marco Guglielmi (physicist) =

Italian physicist

Dr. Marco Guglielmi (born December 17, 1954) is an Italian electrical engineer and applied physicist, formerly a staff member of the European Space Agency in the European Space Research and Technology Center (ESTEC), Noordwijk, The Netherlands. He was named Fellow of the Institute of Electrical and Electronics Engineers (IEEE) in 2013, and Life Fellow in 2020.

== Early life and education ==
Marco was born on December 17, 1954, in Rome, Italy. He was educated at the La Sapienza University in Rome, where he received his degree in electronic engineering in 1979. In 1980, he attended the Specialization School in Applied Electromagnetics in the same university. In 1981 he was awarded a Fulbright Scholarship to pursue graduate studies in the United States. In 1982, Marco received a master's degree in electrical engineering from the University of Bridgeport., Bridgeport, Connecticut, USA. In 1982 he enrolled in a PhD program in Electrophysics at the Polytechnic University, Brooklyn, and was awarded his doctorate in 1986.

== Career ==
From 1986 to 1988 Gugliemi was an assistant professor at Polytechnic University, Brooklyn, New York, US. From 1988 to 1989 he was an assistant professor, at the New Jersey Institute of Technology, Newark. From 1989 to 2001 he was a senior microwave devices and technologies engineer, at the European Space Agency (ESA/ESTEC) in Noordwijk, The Netherlands. From 2001 to 2014 he was the head of the Technology Strategy Section, at ESA/ESTEC. In 2014 Guglielmi retired from ESA, and he is now an invited senior researcher, at the Polytechnic University of Valencia, Valencia, Spain, in the group led by Prof. Vicente Boria.

In 2013, Dr. Guglielmi was named Fellow of the Institute of Electrical and Electronics Engineers (IEEE) "for contributions to multimode equivalent network representations and microwave filter design". He was elevated to Life Fellow in 2020. Guglielmi is a member of the IEEE's Microwave Theory and Technology society, and is a member of the TC-5 Filters Committee.
