= Cebreros Station =

ESA spacecraft communication station, Spain

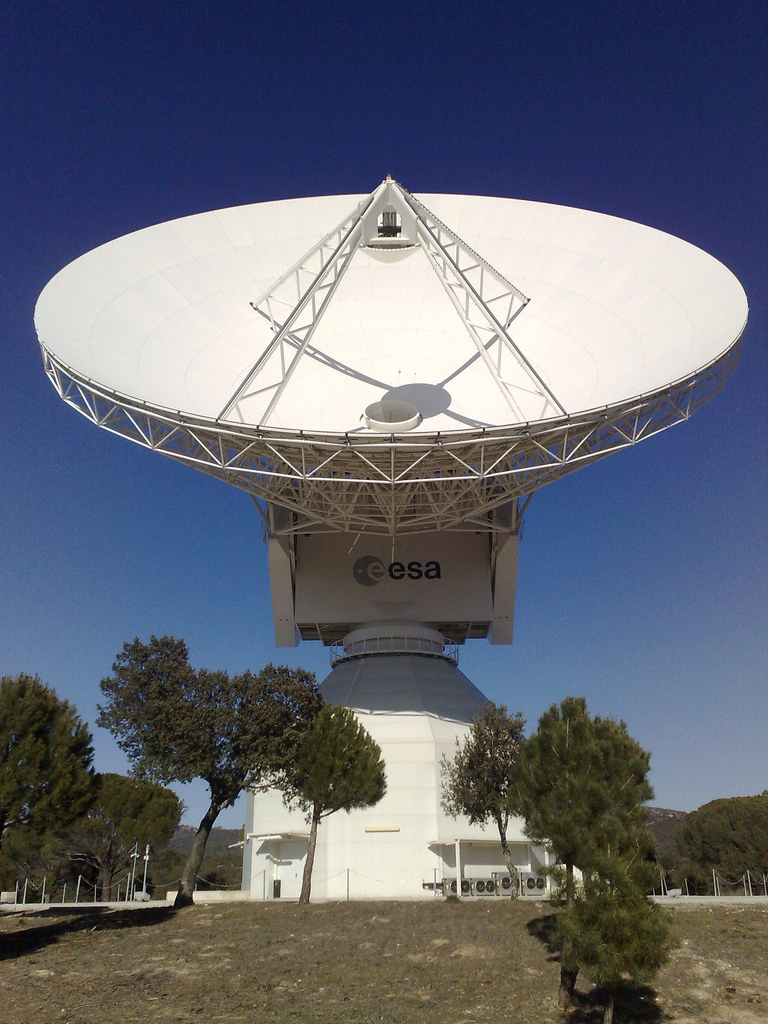
- ESTRACK station at Cebreros, Spain
- Alternative names: DSA 2
- Location(s): Cebreros, Province of Ávila, Castile and León, Spain
- Coordinates: 40°27′10″N 4°22′03″W
- Altitude: 794 m (2,605 ft)
- Diameter: 35 m (114 ft 10 in)
- Website: www.esa.int/Our_Activities/Operations/Estrack/Cebreros_-_DSA_2
- Location of Cebreros Station
- Related media on Commons

Cebreros Station (also known as DSA 2 or Deep Space Antenna 2) is a European Space Agency, ESTRACK radio antenna station for communication with spacecraft, located about 10 km east of Cebreros and 90 km from Madrid, Spain, operated by the European Space Operations Centre and INTA. A 35-metre diameter antenna that receives and transmits in X- and Ka-bands is located at the site. Station code is "CEB". 20 kW CW High Power Amplifier (HPA) it was created by Rheinmetall Italia SpA (Italy). The monitoring and control system was implemented by Microsis srl (Italy).

It provides daily support to Lisa Pathfinder, Mars Express and Gaia.

It also provided support for Rosetta.

Two sister stations are New Norcia Station in Australia, and Malargüe Station in Argentina.

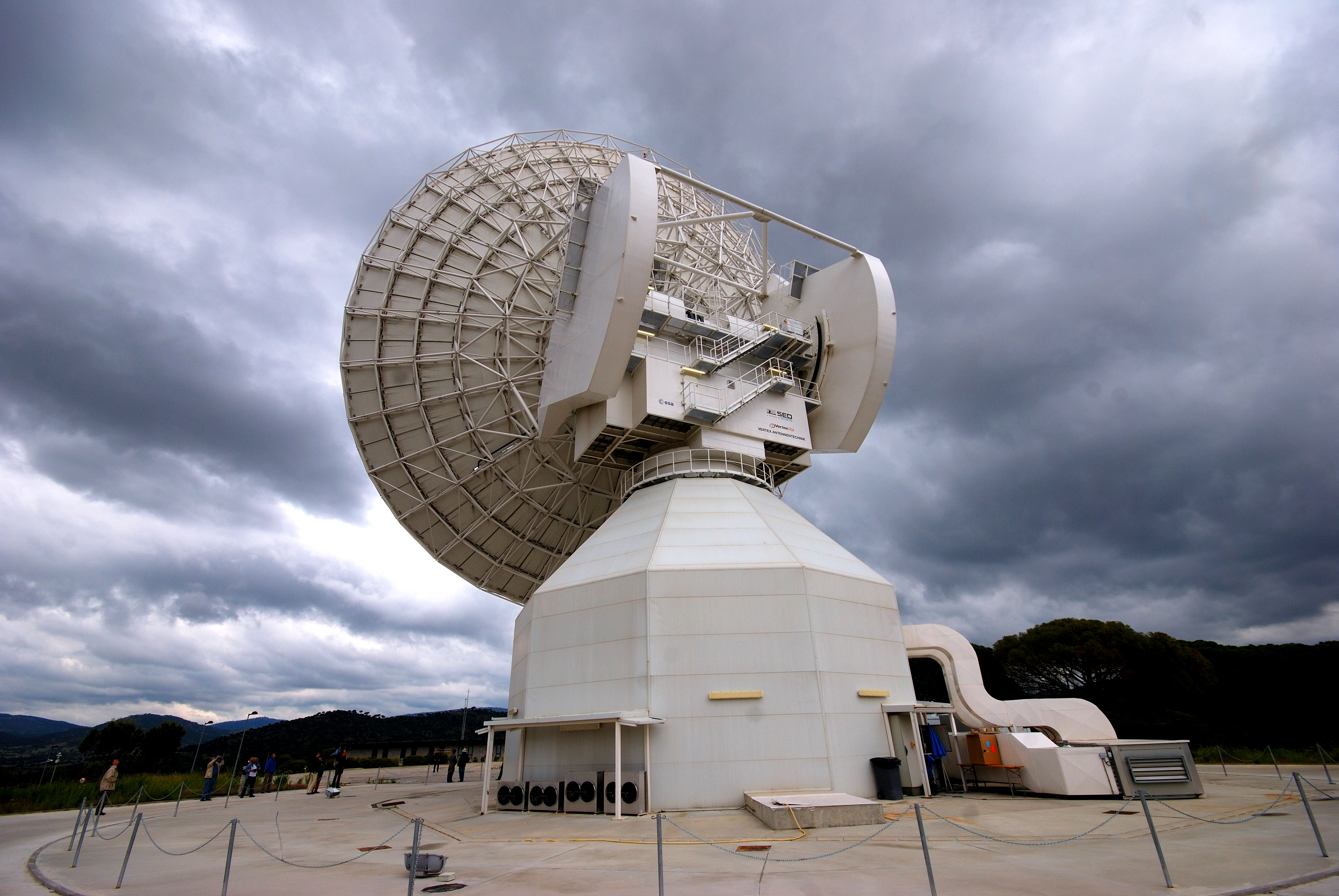
DSA 2 Cebreros

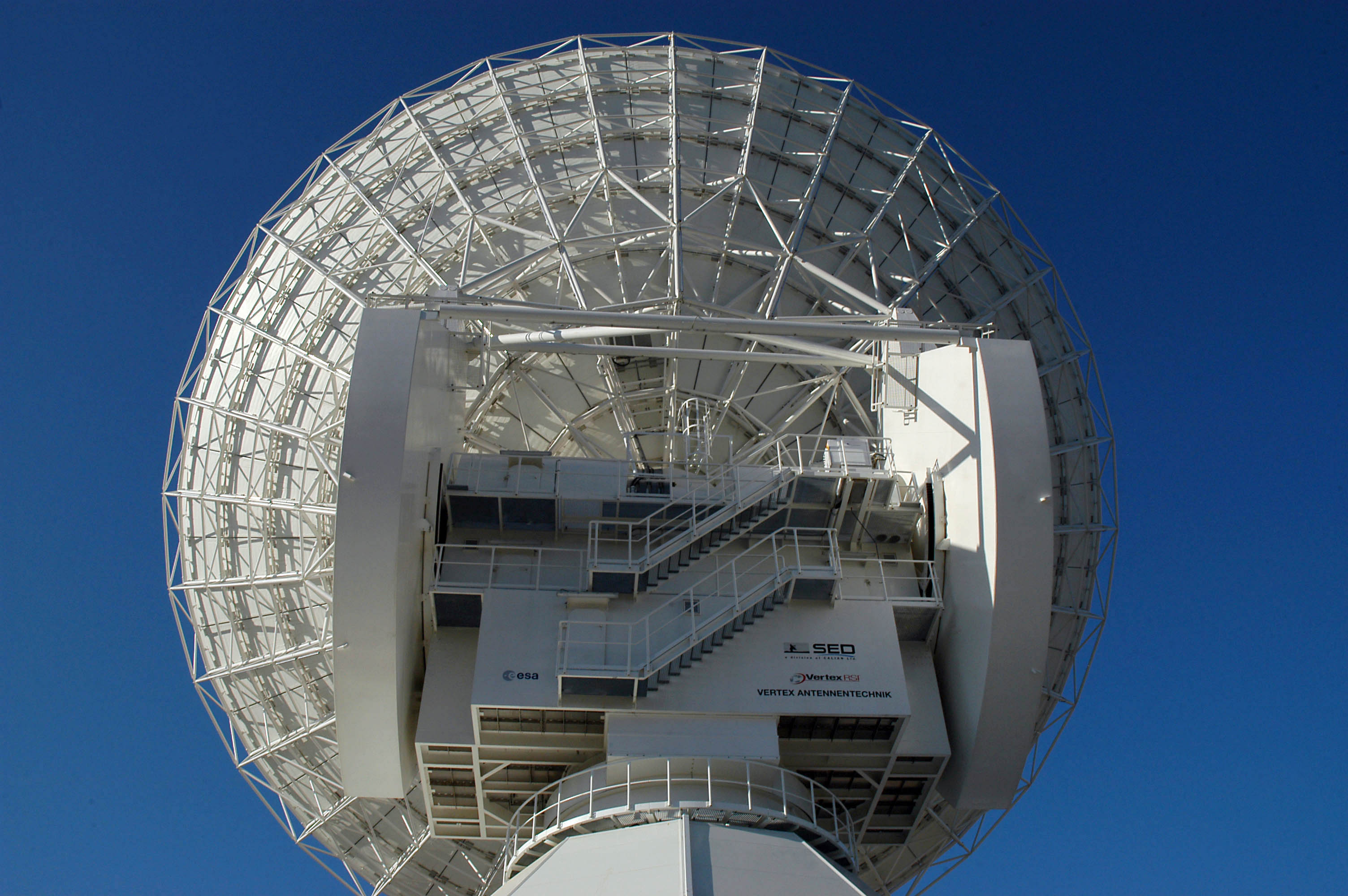
DSA 2 Cebreros

Until 2002, ESA lacked its own means to communicate with spacecraft destined for other planets, or in very distant orbits, and depended on NASA's network of listeners to receive the data collected by them.

== Description ==
The mobile dish of the antenna is 35 metres (115 ft) in diameter. The entire structure measures 40 metres (130 ft) in height and weighs 620 tonnes. The foundations begin at 20 m (66 ft) deep. Much of the machinery responsible for moving the antenna is underground.

It has more data acquisition capacity than the New Norcia antenna, since it receives and transmits information in the Ka band (31.8 - 32.3 GHz) as well as reception in the X band. Its target has an error of only six millidegrees (which is ten times more accurate than the usual monitoring antennas of 15 m (49 ft) in diameter). It has 250 temperature sensors distributed throughout the structure, so that it can auto-adjust automatically in case of expansion and contraction of the material due to meteorological changes. With respect to the New Norcia antenna, it is also faster in azimuth and elevation, and is able to withstand a more intense wind.

Usually, the antenna is operated remotely from the European Space Operations Centre (ESOC) located in Darmstadt (Germany).

== Site ==
The station is located in a very quiet location, surrounded by pine and rockrose. Apart from its privileged situation, the choice fell on Cebreros because it has the necessary geographical coordinates (120 degrees east or west of the New Norcia station in Australia) and the lack of radioelectric interference produced by mobile telephony.

At first, the option of Villafranca del Castillo (Madrid) was considered, where ESA already has the European Space Astronomy Centre (ESAC), but it was discarded due to its accelerated urban development, which would have been, without a doubt, a safe source of interference. Another argument in favour of Cebreros was to have the facilities that NASA used in the 1960s and 1970s to monitor the Apollo spacecraft. NASA abandoned the use of this station in 1983 for budgetary reasons, and ceded the facilities to the Spanish government.

=== July 2026 wildfires ===
On 24 July 2026, the site was affected by the 2026 Spain wildfires. The staff were evacuated when the fire was approaching the site. On 25 July the European Space Agency stated that the fires came very close to the site, but the station appeared to be unharmed, although the site remained inaccessible. Preliminary inspections revealed that no significant damage was caused to either this site or the nearby Madrid Deep Space Communications Complex, though further inspections will be needed to check for less obvious problems.

== Construction ==
The search for the site for the Cebreros station began in April 2002, although construction did not start until January 2003. It lasted a little over two years (it ended in August 2005, and since then it has been running on tests). The construction was the responsibility of a consortium led by the companies SED Systems (Canada) and by Vertex Antennentechnik (Germany). The Spanish companies ESTEYCO and NECSO were responsible for the infrastructure of the antenna tower, while LV Salamanca was responsible for the infrastructure and the remodeling of the building.

The cost of Cebreros station has been about 30 million euros, of which 22 have been for the antenna. The first director was Spanish Valeriano Claros.

== Missions ==
It covered interplanetary missions, such as the Rosetta space probe, sent into space in 2004 to land for the first time on a comet, Churyumov-Gerasimenko, after a ten-year voyage, and the routine operations of the Venus Express mission, and is used currently as support for the Mars Express. The station participates in missions as BepiColombo, Herschel, Planck, LISA Pathfinder, Gaia and Euclid space telescopes.
