= ESA Centre for Earth Observation =

Research centre of the European Space Agency in Frascati, Italy

Coordinates: 41°49′37″N 12°40′27″E

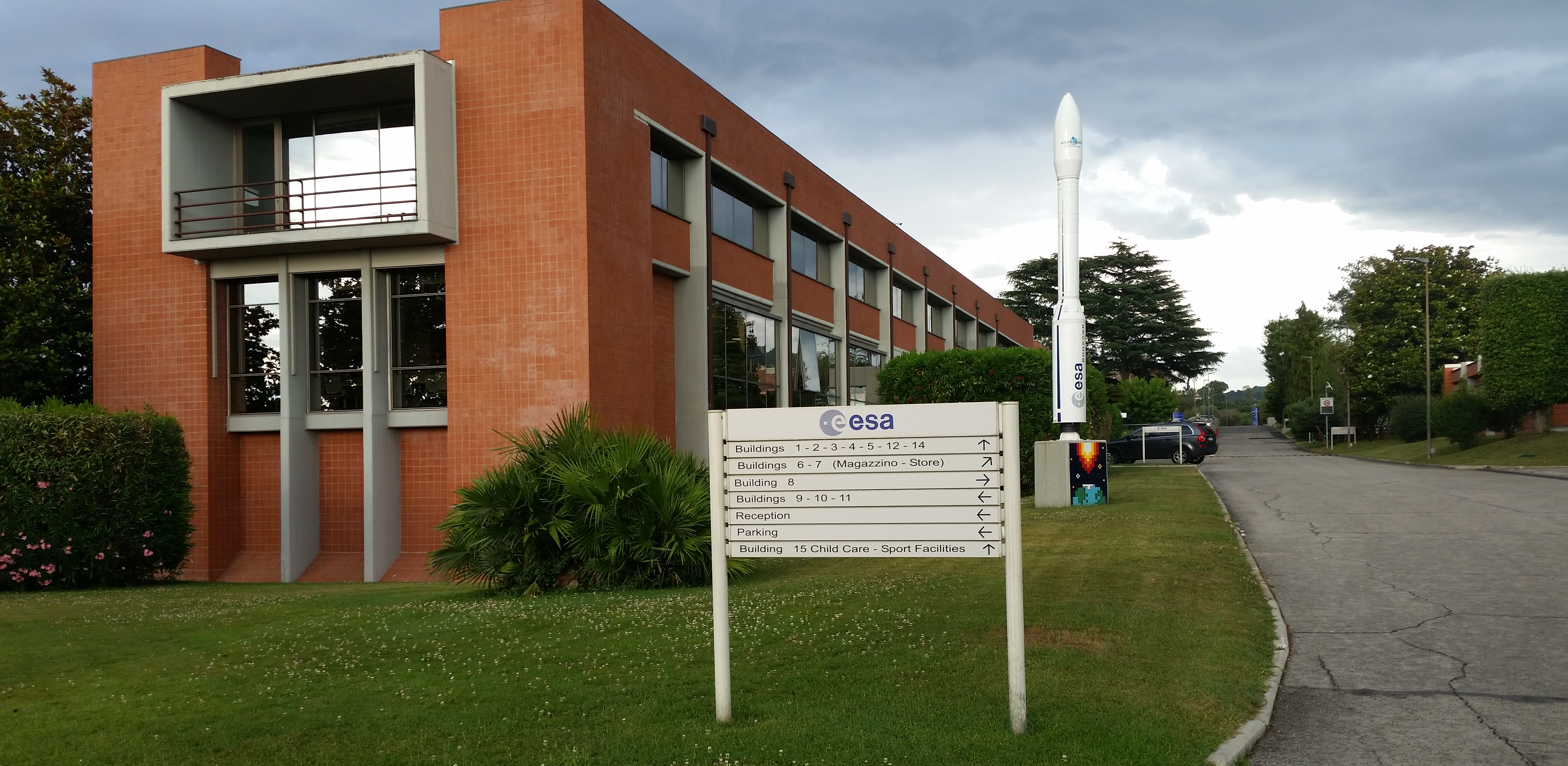
- Inside the ESA Centre for Earth Observation, with a Vega rocket model
- Abbreviation: ESRIN
- Location: Frascati, Italy
- Parent organization: European Space Agency
- Website: www.esa.int/About_Us/ESRIN

The ESA Centre for Earth Observation (also known as the European Space Research Institute or ESRIN) is a research centre belonging to the European Space Agency (ESA), located in Frascati (Rome) Italy. It is dedicated to research involving earth observation data taken from satellites, among other specialised activities. The establishment currently hosts the European Space Agency's development team for the Vega launcher.

== History ==
ESLAR, a laboratory for advanced research was created in 1966 mainly to break the political deadlock over the location of ESLAB. Later renamed ESRIN, an acronym for European Space Research Institute, ESLAR was based in Frascati (Italy). The ESRO Convention describes ESRINs' role in the following manner:

...to undertake laboratory and theoretical research in the basic physics and chemistry necessary to the understanding of past and the planning of future experiments in space.

— ESRO Convention

The facility began acquiring data from environmental satellites within Earthnet programme in the 1970s.

== See also ==
- European Astronaut Centre (EAC)
- European Centre for Space Applications and Telecommunications (ECSAT)
- European Space Agency (ESA)
- European Space Astronomy Centre (ESAC)
- European Space Operations Centre (ESOC)
- European Space Research and Technology Centre (ESTEC)
- European Space Tracking Network (ESTRACK)
- Guiana Space Centre (CSG)
