= European Centre for Space Applications and Telecommunications =

European Space Agency technology sub-complex

Coordinates: 51.5761°N 1.3072°W

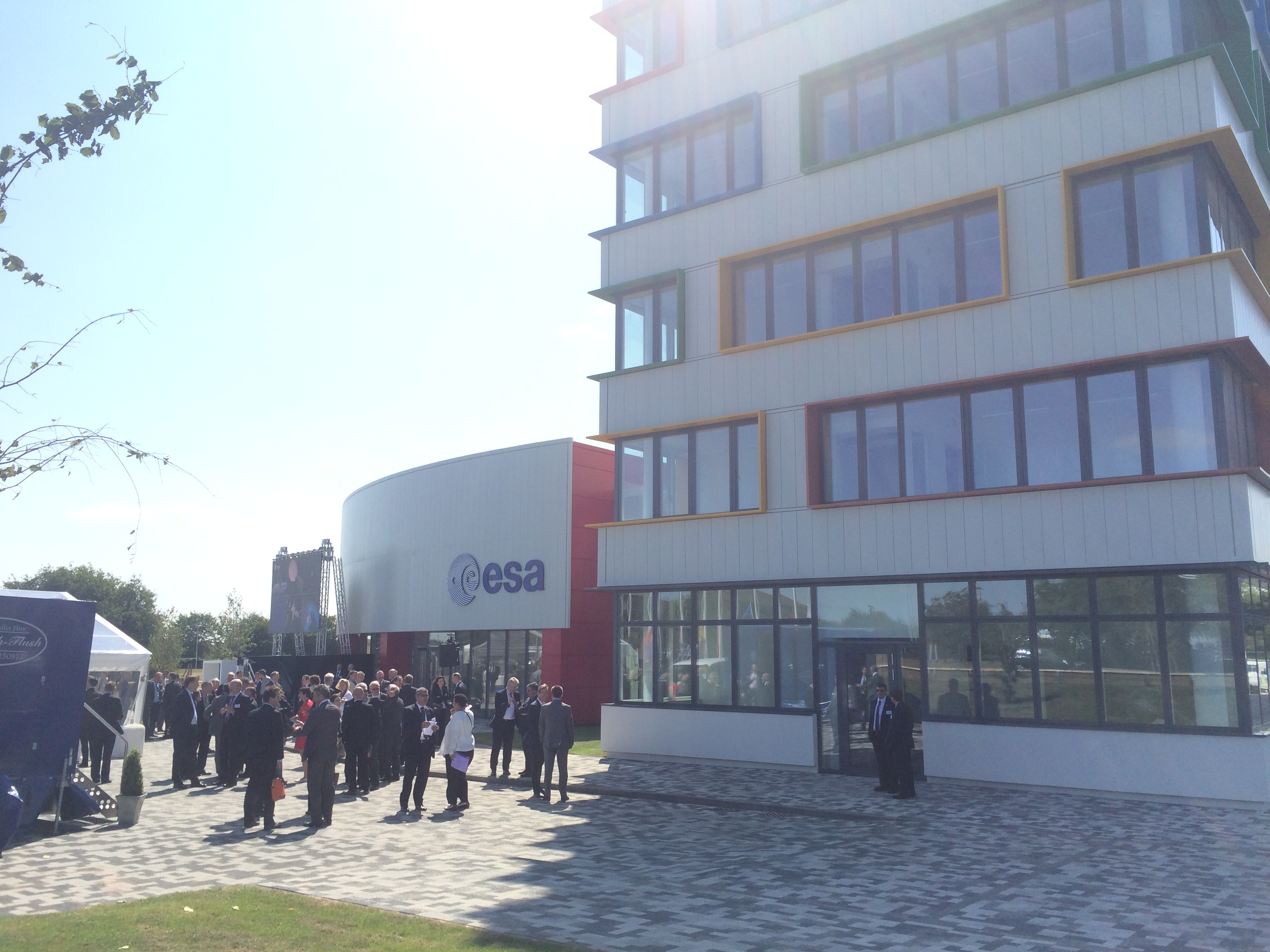
Inauguration of ECSAT's building at Harwell in 2015

The European Centre for Space Applications and Telecommunications or ECSAT is a research centre belonging to the European Space Agency (ESA) and located on the Harwell Science and Innovation Campus in Oxfordshire, United Kingdom.

It was created in 2009 and moved to its present building in 2013. Staff work on activities linking space to telecommunications, integrated applications, climate change, technology and science.

The development of ECSAT was in line with the growing efforts of the United Kingdom in the space sector, including the creation of the UK Space Agency in 2010 and the increase in the economic contribution of that country to ESA. At the same time, ESA benefited from a closer relation with the UK space sector and corrected a historical anomaly whereby the United Kingdom, while being one of the biggest ESA contributors, did not host any of the agency's major centres.

There is an earlier ESA facility on the campus, the ESA Business Incubation Centre (BIC) Harwell, which is intended to assist in the development of technology transfer ideas, helping to transform them into viable businesses.

ECSAT hosts the ESA Climate Office, responsible for defining and implementing ESA's Climate Change Initiative Programme.

== See also ==
- European Space Agency (ESA)
- ESA Centre for Earth Observation (ESRIN)
- European Astronaut Centre (EAC)
- European Space Astronomy Centre (ESAC)
- European Space Operations Centre (ESOC)
- European Space Research and Technology Centre (ESTEC)
- European Space Tracking Network (ESTRACK)
- Guiana Space Centre (CSG)
