= New Norcia Station =

Earth station in Western Australia

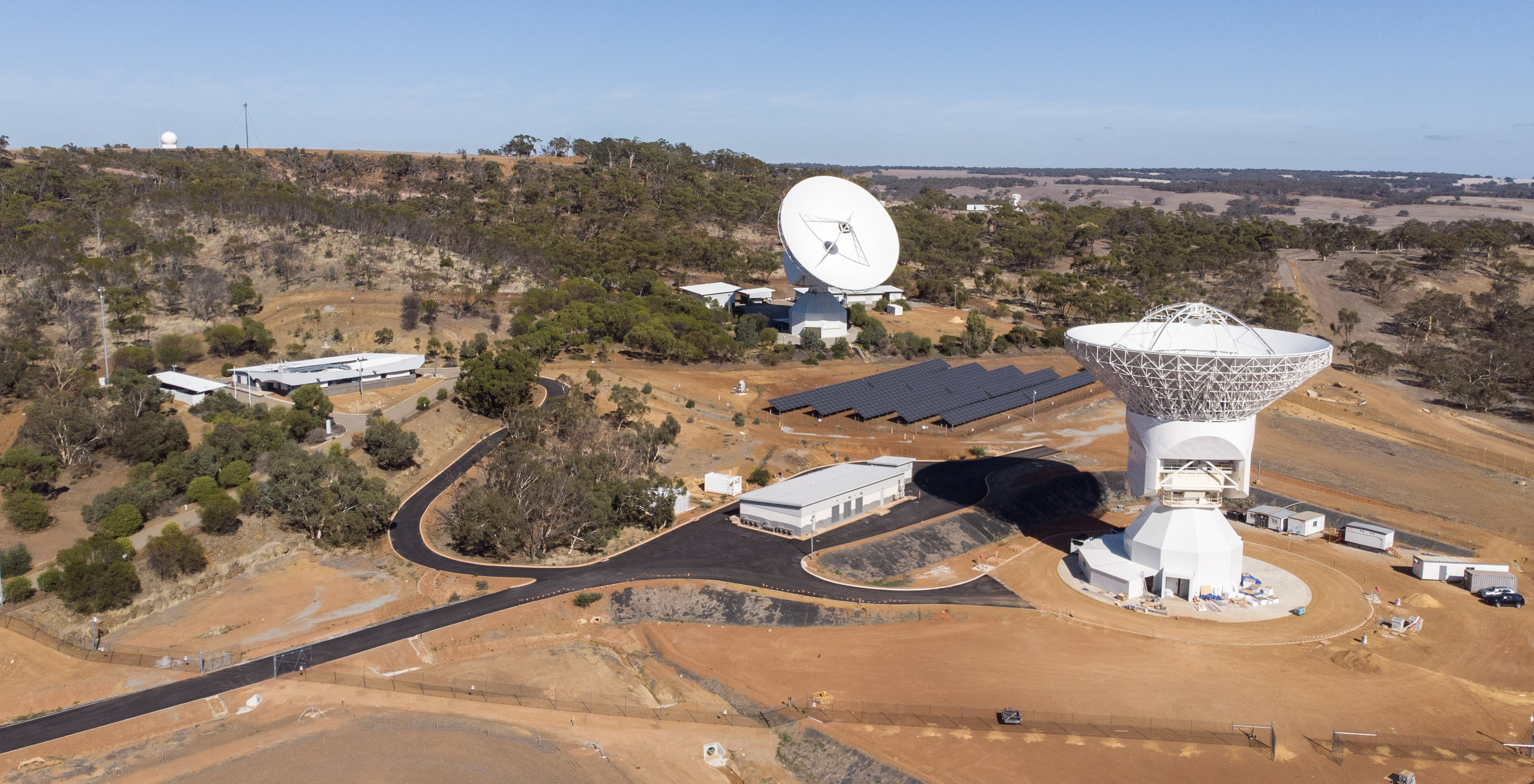
- Alternative names: DSA 1
- Location: Western Australia, AUS
- Coordinates: 31°02′54″S 116°11′28″E
- Altitude: 252 m (827 ft)
- Diameter: 35 m (114 ft 10 in)
- Replaced: Perth Station
- Website: www.esa.int/Our_Activities/Operations/Estrack/New_Norcia_-_DSA_1
- Location within Australia
- Related media on Commons

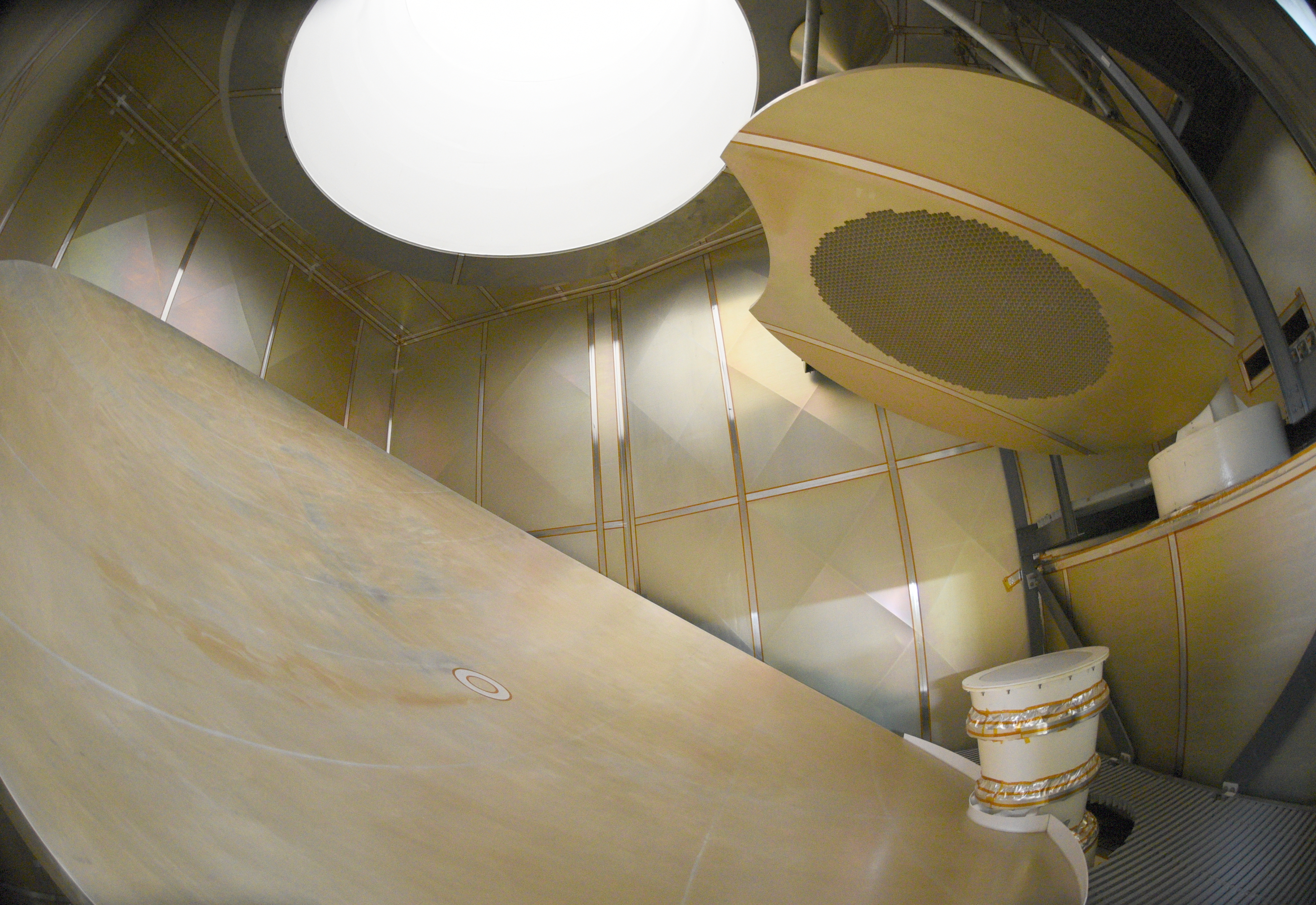
The main mirror, S-band mirror and S-band feed horn inside NNO-1

New Norcia Station (also known as NNO) is an ESTRACK Earth station in Australia for communication with spacecraft after launch, in low Earth orbit, in geostationary orbit and in deep space. It is located 10 kilometres (6.2 mi) south of the town of New Norcia, Western Australia. It was the first ESA deep space ground station, followed by Cebreros Station and Malargüe Station.

New Norcia Station was one of the stations providing communications, tracking and data download from the Rosetta spacecraft. It supports the BepiColombo mission.

== History ==
Construction began in April 2000 and lasted until the end of the first half of 2002. Installation of electronics and communication equipment followed. The station was officially opened on 5 March 2003 by the Premier of Western Australia at the time, Geoff Gallop. Total construction cost was €28 million.

In December 2019, ESA announced plans to build a second 35-metre (115 ft) deep space antenna at New Norcia to provide coverage for upcoming ESA missions, including Solar Orbiter, Hera, and Jupiter Icy Moons Explorer. The antenna entered operation in April 2026.

Since June 2019, operational support and maintenance of the station has been the responsibility of CSIRO.

== NNO-1 ==
The station operates a 35-metre (115 ft) dish designated NNO-1 capable of two-way transmission in both S- and X-bands using 2 and 20-kilowatt transmitters, as well as cryogenic low noise amplifiers for downlink. The antenna weighs over 600 tonnes (1.3 million pounds) and is 40 metres (130 ft) tall. Future upgrade plans include adding a K_{a}-band station to support international missions.

== NNO-2 ==
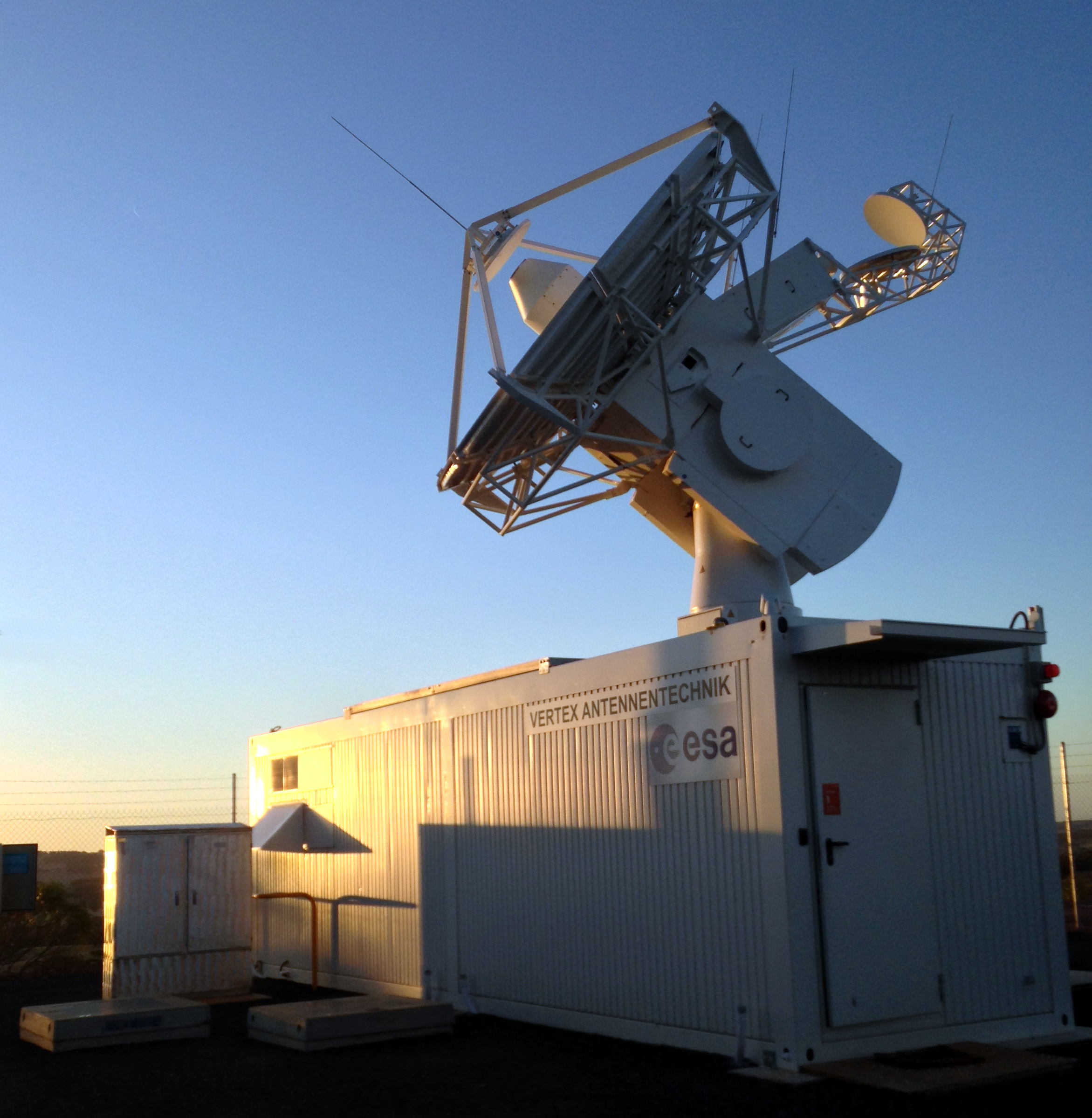
The 4.5-metre (15 ft) NNO-2 dish during its inauguration

A 4.5-metre (15 ft) dish designated NNO-2 was inaugurated on 11 February 2016. NNO-2 acts as an acquisition aid for the 35-metre (115 ft) dish for fast-moving satellites and launch vehicles during their launch and early orbit stage.

The NNO-2 mount is capable of tracking at 20 degrees per second in azimuth and 10 degrees per second in elevation.

The 4.5-metre (15 ft) dish has a half-power beam width of 1.9 degrees at S-band and 0.5 degrees at X-band and can be used to communicate with spacecraft up to 100,000 kilometres (62,000 mi) in altitude. To help in signal acquisition when the spacecraft position is too uncertain, the 4.5-metre (15 ft) dish has a 0.75-metre (2 ft 6 in) dish piggy-backed onto it, with a half-power beam width of 3.5 degrees at X-band. There is no S-band capability on the 0.75-metre (2 ft 6 in) dish.

NNO-2 may also be operated independently of NNO-1, as it commonly does during support activities for launches of Ariane 6 and Vega rockets from the Guiana Space Centre.

== NNO-3 ==
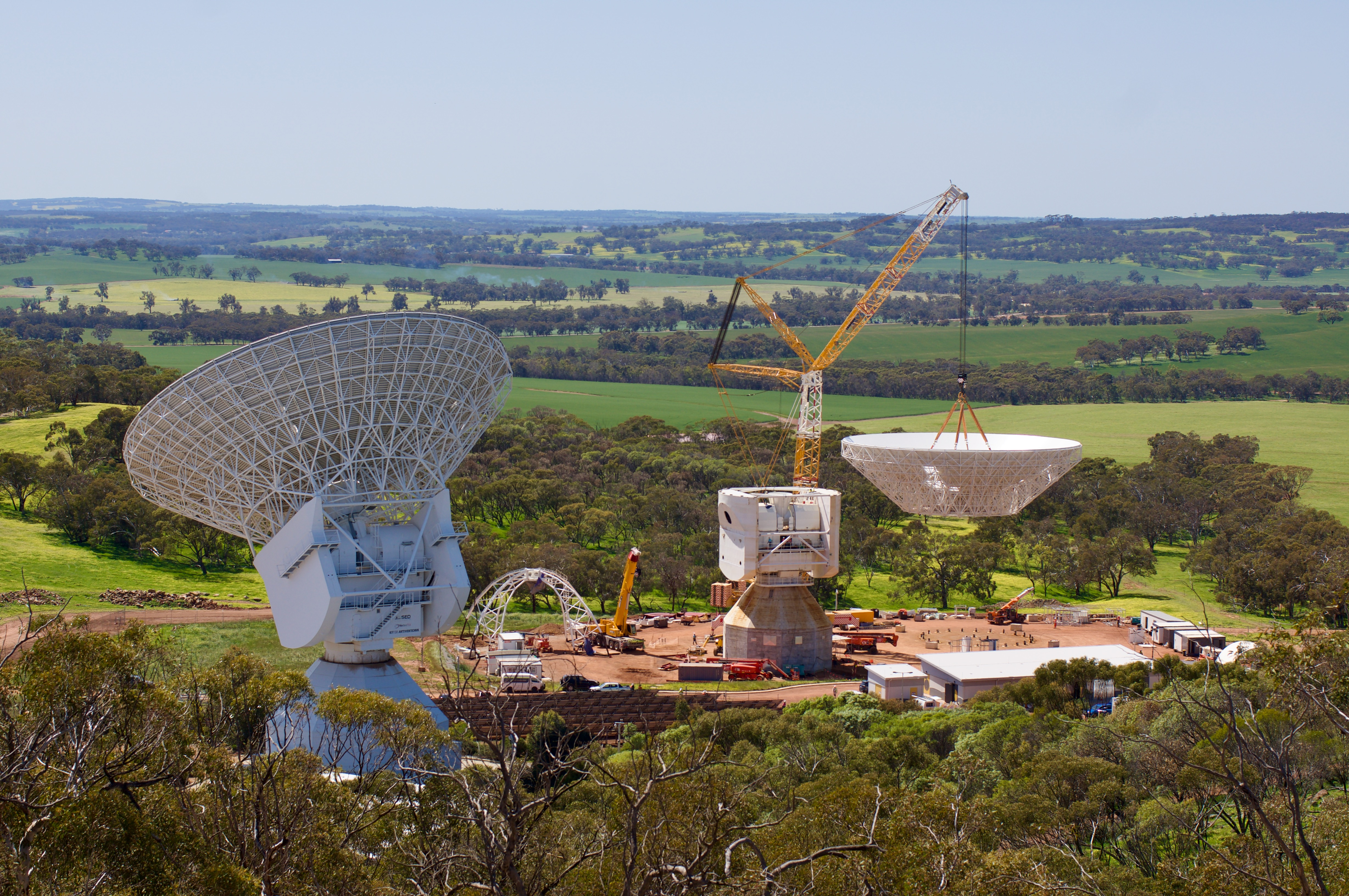
Crane lift of the 35m NNO3 main reflector and backup structure during construction. NNO1 is in the foreground.

Construction of the NNO-3 antenna at New Norcia was completed in late 2025. The new antenna is built to the same mechanical specification as NNO-1, utilising a 35-metre (115 ft) main reflector on a mount capable of 1 degree-per-second tracking in both azimuth and elevation, by a consortium of companies. The antenna supports X-, K- and Ka-bands uplink and downlink, and has provision for a future 100 kW class X-uplink. The official inauguration was in late 2025. In April 2026 the antenna entered full operations.

== Biomass calibration transponder ==
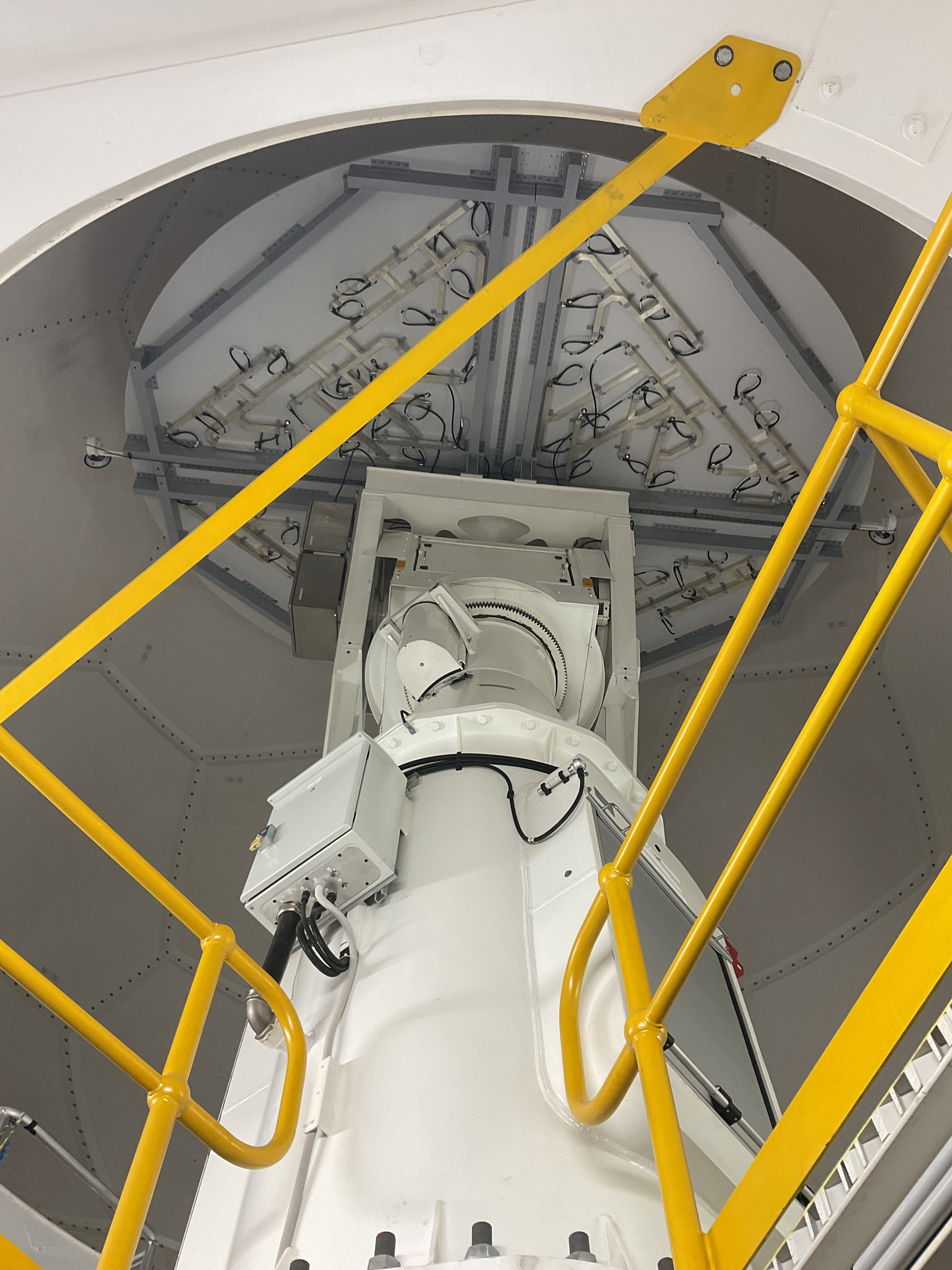
The Biomass Calibration Transponder at New Norcia Station, pictured during the first calibration pass of the Biomass spacecraft

A 435 MHz (also called P-band) transponder supports the Biomass spacecraft. This 4-metre (13 ft) antenna performs calibration of the spacecraft during its mission to map Earth's bio-matter.

The antenna makes use of a phased array of patch antennas, rather than the more usual parabolic reflector used for higher frequencies. It is housed within a small radome, which protects the antenna from weather, to ensure calibration passes can be performed regardless of wind speed.

== Launcher tracking ==
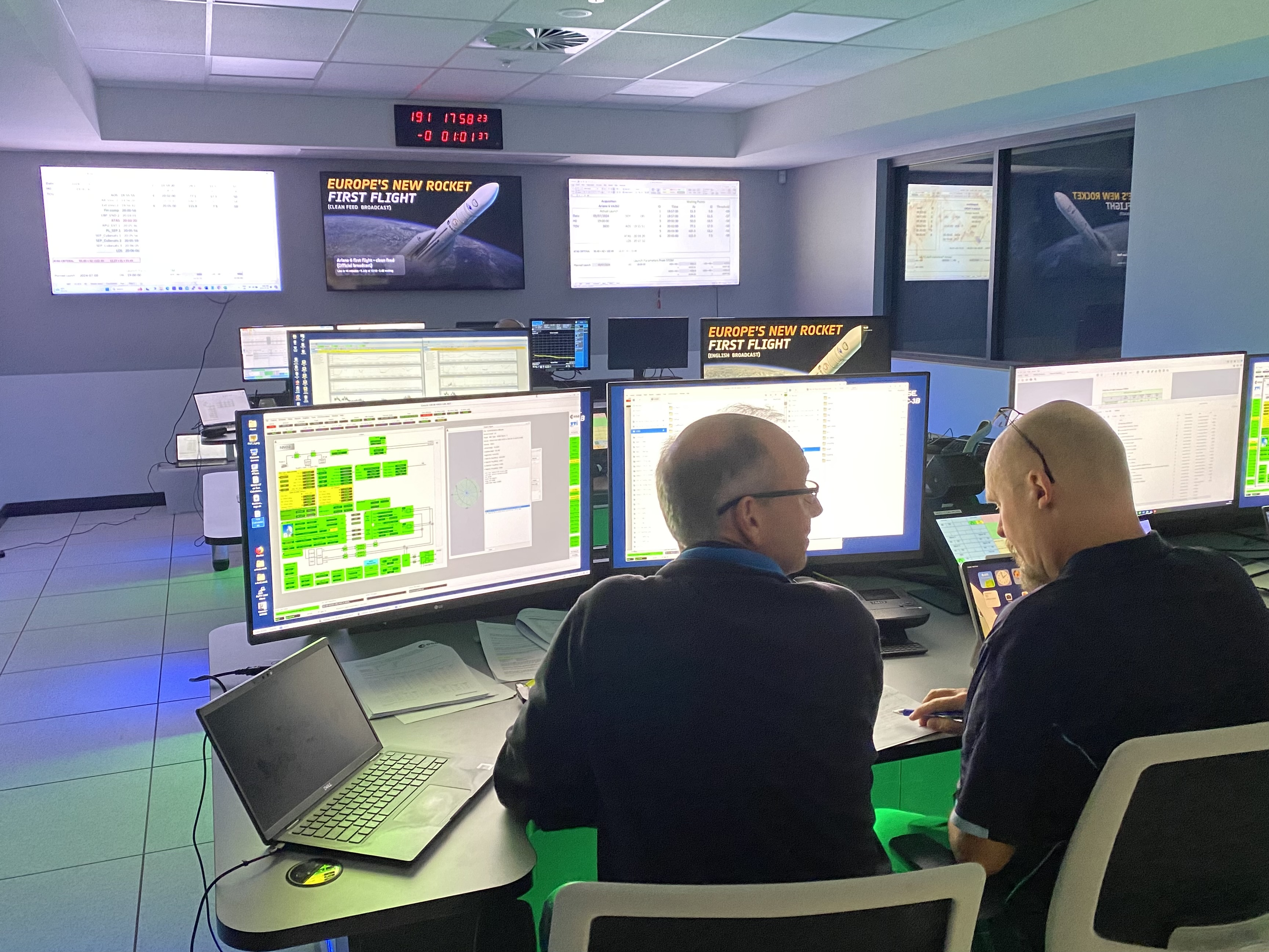
Operations staff at New Norcia during the countdown for VA262, the Maiden Ariane-6 launch

New Norcia station is routinely involved in tracking rocket launches from the Guiana Space Centre, including Ariane 6 and Vega launch vehicles, utilising the NNO-2 antenna, and occasionally NNO-1 for longer supports where the launcher ascends to higher orbits. During these supports New Norcia relays telemetry from the upper stage of the launcher back to Kourou.
