= ESTRACK =

Network of space-tracking stations of the European Space Agency

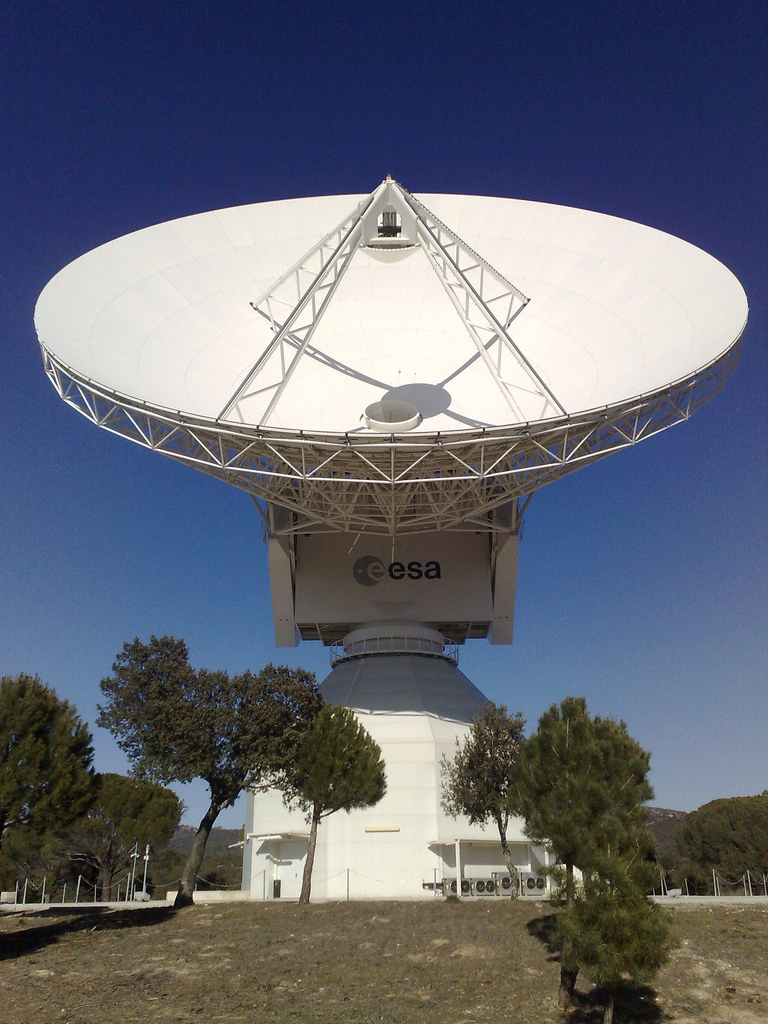
ESTRACK antenna in Cebreros

The European Space Tracking (ESTRACK) network consists of a number of ground-based space-tracking stations belonging to the European Space Agency (ESA), and operated by the European Space Operations Centre (ESOC) in Darmstadt, Germany. The stations support various ESA spacecraft and facilitate communications between ground operators and scientific probes such as XMM-Newton, Mars Express, BepiColombo, Gaia. Similar networks are run by the USA, China, Russia, Japan, and India.

== Antennas ==
Each ESTRACK station is different, supporting multiple missions, some sharing one or more of the same missions. The ESTRACK core network consists of:

Antennas of the ESTRACK-Network 2024 (Deep Space Antennas (DSA) highlighted in green)
Location	Code	Reflector ⌀ (m)	Construction date	Up	Down	Description
New Norcia, Australia	NNO1, (DSA 1)	35	2002	S, X	S, X	The Beam-Waveguide-Antenna was the first Deep Space antenna of ESA. (31.048°S 116.192°E).
New Norcia, Australia	NNO2	4,5	2015	X	S, X	The small and fast antenna can be used for Launch and Early Orbit Phases and for tracking rain, Vega and Soyuz launchers operated from ESA's Spaceport at Kourou, French Guiana. It was built to take over some capabilities of the Perth station. The antenna has got a larger field of view and can locate spacecraft after launch.
New Norcia, Australia	NNO3, (DSA 4)	35	2025	X, Ka	X, K, Ka	The new 35m antenna was inaugurated on 4 October 2025 and will enter in service NET March 2026. It can support the latest missions like Bepi Colombo, Juice or Euclid by receiving in higher frequency bands than NNO-1.
Kiruna Station in Kiruna, Sweden	KI1	15	1990	S	S, X	The station was built in 1990 and supports polar orbiting satellites. (67.857°N 20.964°E)
Kiruna Station in Kiruna, Sweden	KI2	13	2000	S	S, X	
ESEC in Redu, Belgium	RED	15	(1967) 1995	S	S	Redu is part of the ESTRACK network since the beginning. The site hosts more than 40 antennas including antennas for telecommunication satellites and Galileo. The current ESTRACK antenna was built in 1995 and is currently used for Galileo TT&C.
Cebreros, Spain	CEB, (DSA 2)	35	2005	X	X, K, Ka	The site previously hosted an Antenna of the Deep Space Network. (40.453°N 4.368°W)
Santa Maria, Azores, Portugal	SMA	5,5	2008		S, X	The station in Santa-Maria can be used to track Ariane launches with medium inclination and it is also capable of tracking Vega and Soyuz launchers operated from ESA's Spaceport at Kourou, French Guiana.
Kourou, French Guiana	KRU	15	1992	S, X	S, X	The Antenna is equipped with a 1.3m dish that can be used to acquire signals in X-Band, if the location of the spacecraft is not accurately known. (5.251°N 52.805°W)
Malargüe, Argentina	MLG, (DSA 3)	35	2012	X, Ka	X, K, Ka	The location in the southern hemisphere was chosen to complement the networks of NASA and JAXA that operate in the northern hemisphere. (35.776°S 69.398°W) The Pierre Auger Observatory is also located in Malargüe.

=== Former stations ===
- Perth Station (Australia)
- Maspalomas Station (Gran Canaria, Spain)
- Villafranca Station (Spain)

== Composition ==
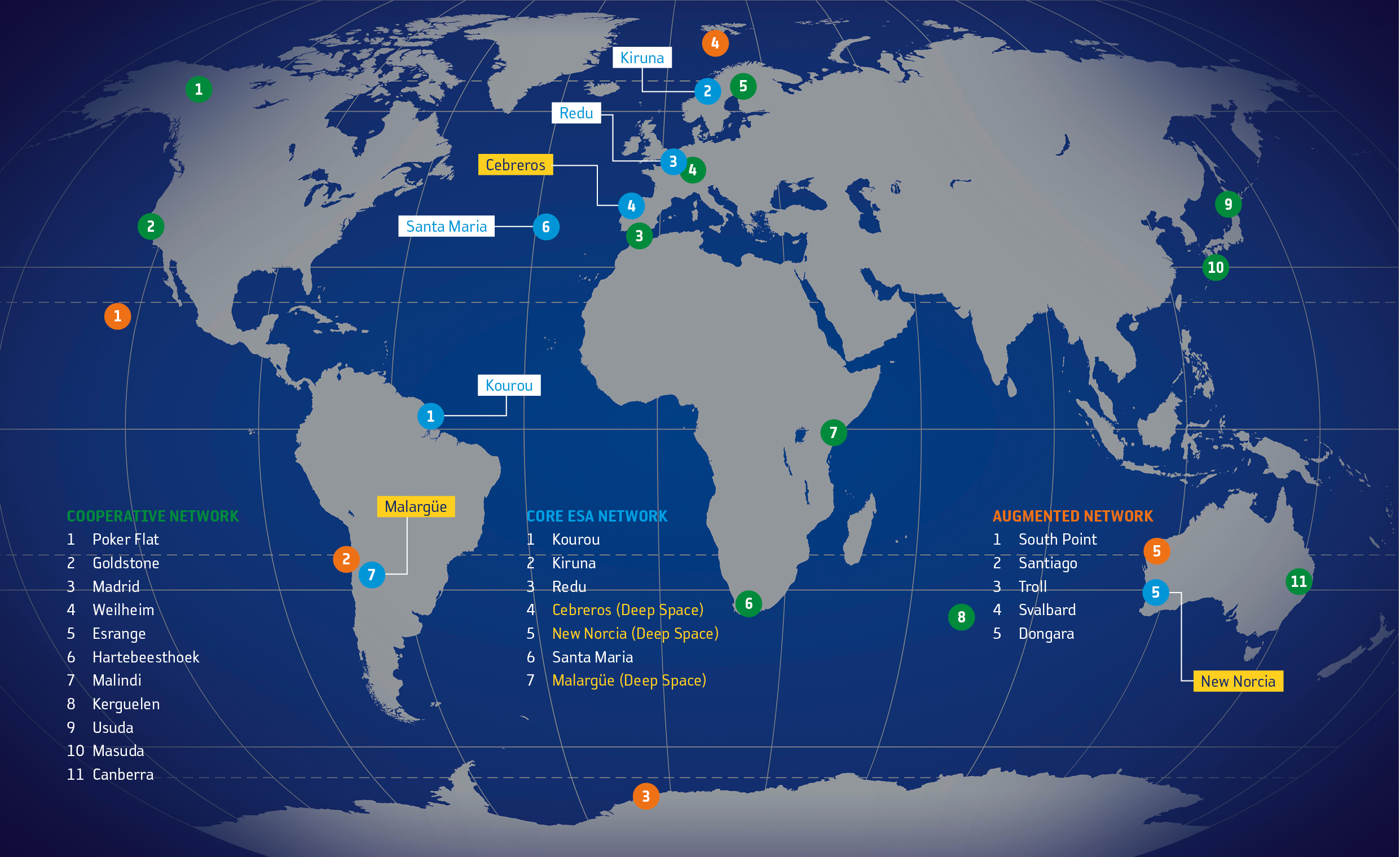
Locations of ESTRACK's ESA owned stations (in blue) on a world map

The ESTRACK network consists of several ground station around the world. Some of them are owned by ESA itself while others are owned by commercial and other institutional operators. The core stations as well as all of the connections to the missions are operated through the Network Operations Centre at ESOC.

=== Core Ground Stations ===
The Core ESTRACK network is composed of seven ESA-owned ground stations. Four of the stations are used for tracking satellites and launchers near Earth and three are used for tracking deep-space probes. Details about the stations are shown in the next section.

=== Augmented Network ===
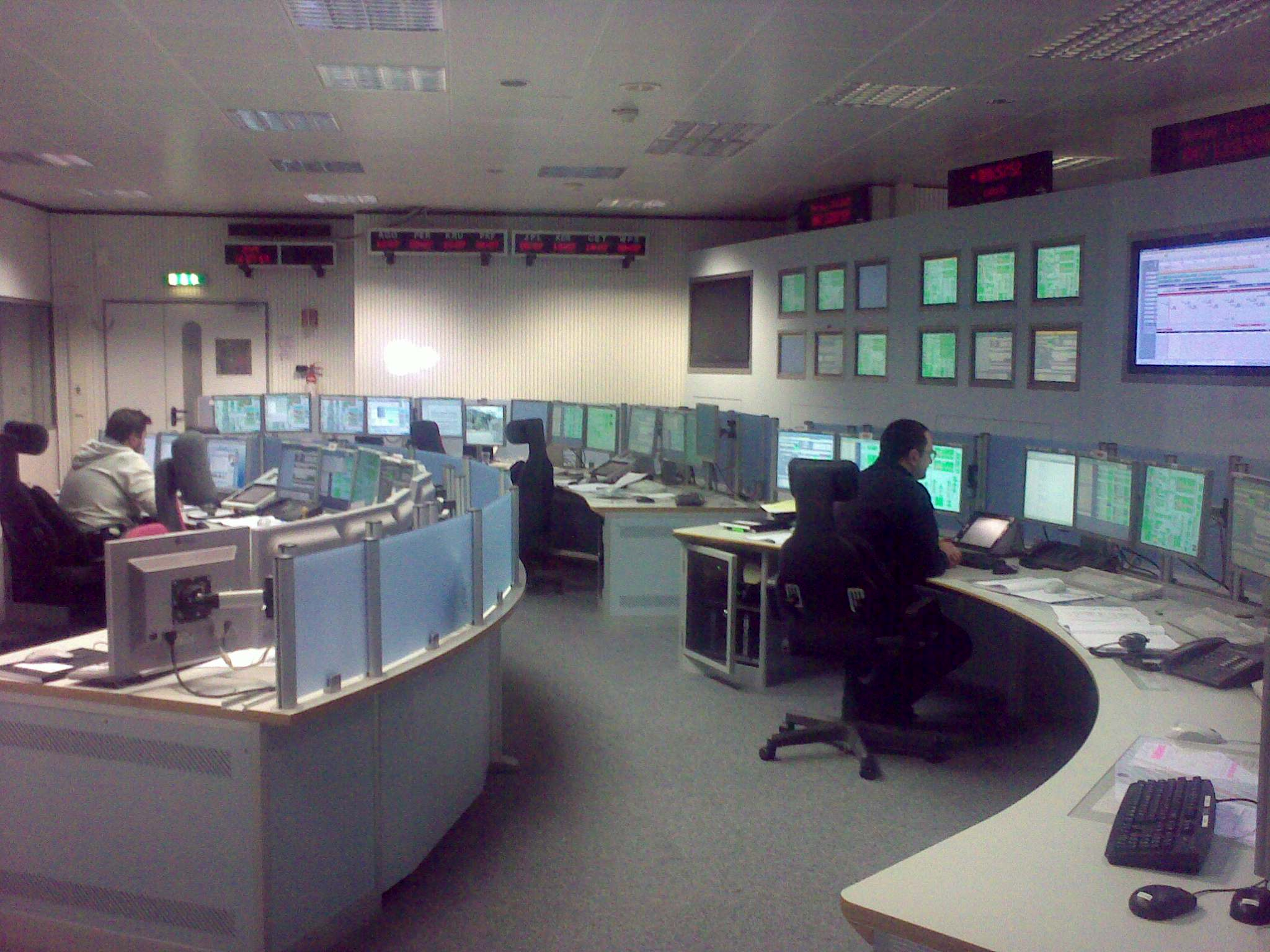
ESTRACK Network Operations Centre in ESOC

Service contracts with commercially operated ground stations allows the network to track satellites that aren't in view of the ESA owned ground stations. The most relevant operators include KSAT, SSC and Goonhilly Satellite Earth Station. The composition is constantly changing and for every launch different stations may be used.

- South Point
- Santiago
- Troll
- Svalbard
- Dongara

=== Cooperative Network ===
Cooperation agreements with international partners further enhance the network. Some of these are Deep Space Stations and therefore can offer services that are not be provided by commercial operators. The agreements are usually made on an exchange of services or as a contribution to a mission, meaning that no exchange of funds is part of the agreement.

- Poker Flat
- Goldstone
- Weilheim
- Esrange
- Hartebeesthoek
- Malindi Space Centre (Kenya)
- Kerguelen
- Usuda
- Masuda
- Canberra
- Sardinia Radio Telescope

== See also ==
- European Astronaut Centre (EAC)
- European Centre for Space Applications and Telecommunications (ECSAT)
- European Space Agency (ESA)
- European Space Astronomy Centre (ESAC)
- European Space Operations Centre (ESOC)
- European Space Research and Technology Centre (ESTEC)
- ESA Centre for Earth Observation (ESRIN)
- Guiana Space Centre (CSG)
