= Villafranca Station =

Coordinates: 40°26′33.23″N 3°57′5.70″W

Villafranca Station (also known as VILSPA) was an ESTRACK satellite ground station in Spain, 30 kilometres (19 mi) north from the city of Madrid in a Villanueva de la Cañada, within the area of European Space Astronomy Centre.

Station currently operates 15m S-band antenna marked VIL-1 capable of automatic tracking, ranging, frequency and timing measurements, monitoring, control and two-way communications. Additional facilities provide tracking, telemetry, telecommand and radiometric measurements.

In 2014 VIL-1 was upgraded to use SARAS (Spanish acronym for Fast Acquisition of Satellites and Launchers) system allowing easier estimation of the beam direction increasing tracking precision and accuracy.

In 2012 first antenna of the Villafranca Station, built in 1974 and designated VIL-1, was passed to the Instituto Nacional de Técnica Aeroespacial and dedicated to the Cooperation through Education in Science and Astronomy Research (CESAR) project and currently is used as a radio telescope for educational purposes.

In 2017 VIL-1 has been transferred to European industry
