= European Space Research and Technology Centre =

European Space Agency technology complex

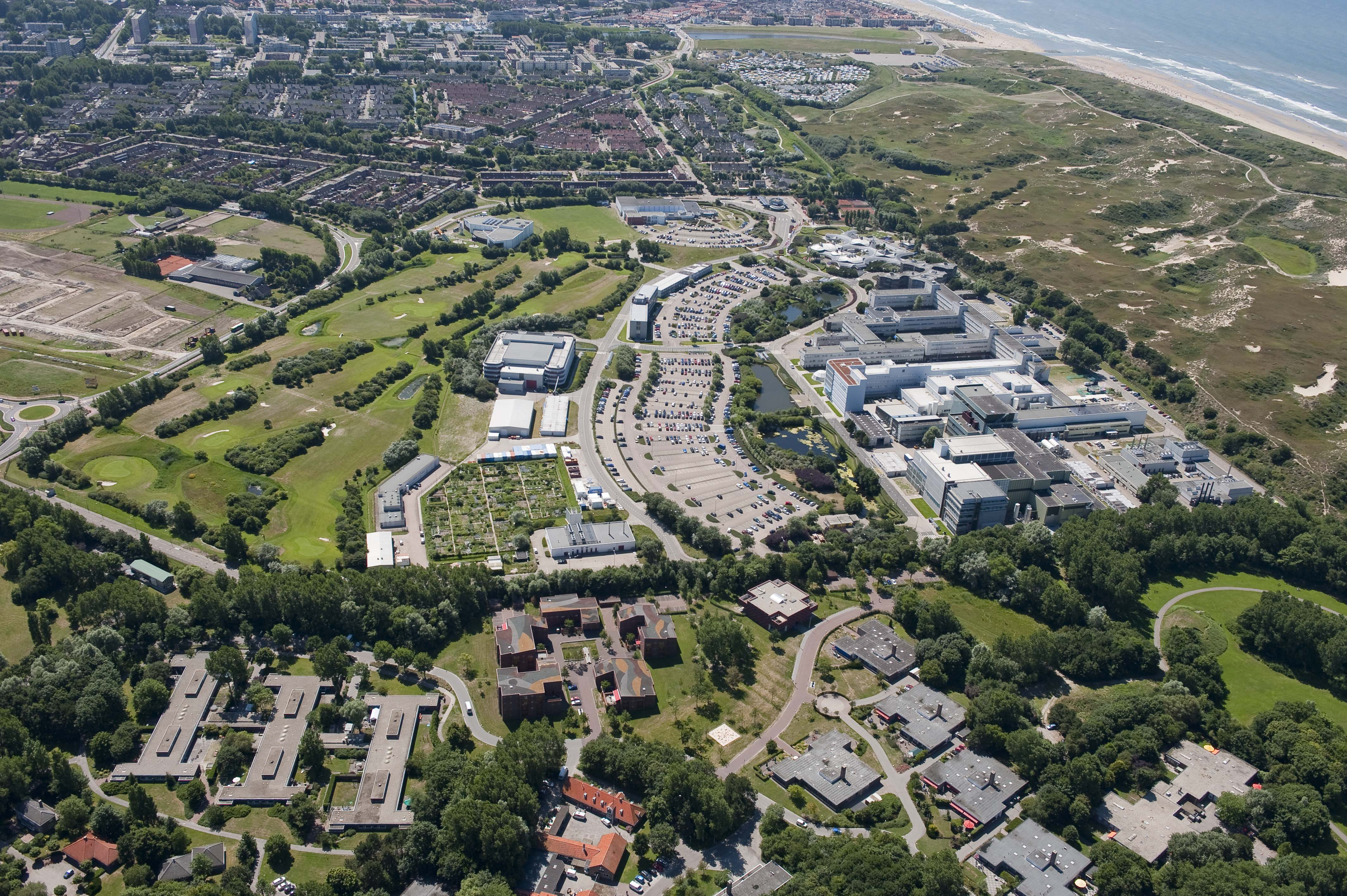
- Aerial view of ESA's technical centre ESTEC
- Abbreviation: ESTEC
- Location: Noordwijk, Netherlands
- Coordinates: 52.21915°N 4.42044°E
- Parent organization: European Space Agency
- Staff: 2,500
- Website: www.esa.int/About_Us/ESTEC

The European Space Research and Technology Centre (ESTEC) is the European Space Agency's main technology development and test centre for spacecraft and space technology. It is situated in Noordwijk, South Holland, in the western Netherlands, although several kilometers off the village but immediately linked to the most Northern district of the nearby town Katwijk.

At ESTEC, about 2,500 engineers, technicians and scientists work hands-on with mission design, spacecraft and space technology. ESTEC provides extensive testing facilities to verify the proper operation of spacecraft, such as the Large Space Simulator (LSS), acoustic and electromagnetic testing bays, multi-axis vibration tables and the ESA Propulsion Laboratory (EPL). Prior to launch, all of the equipment that ESA launches is tested in some degree at ESTEC, other than those tested at national space centers of ESA member countries.

The Space Expo is ESTEC's visitors centre. It has a permanent exhibition about space exploration.

== Activities ==
- Future mission assessment
- Current project support
- Test Center
- Operations

== History ==
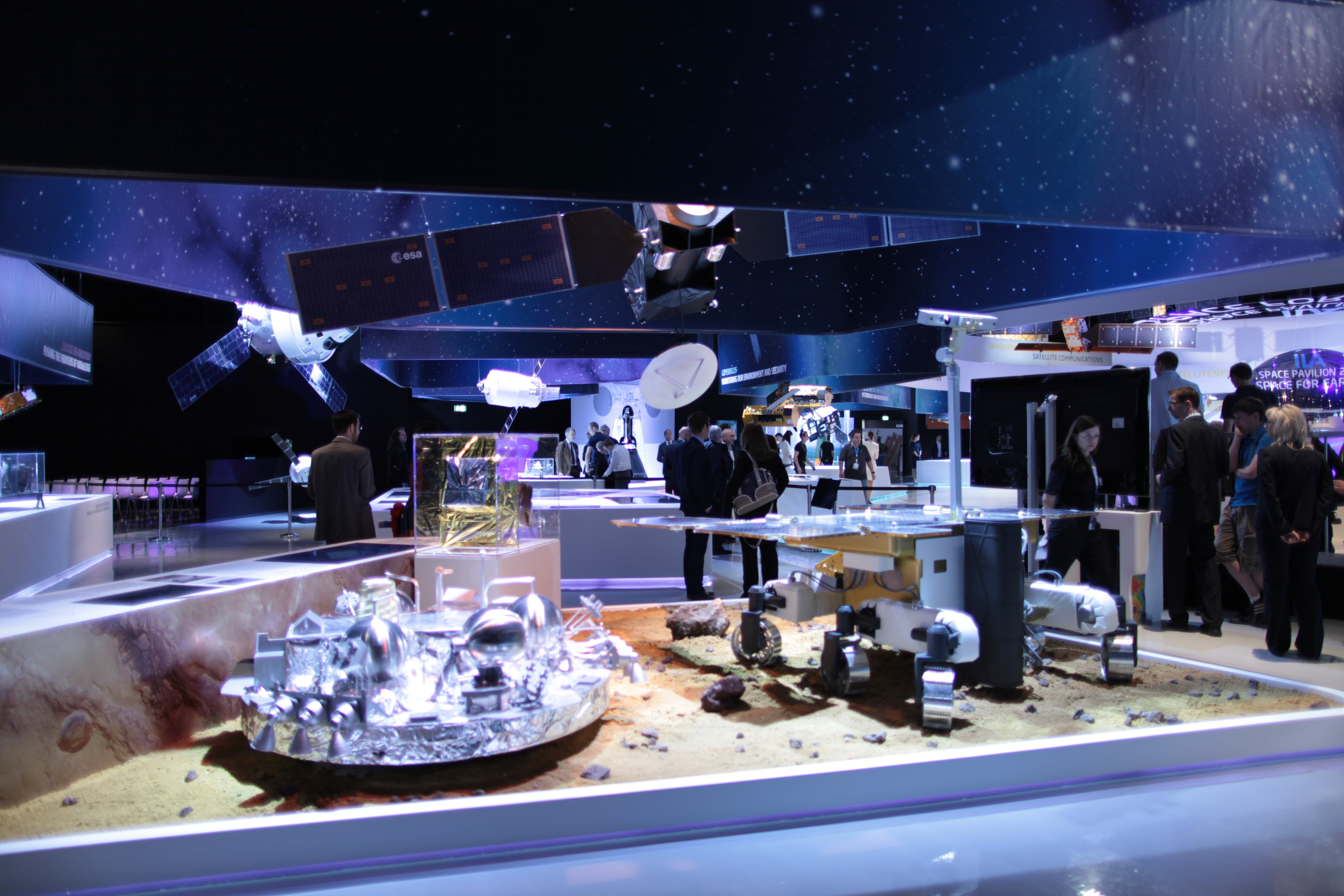
Models of ExoMars EDM Schiaparelli and the ExoMars Rover, now the Rosalind Franklin rover, at ESTEC, 2014

The European Space Research and Technology Centre (ESTEC) was founded in 1968. The centre was to be the core of the European Space Research Organisation (ESRO). Its responsibilities included the engineering and testing of satellites and their payloads, the integration of scientific instruments in these payloads, and making arrangements for their launch. In some cases member states were to produce the scientific instruments for ESRO or produce them as part of their own national effort and compensate ESTEC for its service. In practice, national organisations simply used ESTEC as a service organisation and left it to pay for their efforts from the ESRO budget. After the Bannier Report the facility gained overall executive authority for spacecraft development and was merged with ESLAB. The satellite control centre was moved to European Space Operations Centre (ESOC). ESTEC was originally to be located in Delft (South Holland) but because of unforeseen difficulties, Noordwijk was chosen instead.

== ESA Test Centre ==
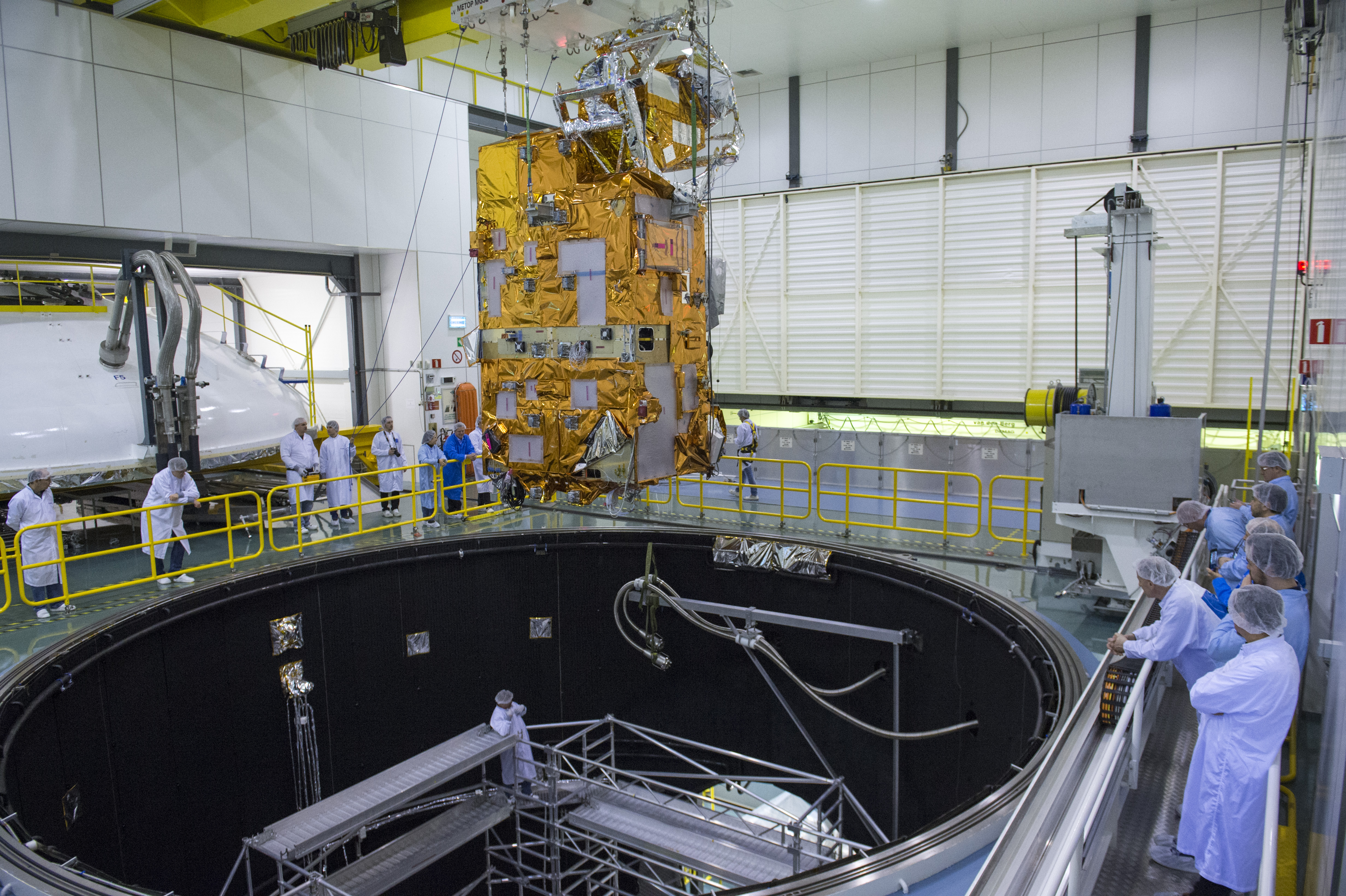
MetOp-C's payload module being lowered into Large Space Simulator, 2017

In 1964 the ESRO decided to create an independent test centre that would be part of ESTEC. The first building with vibration and thermal vacuum facilities (named F-building) was completed in 1966 and the first satellite to be tested was the ESRO-1 satellite in 1968. From the 1970s to the late 1980s the test centre was enlarged by following facilities: The Dynamic Test Chamber (DTC) in 1975, The Multishaker in 1983, The EMC facility in 1985, The Large Space simulator (by extending the DTC) in 1986, The Large European Acoustic Facility (LEAF) in 1989 and the Compact Payload Test Range (CPTR) in 1990.

In the 1990s and 2000s the following major facilities have been added: The hydraulic shaker system (HYDRA), The Fr building with additional clean rooms (2000), The Large EMC facility (Maxwell) and the QUAD Shaker in 2008.

In 1997 the test operations and facilities maintenance activities were subcontracted to the COMET consortium and in the year 2000 the test management, maintenance, operations and marketing of the test centre has been taken over by European Test Services B.V. (a subsidiary of IABG mbH and Intespace SA); The facilities are still belonging to ESA which is responsible for the facility development, test methodologies, test related engineering and subcontractor control.

Since the year 2000 not only tests for space industry have been performed but the facilities are also used for aerospace-, railway-, transport-, marine- and power- testing for customers like ABB, ALSTOM, Airbus, Bombardier and many more.

== Space Expo ==
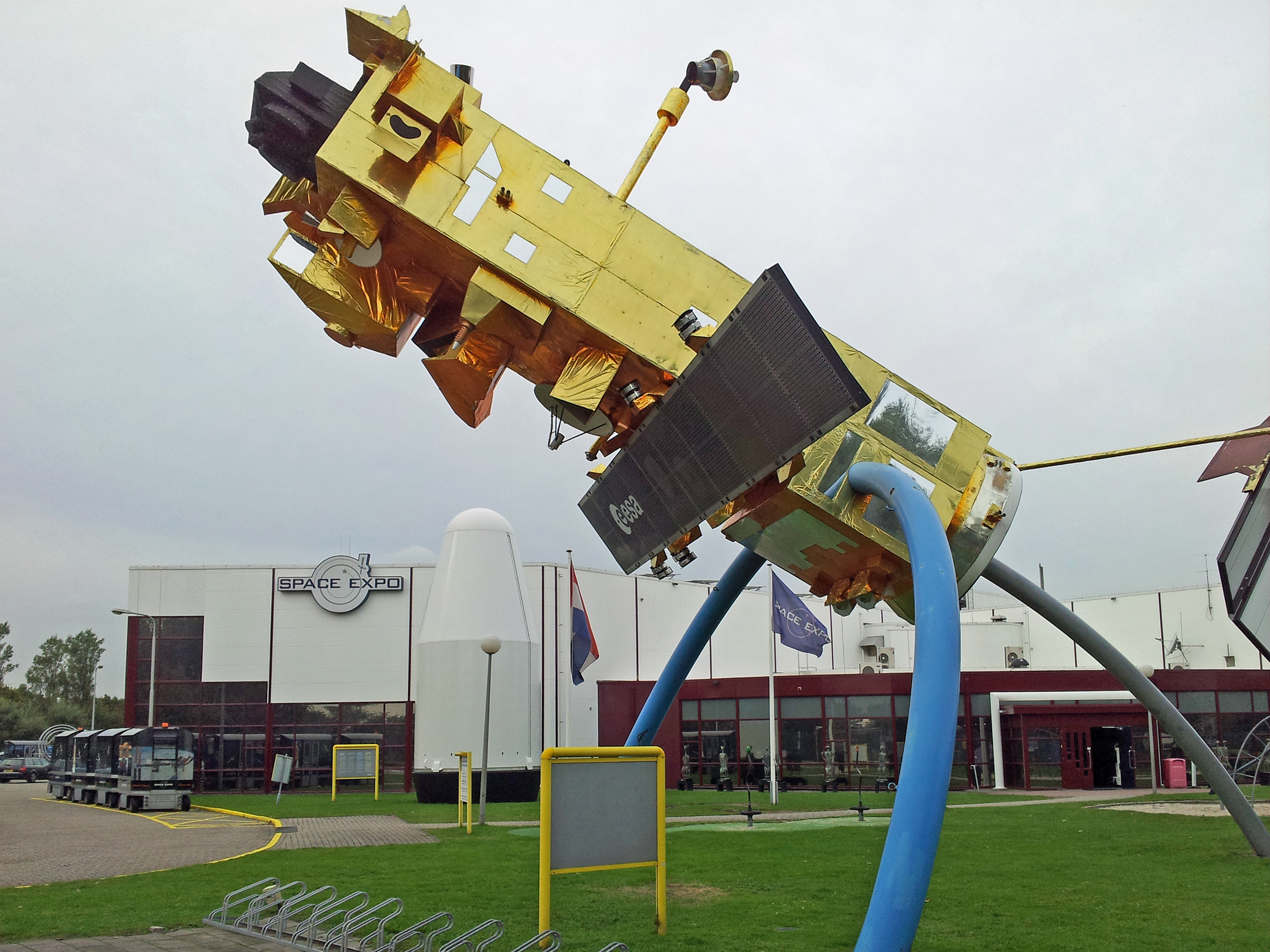
Space Expo in 2013

The Space Expo is the permanent exhibition about space exploration at the ESTEC compound in Noordwijk. It was opened in 1990 by Queen Beatrix of the Netherlands and Prince Friso of Orange-Nassau. The exhibition has more than 120,000 visitors annually. Notable exhibits include life-size models of the International Space Station and the Eagle lunar lander, the original Soyuz TMA-03M space capsule and a real moon rock brought back by the Apollo 17 mission.

== See also ==
=== Facilities within the ESTEC ===
- Advanced Concepts Team
- Concurrent Design Facility
- Mission Science Division

=== Other ===
- ESA Centre for Earth Observation (ESRIN)
- European Astronaut Centre (EAC)
- European Centre for Space Applications and Telecommunications (ECSAT)
- European Space Astronomy Centre (ESAC)
- European Space Operations Centre (ESOC)
- European Space Tracking Network (ESTRACK)
- Guiana Space Centre (CSG)
