= Crew Medical Support Office =

The primary function of medical operations, centred at the Space Medicine Office (SMO) in the European Astronaut Centre, Cologne, Germany, is to maximize the operational effectiveness and minimize risks to the health of the European astronauts involved in human space flight . Furthermore, SMO also functions as a means of support to ESA astronaut families throughout their careers.

In order to fulfill this function SMO provides flight surgeon services in combination with direct biomedical engineer support. To be fully effective these key areas of service provision require additional in-house supporting elements namely; exercise science, rehabilitation, IT and project management capabilities.
