= European Soil Database =

The European Soil Database is the only harmonized soil database in Europe from which many other data information and services are derived. For instance, the European Soil Database v2 Raster Library contains raster (grid) data files with cell sizes of 1 km x 1 km for a large number of soil related parameters. Each grid is aligned with the INSPIRE reference grid. These rasters are in the public domain and allow expert users to use the data for instance to run soil-, water- and air related models. The European Soil Database may be downloaded from the European Soil Data Center (ESDAC).

The soil raster data files are accompanied by as many static soil maps (PDF Format, A3), which allow the user to have a quick overview of the distribution of soil characteristics in a spatial way. The many rasters include parameters such as soil texture (clay, silt and sand), parent material, WRB soil type, Obstacle to roots, soil depth, Impermeability, Soil Water Regime, Water Management System, mineralogy, cation exchange capacity, packing density, available water capacity.

The European Soil Database is based on experts' knowledge. In addition to the European Soil Database, the European Commission runs the LUCAS topsoil survey collecting soil samples across the soils of European Union. Based on LUCAS topsoil database, scientists have modelled the spatial distribution of soil physical properties (Sand, Silt, Clay, Coarse fragments, etc).

In an attempt to expand soil data at European scale, the European Commission Joint Research Centre runs the LUCAS topsoil survey collecting soil samples across the soils of European Union. Based on LUCAS topsoil database, scientists have modelled the spatial distribution of soil physical properties (sand, silt, clay, coarse fragments, etc).

Additionally, in ESDAC, a number of mapping services has been developed in order to allow the public to navigate and query soil data. The ESDAC Map Viewer is a web-based application for the navigation of ESDB related data through a map interface. This map service allows interaction through soil parameter selection and map operations such as zooming and panning. The data can be queried and identified. According to INSPIRE principles, this application has been created and extended using international standards (OGC - WMS) so that it is possible to combine layers of maps located in different map servers all around the World.

Download Sources:

- Vector Data
- Raster Library 1km x 1km

== See also ==
- European Soil Data Centre
