= European Space Operations Centre =

Main mission control centre for the European Space Agency

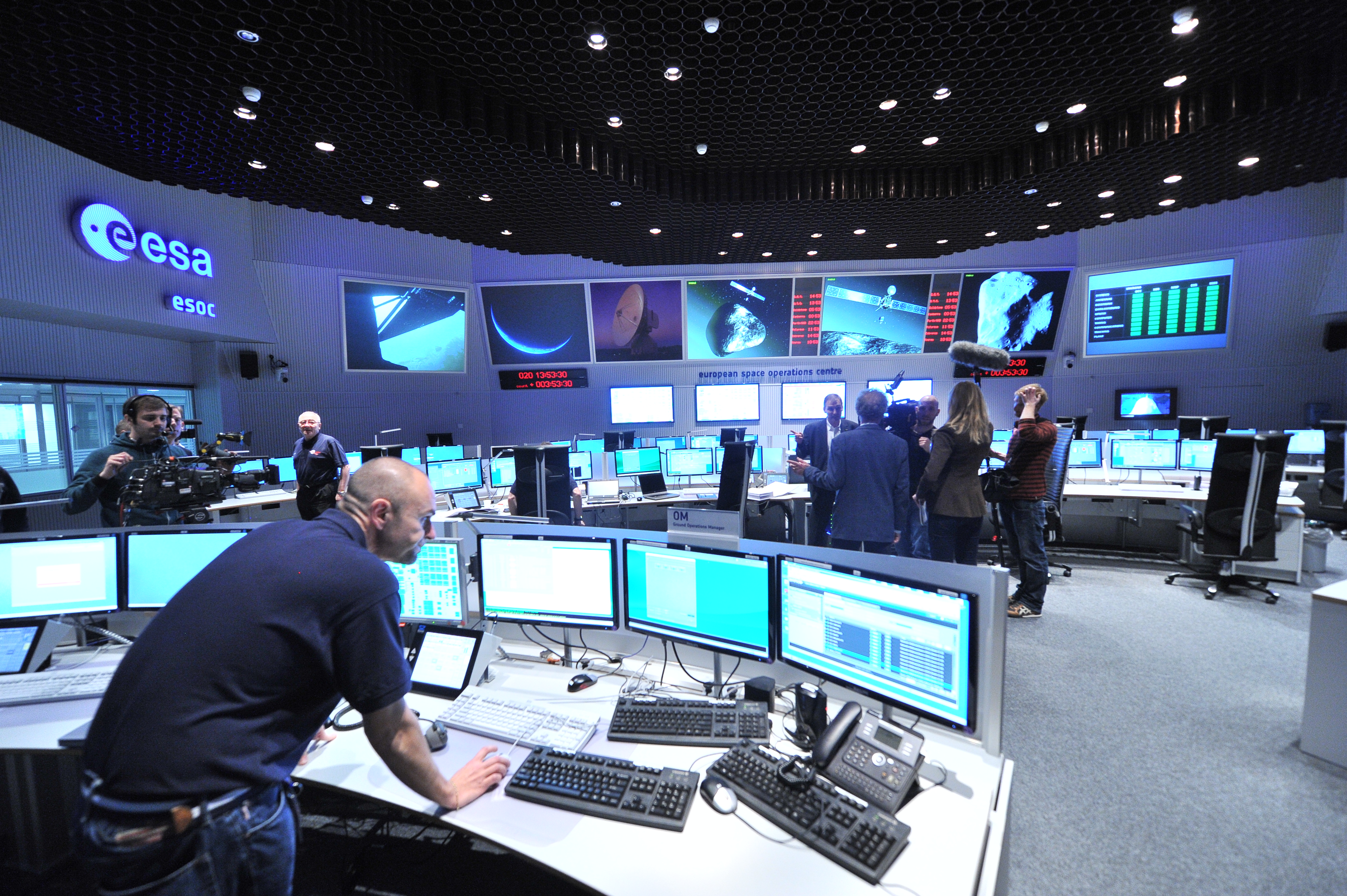
- ESOC Main Control Room in Darmstadt, Germany
- Abbreviation: ESOC
- Formation: 8 September 1967
- Type: IGO
- Purpose: Spacecraft ground control
- Headquarters: Paris, France
- Location: Darmstadt, Germany
- Coordinates: 49°52′16″N 8°37′22″E
- Head of Establishment: Rolf Densing
- Parent organization: European Space Agency
- Staff: >800
- Website: www.esa.int/esoc
- Remarks: ESOC is one of nine establishments operated by ESA

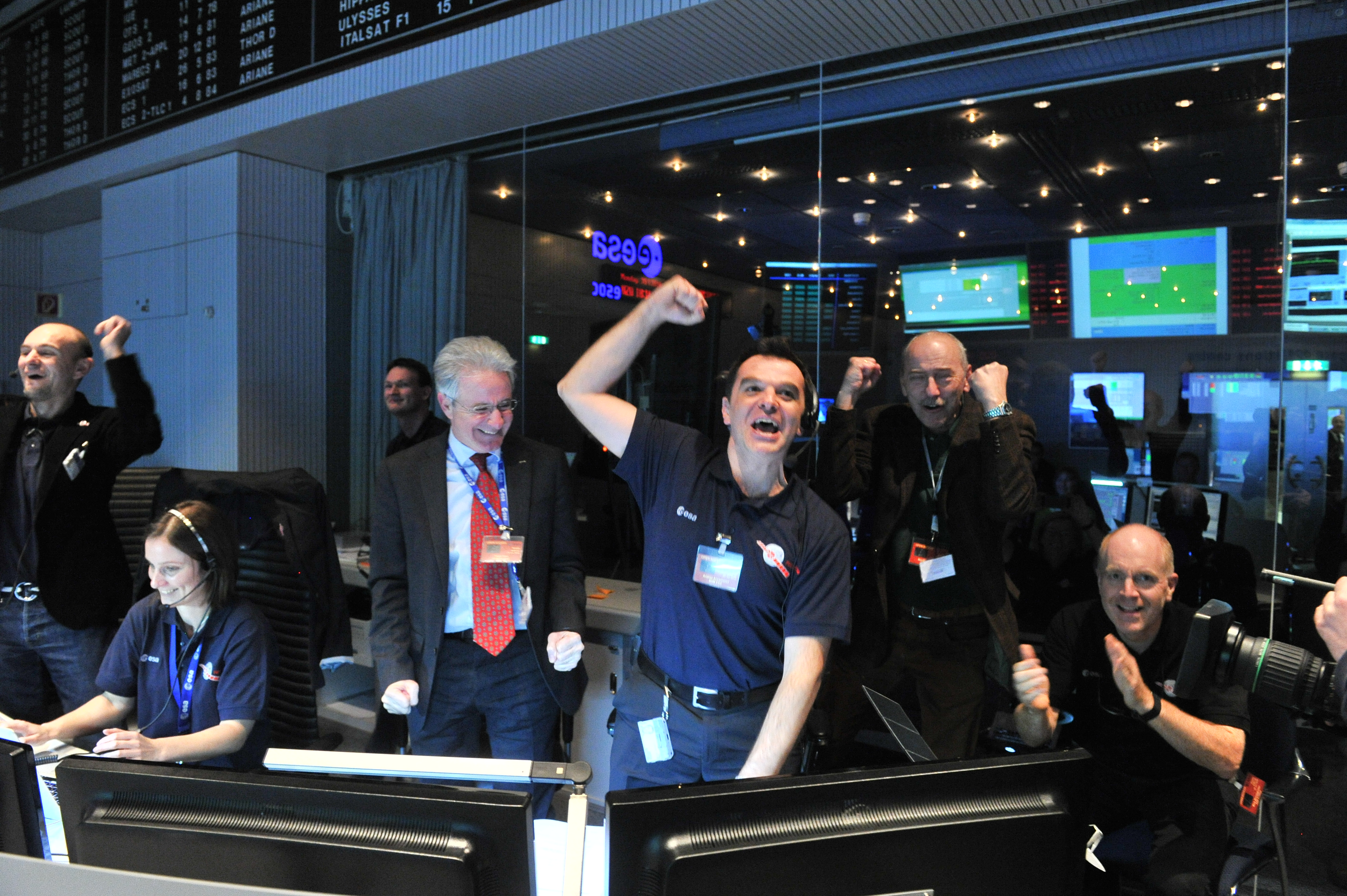
Signal received at ESOC from Rosetta (January 2014), the first comet landing mission

The European Space Operations Centre (ESOC) serves as the main mission control centre for the European Space Agency (ESA) and is located in Darmstadt, Germany. ESOC's primary function is the operation of uncrewed spacecraft on behalf of ESA and the launch and early orbit phases (LEOP) of ESA and third-party missions. The centre is also responsible for a range of operations-related activities within ESA and in cooperation with ESA's industry and international partners, including ground systems engineering, software development, flight dynamics and navigation, development of mission control tools and techniques and space debris studies.

ESOC's current major activities comprise operating planetary and solar missions, such as Mars Express and the Trace Gas Orbiter, astronomy & fundamental physics missions, such as Gaia and XMM Newton, and Earth observation missions such as CryoSat2 and Swarm.

ESOC is responsible for developing, operating and maintaining ESA's ESTRACK network of ground stations. Teams at the centre are also involved in research and development related to advanced mission control concepts and Space Situational Awareness, and standardisation activities related to frequency management; mission operations; tracking, telemetry and telecommanding; and space debris.

== Missions ==
ESOC's current missions comprise the following:

Planetary and solar missions

- BepiColombo
- Mars Express
- Solar Orbiter
- ExoMars Trace Gas Orbiter
- Cluster II
- JUpiter ICy moons Explorer (JUICE)
- Hera

Astronomy and fundamental physics missions

- Gaia
- INTEGRAL
- XMM-Newton
- Euclid

Earth observation missions

- CryoSat-2
- Swarm
- Sentinel-1A
- Sentinel-1C
- Sentinel-2A
- Sentinel-2B
- Sentinel-2C
- Sentinel-5 Precursor
- SMOS
- EarthCARE

In addition, the ground segment and mission control teams for several missions are in preparation and training, including:

- ExoMars
- Biomass
- FLEX
- PLATO
- future satellites of the Sentinel programme

== ESTRACK ==
ESOC hosts the control centre for the Agency's European Tracking ESTRACK station network. The core network comprises seven stations in seven countries: Kourou (French Guiana), Cebreros (Spain), Redu (Belgium), Santa Maria (Portugal), Kiruna (Sweden), Malargüe (Argentina) and New Norcia (Australia). Operators are on duty at ESOC 24 hours/day, year round, to conduct tracking passes, uploading telecommands and downloading telemetry and data.

== Activities ==
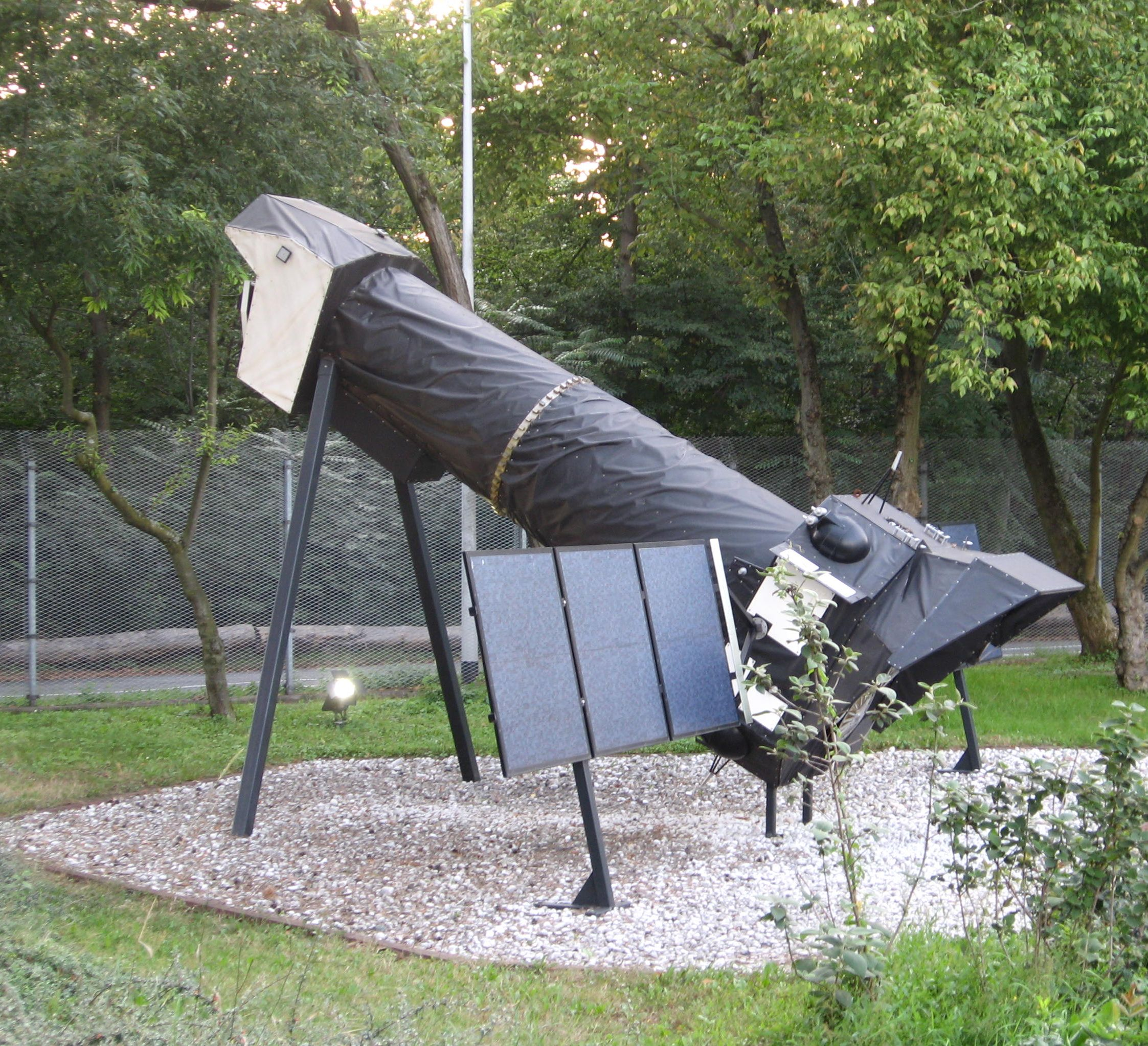
XMM-Newton model at ESOC

In addition to 'pure' mission operations, a number of other activities take place at the centre, most of which are directly related to ESA's broader space operations activities.

- Flight dynamics: A team is responsible for all orbital calculations and orbit determinations.
- Mission analysis: Selection and calculation of possible orbits and launch windows
- Software development: Mission control systems and spacecraft management tools
- ESA Navigation Support Office: Calculating and predicting GPS and Galileo satellite orbits
- Ground station engineering: Developing deep-space tracking technology
- Space debris: Coordinating ESA's debris research, provision of conjunction warning services and cooperating with agencies worldwide
- Frequency management: Helping manage radio spectrum used by all satellite operators

== History ==
The European Space Operations Centre was formally inaugurated in Darmstadt, Germany, on 8 September 1967 by the then-Minister of Research of the Federal Republic of Germany, Gerhard Stoltenberg. Its role was to provide satellite control for the European Space Research Organisation (ESRO), which is today known as its successor organisation, the European Space Agency (ESA).

The 90-person ESOC facility was, as it is today, located on the west side of Darmstadt; it employed the staff and resources previously allocated to the European Space Data Centre (ESDAC), which had been established in 1963 to conduct orbit calculations. These were augmented by mission control staff transferred from ESTEC to operate satellites and manage the ESTRACK tracking station network.

Within just eight months, ESOC, as part of ESRO, was already operating its first mission, ESRO-2B, a scientific research satellite and the first of many operated from ESOC for ESRO, and later ESA.

By July 2012, ESOC had operated over 56 missions spanning science, Earth observation, orbiting observatories, meteorology and space physics.

In 2024 ESA announced a new satellite control center at ESOC. Designed to support multiple launch operations at once and with power redundancy that will provide 99% uptime, the control center will be designed with the future in mind.

== Location and expansion ==
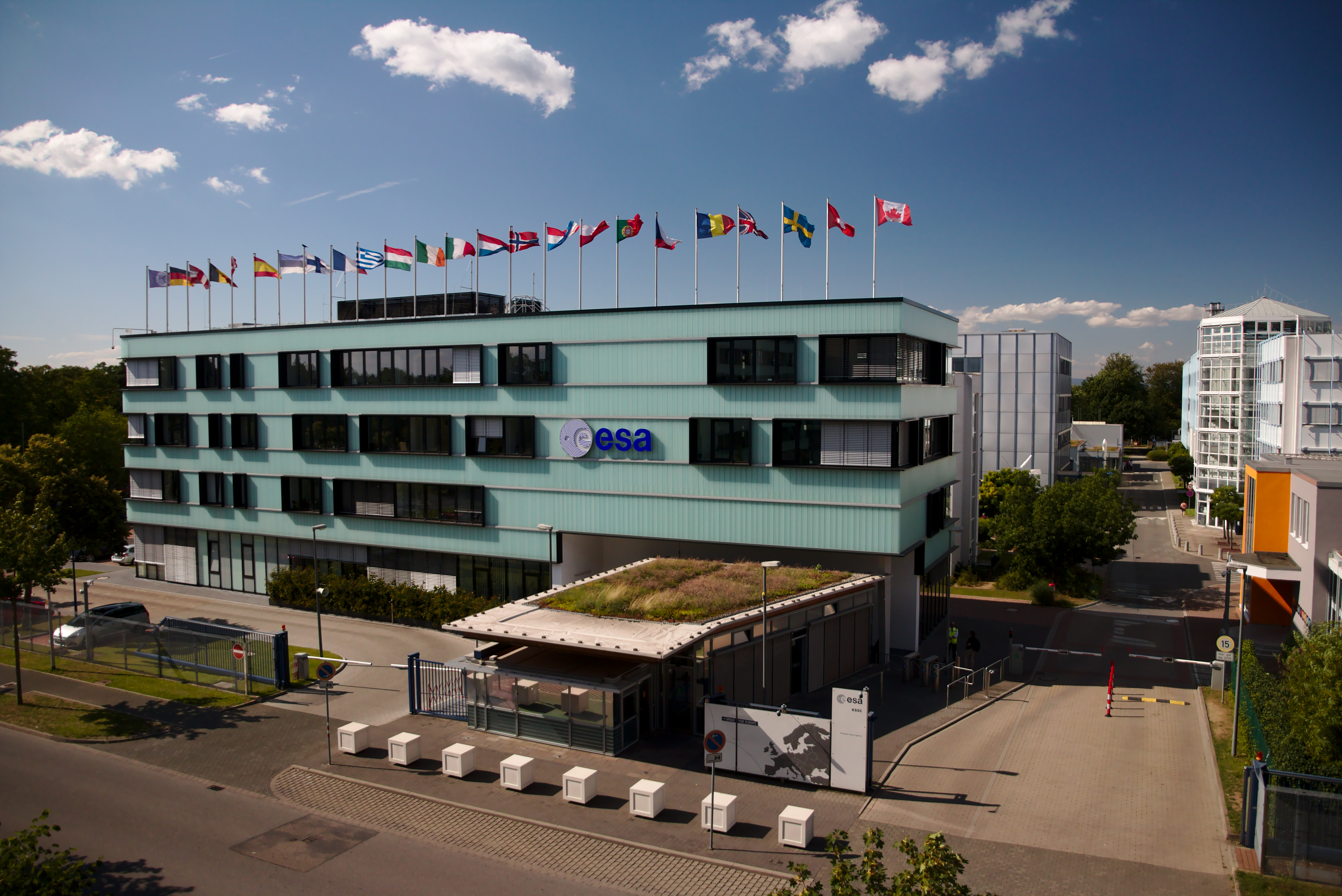
European Space Operations Centre

ESOC is located on the west side of the city of Darmstadt, some 500 m (1,600 ft) from the main train station, at Robert-Bosch-Straße 5. In 2011, ESA announced the first phase of the ESOC II modernisation and expansion project valued at €60 million. The new construction is located across Robert-Bosch-Straße, opposite the current centre.

== Employees ==
At ESOC, ESA employs approximately 800, comprising some 250 permanent staff and about 550 contractors. Staff from ESOC are routinely dispatched to work at other ESA establishments, ESTRACK stations, the ATV Control Centre (Toulouse), the Columbus Control Centre (Oberpfaffenhofen) and at partner facilities in several countries.

== See also ==
- ATV Control Centre (Toulouse, France)
- Columbus Control Centre (Oberpfaffenhofen, Germany)
- ESA Centre for Earth Observation (ESRIN)
- European Centre for Space Applications and Telecommunications (ECSAT)
- European Space Astronomy Centre (ESAC)
- European Space Research and Technology Centre (ESTEC)
- European Union Satellite Centre (EU SatCen)
