= European Space Astronomy Centre =

ESA center specialized in space astronomy

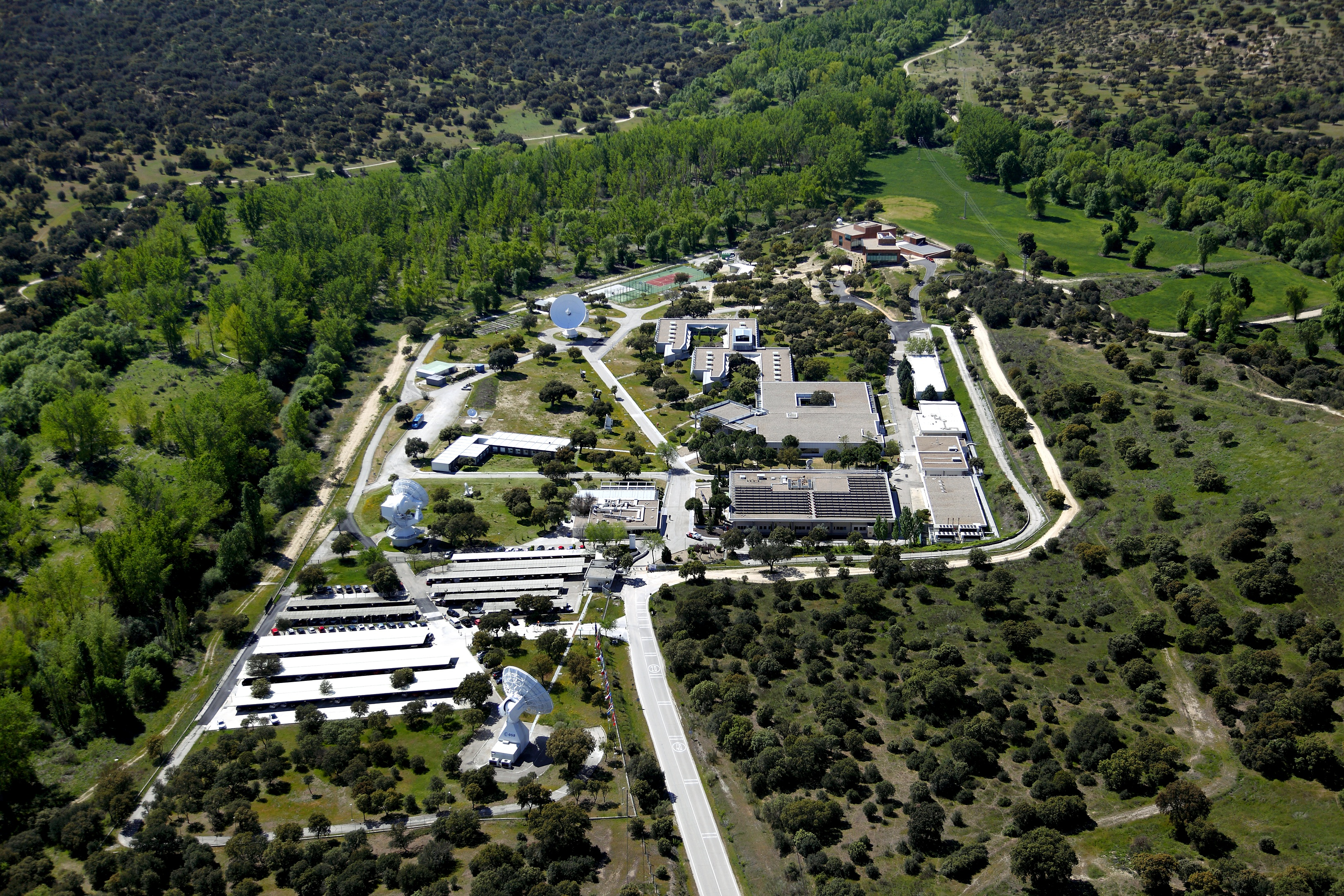
- Aerial view of ESAC
- Abbreviation: ESAC
- Type: IGO
- Location: Villafranca del Castillo, Villanueva de la Cañada, Spain
- Leader: Carole Mundell (Director)
- Parent organization: European Space Agency
- Website: www.esa.int/esac
- Remarks: ESAC is one of nine establishments operated by ESA

The European Space Astronomy Centre (ESAC) near Madrid in Spain is a research centre of the European Space Agency (ESA). ESAC is the lead institution for space science (astronomy, Solar System exploration and fundamental physics) using ESA missions. It hosts the science operation centres for all ESA astronomy and planetary missions and their scientific data archives. ESA's Cebreros Station deep-space communication antennas are located nearby.

== Location ==
ESAC is located near Villafranca del Castillo, within the municipal limits of Villanueva de la Cañada, is located 30 km west of Madrid in the Guadarrama Valley. The site is surrounded by light woodland and is adjacent to the ruins of the 15th-century Aulencia Castle.

== Missions ==
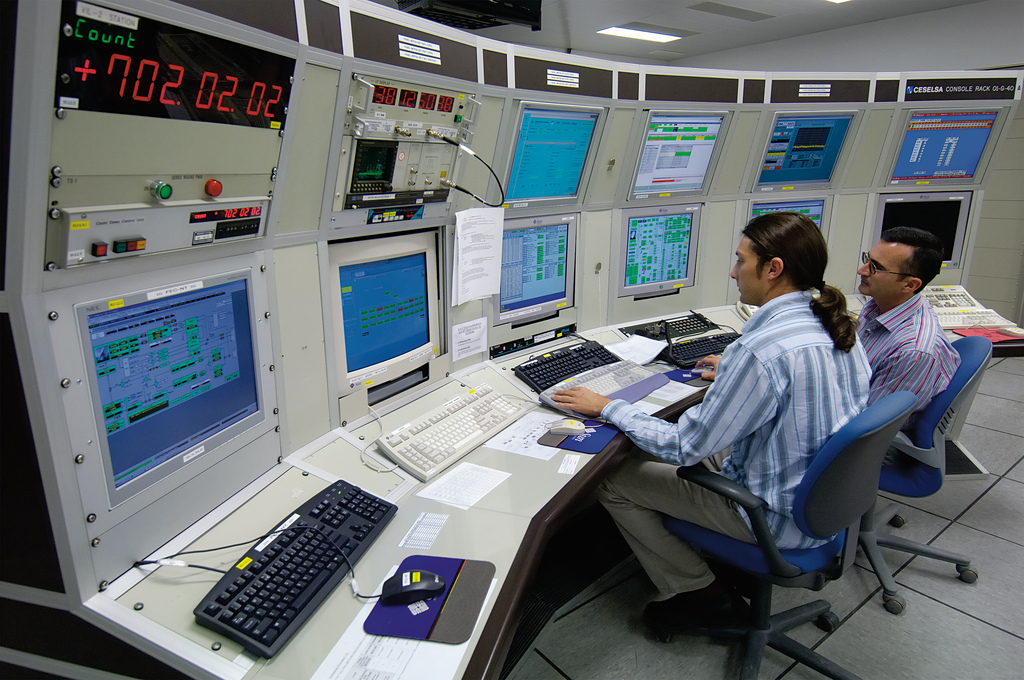
Control station at ESAC, in 2006

Past and present missions handled from ESAC include (in alphabetical order): Akari, BepiColombo, Cassini–Huygens, Cluster, Exomars, Gaia, Herschel Space Observatory, Hubble Space Telescope, ISO, INTEGRAL, IUE, James Webb Space Telescope, LISA Pathfinder, Mars Express, Planck, Rosetta, SOHO, Solar Orbiter, Venus Express, and XMM-Newton.

Future missions include:Athena, Euclid, JUICE, and Plato.

In addition to deep space and solar system exploration, ESAC hosts the data processing of SMOS, a satellite observing the Earth, and the CESAR educational programme.

ESAC is also involved in ESA missions conducted in collaboration with other space agencies. One example is Akari, a Japanese-led mission to carry out an infrared sky survey, launched on 21 February 2006. Collaborative programmes include the NASA-led James Webb Space Telescope, the successor to the Hubble Space Telescope.

== Communications ==
An ESA radio ground station for communication with spacecraft is located in Cebreros, Avila, about 90 km from Madrid and 65 km from ESAC. This installation provides essential support to the activities of ESAC. Inaugurated in September 2005, Cebreros has a 35-metre antenna used to communicate with distant missions to Mercury, Venus, Mars and beyond.

The Madrid Deep Space Communications Complex is also located nearby, operated by the Instituto Nacional de Técnica Aeroespacial. It is a station of the Deep Space Network used primarily for NASA missions, but sometimes supplements Cebreros in communicating with ESA spacecraft. It has a 70-metre antenna, six 34-m antennae and one 26-m antenna.

Two 15-metre radio antennae are located on the ESAC site, but were decommissioned in 2017.

== Other facilities ==
ESAC also hosts a branch of the Spanish Astrobiology Center (CAB).

== See also ==
- Facilities of the European Space Agency
