= Far-infrared Outgoing Radiation Understanding and Monitoring =

Planned ESA satellite to study Earth's radiation budget

FORUM
- Mission type: Earth observing satellite
- Operator: ESA
- Website: https://www.esa.int/Applications/Observing_the_Earth/FutureEO/FORUM

Spacecraft properties
- Manufacturer: Airbus

Start of mission
- Launch date: 2028 (planned)
- Launch site: Kourou

Orbital parameters
- Reference system: Geocentric
- Regime: Sun-synchronous
- ESA insingia FutureEO

FORUM (Far-infrared Outgoing Radiation Understanding and Monitoring) is a European Earth observing satellite that is scheduled to launch in 2028. The FORUM mission is led by the European Space Agency (ESA) and has as its main goal the study of the Earth's radiation budget. It is expected that FORUM's measurements will be improving climate models and offer new insights into the way climate change is affecting the planet. The mission is expected to cost a maximum of 260 million euros.

== Background ==
The main scientific purpose of FORUM is to better understand the Earth's radiation budget - the balance between the incoming radiation mostly from the Sun at short wavelengths, and outgoing radiation, which is a combination of reflected radiation from the Sun and radiation emitted by the Earth system, much of it a longer wavelengths - and the way this exchange is affected by the changes in the Earth's atmosphere caused by human activity.

FORUM will especially be measuring the long-wavelength outgoing energy, which is strongly influenced by water vapour and thin ice clouds in the Earth's atmosphere. According to available data, about 50 percent of the total energy emitted by the Earth is in this long-wavelength range, but these emissions were not monitored in detail from space until now.

These insights will offer a better understanding of the climatic changes taking place on Earth and improve climate predictions. According to ESA, the FORUM mission was selected over SKIM specifically because it promises to "fill in a critical missing piece of the climate jigsaw".

== Timeline ==
- In November 2017, ESA has chosen FORUM and SKIM, to compete to be the ninth Earth Explorer mission.
- On 24 September 2019, ESA announced that FORUM was selected to become the ninth Earth Explorer mission, beating the Sea surface KInematics Multiscale monitoring (SKIM) proposal following a two-year feasibility study phase.
- In June 2022, ESA has awarded a contract worth €160 million to Airbus in the UK to build the FORUM satellite.
- In August 2023, Airbus has completed the Preliminary Design Review of the satellite.
- In December 2024, ESA has signed a contract with Avio for the launch of FORUM on a Vega-C rocket in late 2027.
- In May 2026, the primary infrared detectors were delivered for integration. The secondary thermal infrared detectors were delivered the following month.

== See also ==
- List of Earth observation satellites
- List of European Space Agency programmes and missions
- European Space Agency
- Living Planet Programme:
  - GOCE
  - SMOS
  - CryoSat & CryoSat-2
  - Swarm
  - ADM-Aeolus
  - EarthCARE
  - FLEX
  - BIOMASS
