= SCOS 2000 =

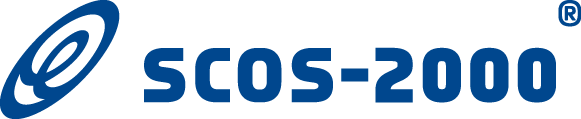
SCOS-2000 Logo

The Satellite Control and Operation System 2000 (SCOS-2000) is the generic satellite Mission Control System (MCS) software infrastructure developed and maintained by the European Space Agency (ESA/ESOC) in collaboration with European industry and deployed for missions such as Radarsat 2, XMM-Newton, INTEGRAL, Cryosat, Mars Express, Venus Express, GOCE, Herschel, Planck, Rosetta, Cryosat-2, Galileo, MetOp (EUMETSAT Polar System), LISA Pathfinder, SWARM, Gaia, SENTINEL spacecraft, EXOMARS orbiters, METEOSAT Third Generation, Aeolus, BepiColombo, SOLO or EUCLID. Upcoming missions that will deploy SCOS-2000 include MetOp-SG (EUMETSAT Polar System Second Generation) and EarthCARE.

It is a generic system, tailored for the specific needs of each mission, being the main purpose to minimize the development of the MCS for each of the new upcoming missions, sharing between them as much of the functionality as possible in order to have common lines of software maintenance. The core of the system provides comprehensive telemetry processing, manual and automatic commanding, on-board software management, mission archive and web-based data distribution.

SCOS-2000 is part of ESA suite for mission control systems components (MICONYS).

== Functionality ==
A MCS provides the means for the satellite operators to monitor and control one or more satellites. The MCS does not provide science data processing, which is typically performed at a dedicated science centre.

=== Commanding Chain ===
The commanding chain is based on the CCSDS Frame standard. Command stacks can be loaded either manually or automatically, and are validated against predefined constraints prior to release.

=== Telemetry Chain ===
The telemetry chain is based on the CCSDS Frame and the CCSDS Packet standards. CCSDS frames are received from the ground station through a Space Link Extension (SLE) interface and demultiplexed into telemetry packets.

Typical functions performed on receipt of a telemetry packet include checking the parameters are within range (hard and soft limit checking) and validation of sent telecommands.

=== Archive ===
The system provides fully automated packet and parameter archives, capable of managing the high data volumes of modern missions.

== Licensing ==
SCOS-2000 is owned and licensed by ESA. It is available to European space industry under different licensing terms. Products developed based on SCOS-2000 can be exported to non-European countries.

== History ==
The development timeline of SCOS-2000 has been;

- Release 1.0.
- Release 2.2.
- Release 2.3.
- Release 2.3e.
- Release 2.4.
- Release 2.4.1.
- Release 3.0.
- Release 3.1.
- Release 4.0.
- Release 5.0.
- Release 5.4.
- Release 5.5.
- Release 6.0

== Comparison with earlier systems ==
SCOS-2000 is the latest in a line of generic mission control systems developed by ESA. Some of the source code is based on ESA's previous control system, called SCOS-II. SCOS-II itself was not widely used, with the Huygens and SOHO missions being the main users.

== Spin Offs ==
SCOS-2000 has been used as a core part of the GSMC (Ground Station Monitoring and Control).

EUTELSAT NEO is also based on SCOS-2000, as well as many other mission control systems used for commercial satellite missions like Hifly (GMV product) or the MCS component from Pleniter (CGI product).

Meteosat Second Generation spacecraft are controlled using a derivation of the core components from SCOS in their specific Mission Control System (MSG Central Facility) developed by CGI.

== Suppliers ==
- CGI
- SCISYS
- GMV
- Terma
- Telespazio VEGA
- CS Communication & Systèmes

== Evolution ==
SCOS has been used for more than two decades as the official MCS baseline in any ESA mission. From 2020, it is intended that all new ESA missions will start to use the European Ground Systems Common Core (abbreviated as EGS-CC) as the baseline platform for future MCS development (EGOS-CC based MCS), JUICE being the first official mission to use this new common framework.

EGS-CC is a new complete project currently under implementation phase financed by all the relevant space agencies in Europe (ESA, CNES, DLR) as well as involving the biggest space prime contractors in the continent (Airbus Defence And Space, Thales Alenia Space or OHB). It will also involve most of the subcontractors working with SCOS like the ones previously mentioned.
