= CryoSat-2 =

European Space Agency environmental research satellite

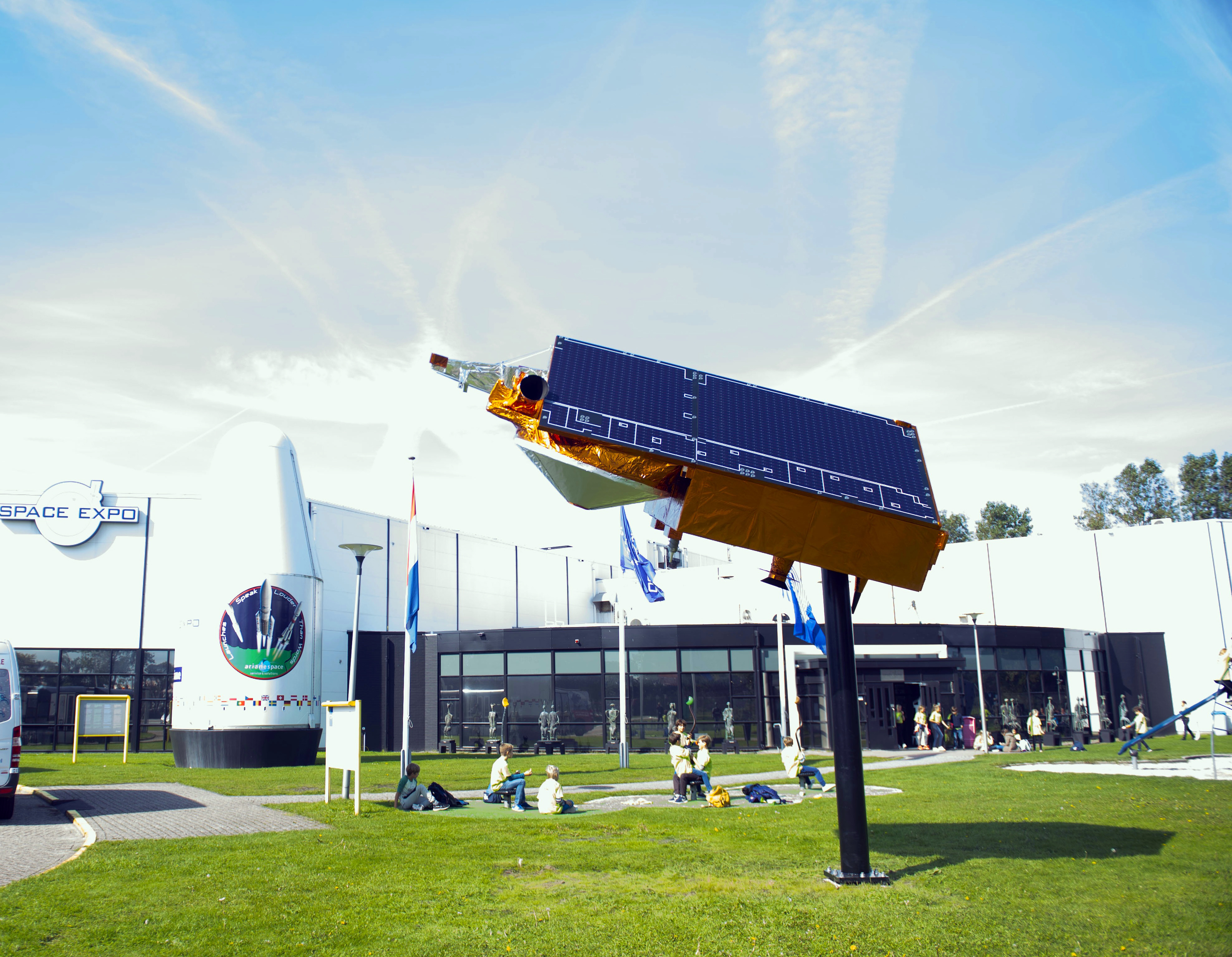
- Life-size model of CryoSat
- Mission type: Earth observation
- Operator: ESA
- COSPAR ID: 2010-013A
- SATCAT no.: 36508
- Website: www.esa.int/Applications/Observing_the_Earth/FutureEO/CryoSat
- Mission duration: 3 years (planned); Elapsed: 16 years, 5 months, 27 days

Spacecraft properties
- Manufacturer: EADS Astrium
- Launch mass: 720 kilograms (1,590 lb)
- Dry mass: 684 kilograms (1,508 lb)
- Dimensions: 4.6 by 2.3 metres (15.1 ft × 7.5 ft)
- Power: 850 watts

Start of mission
- Launch date: 8 April 2010, 13:57:04 UTC
- Rocket: Dnepr
- Launch site: Baikonur 109/95
- Contractor: ISC Kosmotras

Orbital parameters
- Reference system: Geocentric
- Regime: Low Earth
- Perigee altitude: 718 kilometres (446 mi)
- Apogee altitude: 732 kilometres (455 mi)
- Inclination: 92.03 degrees
- Period: 99.16 minutes
- Epoch: 24 January 2015, 20:44:24 UTC

Transponders
- Band: S Band (TT&C support); X Band (science data acquisition)
- Bandwidth: 8kbit/s download (S Band); 100 Mbit/s download (X Band); 2 kbit/s upload (S Band)
Instruments
- DORIS: Doppler Orbitography and Radiopositioning Integration by Satellite
- LRR: Laser Retroreflector
- SIRAL: SAR Interferometer Radar Altimeter
- ESA insignia (2020s) FutureEO

CryoSat-2 is a European Space Agency (ESA) Earth Explorer Mission that launched on April 8, 2010. CryoSat-2 is dedicated to measuring polar sea ice thickness and monitoring changes in ice sheets. Its primary objective is to measure the thinning of Arctic sea ice, but has applications to other regions and scientific purposes, such as Antarctica and oceanography.

CryoSat-2 was built as a replacement for CryoSat-1, which failed to reach orbit following a launch failure in October 2005. CryoSat-2 was successfully launched five years later in 2010, with upgraded software aiming to measure changes in ice thickness to an accuracy of ~10% of the expected interannual variation. Unlike previous satellite altimetry missions, CryoSat-2 provides unparalleled Arctic coverage, reaching 88˚N (previous missions were limited to 81.5˚N).

The primary payload of the mission is a synthetic aperture radar (SAR) Interferometric Radar Altimeter (SIRAL), which measures surface elevation. By subtracting the difference between the surface height of the ocean and the surface height of sea ice, the sea ice freeboard (the portion of ice floating above the sea surface) can be calculated. Freeboard can be converted to sea ice thickness by assuming the sea ice is floating in hydrostatic equilibrium.

CryoSat-2 is part of ESA's wider CryoSat mission in the Living Planet Programme. The spacecraft was constructed by EADS Astrium, and launched by ISC Kosmotras using a Dnepr carrier rocket.

== Mission objectives ==
=== Original Objectives ===
The aim of the CryoSat mission is to determine ice thickness variations on Earth's ice sheets and marine ice cover. Its primary objective is to measure Arctic sea ice thickness, testing the hypothesis that Arctic sea ice is thinning due to climate change. Furthermore, the mission aims to monitor ice thickness changes in Antarctica and Greenland, to determine their contribution to sea level rise. The mission objectives can be summarised as:

- Determine trends in Arctic sea ice thickness
- Determine the contribution that Antarctica and Greenland are making to sea level rise
- Observe variability in Arctic and Antarctic sea ice thickness
- Observe changes in the thickness of Earth's ice caps and glaciers

=== Extended Objectives ===
CryoSat achieved its initial mission objectives following the launch of CryoSat-2, and therefore the mission was extended with new objectives.

- Assess the spatial and temporal variability of ice sheet margins, glaciers, and ice caps
- Investigate oceanic variations in the Polar regions
- Examine product contribution to operational and forecasting services
- Extend the current data record to ensure mission continuity
- Assess how snow fall and surface ice melting contribute to cryosphere meteorology
- Retrieve sea ice thickness estimates in Antarctica oceans
- Observe inland water variations

== Mission timeline ==
=== Background ===
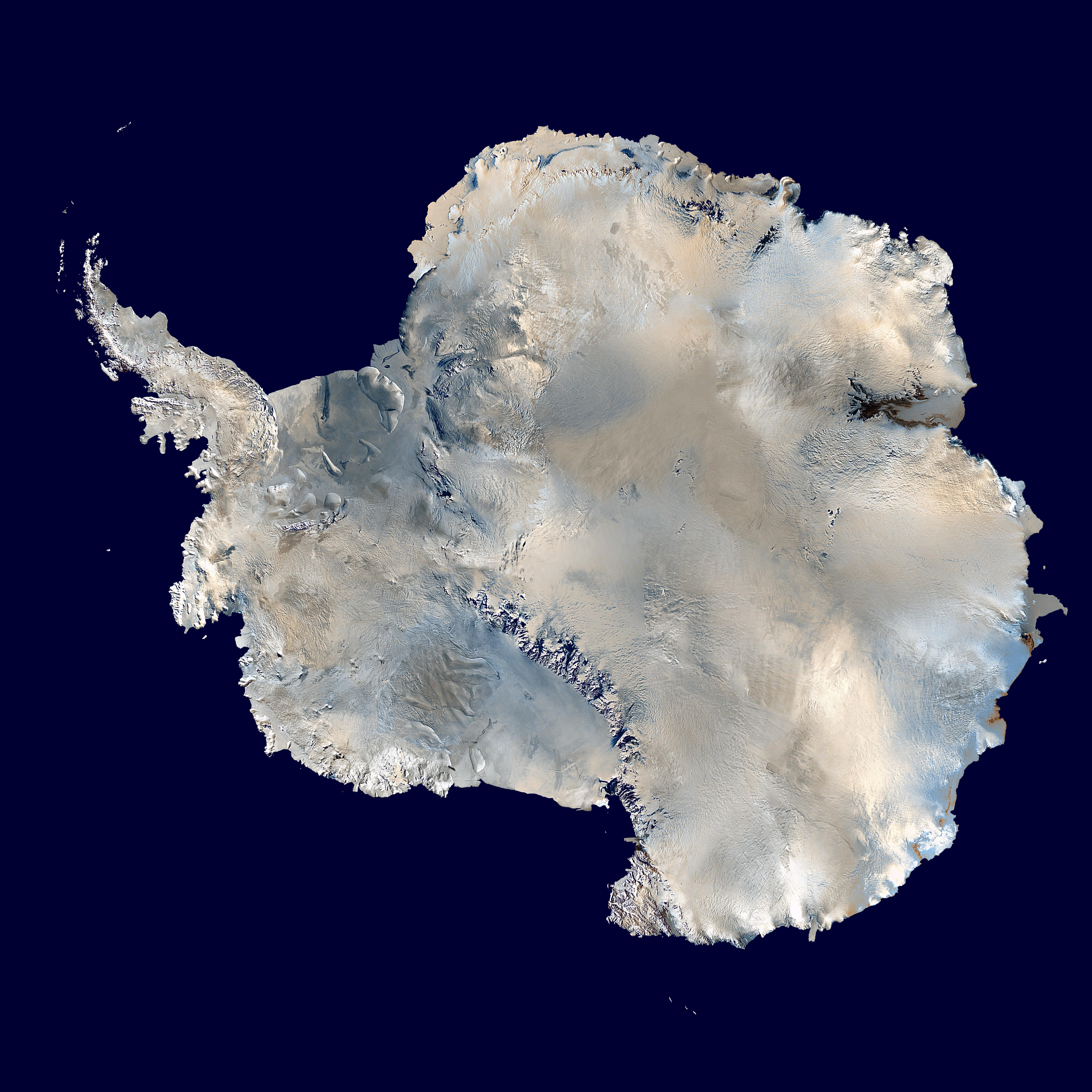
Antarctica; CryoSat-2 is designed to study Earth's polar ice caps

The initial proposal for the CryoSat programme was submitted as part of a call for proposals in July 1998 for Earth Explorer missions as part of the European Space Agency's Living Planet programme. It was selected for further studies in 1999, and following completion of a feasibility study the mission was authorised. The construction phase began in 2001, and in 2002 EADS Astrium was awarded a contract to build the spacecraft. A contract was also signed with Eurockot, to conduct the launch of the satellite using a Rokot/Briz-KM carrier rocket.

Construction of the original spacecraft was completed in August 2004. Following testing, the spacecraft was shipped to the Plesetsk Cosmodrome in Russia during August 2005 and arrived on 1 September. The launch occurred from Site 133/3 on 8 October; however, due to a missing command in the rocket's flight control system, the second-stage engine did not shut down at the end of its planned burn, and instead the stage burned to depletion. This prevented the second stage and Briz-KM from separating, and as a result the rocket failed to achieve orbit. The spacecraft was lost when it reentered over the Arctic Ocean, north of Greenland.

Due to the importance of the CryoSat mission for understanding global warming and reductions in polar ice caps, a replacement satellite was proposed. The development of CryoSat-2 was authorised in February 2006, less than five months after the failure. CryoSat successfully achieved its mission objectives following the launch of CryoSat-2.

=== Development ===
Like its predecessor, CryoSat-2 was constructed by EADS Astrium, with its main instrument being built by Thales Alenia Space. Construction and testing of the spacecraft's primary instrument was completed by February 2008, when it was shipped for integration with the rest of the spacecraft. In August 2009, the spacecraft's ground infrastructure, which had been redesigned since the original mission, was declared ready for use. Construction and testing of the spacecraft had been completed by mid-September. The Project Manager for the CryoSat-2 mission was Richard Francis, who had been the Systems Manager on the original CryoSat mission.

CryoSat-2 is an almost-identical copy of the original spacecraft, however modifications were made including the addition of a backup radar altimeter. In total, 85 improvements were made to the spacecraft when it was rebuilt.

=== Mission preparations ===
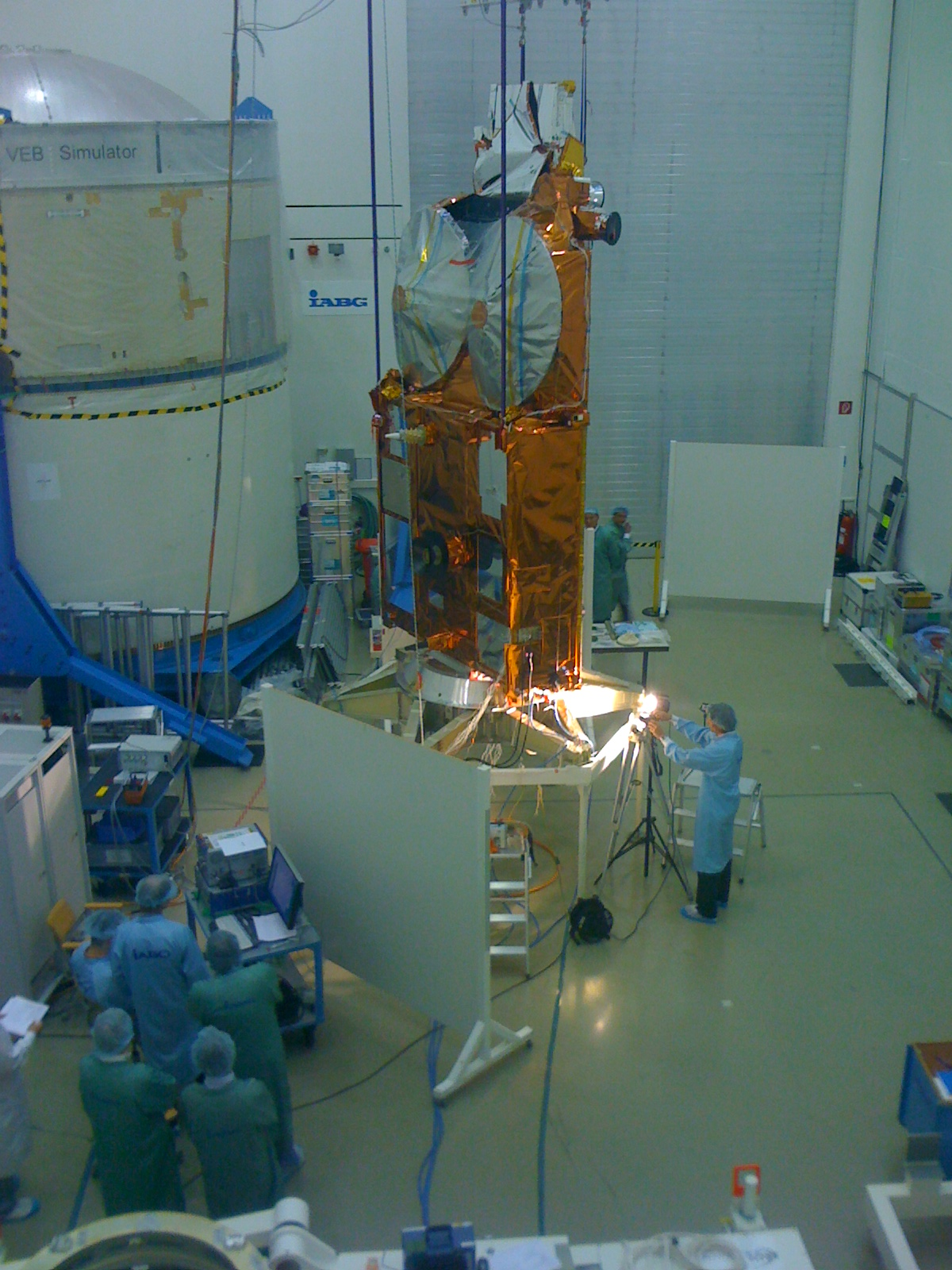
CryoSat-2 undergoing testing in Germany

When it was approved in February 2006, the launch of CryoSat-2 was planned for March 2009. It was originally planned that like its predecessor it would be launched by a Rokot, however due to a lack of available launches a Dnepr rocket was selected instead. ISC Kosmotras were contracted to perform the launch. Due to delays to earlier missions and range availability problems, the launch was delayed until February 2010.

The Dnepr rocket assigned to launch CryoSat-2 arrived at the Baikonur Cosmodrome by train on 29 December 2009. On 12 January 2010, the first two stages of the rocket were loaded into the launch canister, and the canister was prepared for transportation to the launch site. On 14 January, it was rolled out to Site 109/95, where it was installed into its silo. The next day saw the third stage transported to the silo, and installed atop the rocket.

Following the completion of its construction, CryoSat-2 was placed into storage to await launch. In January 2010, the spacecraft was removed from storage, and shipped to Baikonur for launch. It departed Munich Franz Josef Strauss Airport aboard an Antonov An-124 aircraft on 12 January, and arrived at Baikonur the next day. Following arrival at the launch site, final assembly and testing were conducted.

During final testing, engineers detected that the spacecraft's X band (NATO H/I/J bands) communications antenna was transmitting only a tiny fraction of the power that it should. Thermal imaging showed that the waveguide to the antenna, deep inside the spacecraft, was very hot. Clearly that was where the missing power was being dissipated. The waveguide could not normally be inspected or repaired without major disassembly of the satellite, which would have required a return to the facilities in Europe and resulted in a major delay to the launch. To avoid doing this, a local surgeon was brought in to inspect the component with an endoscope. The surgeon, Tatiana Zykova, discovered that two pieces of ferrite were lodged in the tube, and was able to remove both of them. Engineers were able to assist the removal of the second one with a magnet. It was determined that the ferrite had come from an absorption load installed deep inside the antenna, which was intended to improve its performance. Some ferrite (the remaining stump of this load) was removed from inside the base of the antenna in order to prevent any further debris falling into the waveguide.

On 4 February, the CryoSat-2 spacecraft was fuelled for launch. Then on 10 February it was attached to the payload adaptor, and encapsulated in the payload fairing, to form a unit known as the Space Head Module. This was transported to the launch pad by means of a vehicle known as the crocodile, and installed atop the carrier rocket. Rollout occurred on 15 February, and the next day the satellite was activated in order to test its systems following integration onto the rocket.

=== Launch ===
The launch of CryoSat-2 atop a Dnepr rocket

When the spacecraft was installed atop the Dnepr, launch was scheduled to occur on 25 February, at 13:57 UTC. Prior to this, a practice countdown was scheduled for 19 February. Several hours before the practice was scheduled to begin ISC Kosmotras announced that the launch had been delayed, and as a result the practice did not take place. The delay was caused by a concern that the second stage manoeuvring engines did not have a sufficient quantity of reserve fuel.

Following the delay, the Space Head Module was removed from the rocket, and returned to its integration building on 22 February. Whilst it was in the integration building, daily inspections were made to ensure that the spacecraft was still functioning normally. Once the fuel issue had been resolved, the launch was rescheduled for 8 April, and launch operations resumed. On 1 April, the Space Head Module was returned to the silo, and reinstalled atop the Dnepr. Following integrated tests, the practice countdown was successfully conducted on 6 April.

CryoSat-2 was launched at 13:57:04 UTC on 8 April 2010. Following a successful launch, CryoSat-2 separated from the upper stage of the Dnepr into a low Earth orbit. The first signals from the satellite were detected by a ground station at the Broglio Space Centre in Malindi, Kenya, seventeen minutes after launch.

=== In orbit ===
On 22 October 2010, CryoSat-2 was declared operational following six months of on-orbit testing. The exploitation phase of the mission started on 26 October 2010 under the responsibility of Tommaso Parrinello who is the Mission Manager.

=== Results ===
Sea ice thickness estimates have been produced by the Centre for Polar Observation & Modelling, the Alfred Wegener Institute for Polar and Marine Research, and NASA's Jet Propulsion Laboratory and Goddard Space Flight Center. Arctic sea ice thickness data are available to view and download from the Centre for Polar Observation & Modelling.

Work has been conducted to extend the sea ice thickness record to include summer (May–September). Due to the presence of melt ponds on Arctic sea ice during summer, it has been challenging to distinguish waveform returns into sea ice and sea water. In 2022, a record of Arctic summer sea ice freeboard was generated using a neural network, but it was recognised that more work must be done to resolve sources of uncertainty in the estimates. A subsequent study addressed several of these uncertainties by correcting for melt-pond-related radar bias and accounting for snow loading and retrieval uncertainty, producing a pan-Arctic year-round sea-ice thickness record for 2011–2020.

In 2014, data from CryoSat-2 revealed 25,000 seamounts, with more to come as data is interpreted.

Using a decade of CryoSat-2 data, scientists have identified 85 new subglacial lakes in Antarctica. The findings were published in Nature Communications on 19 September 2025.

== Satellite instruments ==
=== SIRAL ===
The primary payload onboard CryoSat-2 is the SAR Interferometric Radar Altimeter (SIRAL), operating in the Ku-band (13.6 GHz). Unlike the original CryoSat, two SIRAL instruments are installed aboard CryoSat-2, with one serving as a backup in case the other fails. The instrument combines a pulse-limited radar altimeter and a second antenna with synthetic aperture and interferometric signal processing. SIRAL has a pulse bandwidth of 320 MHz. The instrument operates in three modes depending on the surface type being measured; low resolution mode, synthetic aperture radar (SAR) mode, and SAR interferometric (SARIn) mode. Low resolution mode is used over ice sheet interiors and oceans, SAR is used over sea ice and possible oceanographic areas, and SARIn is used around the ice sheet margins and mountain glaciers.

==== Low Resolution Mode ====
Low resolution mode operates in a conventional, pulse-limited mode; the area of surface seen by the instrument is limited by the length of the radar pulse transmitted by the altimeter. A single antenna transmits and receives the radar signal. This mode ensures returning echoes are uncorrelated.

The low resolution mode footprint is approximately 1.7 km. The pulse repetition frequency in this mode is 1.97 kHz.

==== SAR ====
In SAR mode, SIRAL emits a burst of 64 pulses, separated into narrow along-track beams by exploiting the Doppler Effect. Each strip is ~250 m wide, and the interval between bursts means each ground location is measured multiple times, improving accuracy.

The SAR footprint is approximately 0.31 km along-track and 1.67 km across-track. The pulse repetition frequency in this mode is 18.181 kHz.

==== SARIn ====
In SARIn mode, the two antennae are used to account for surface slope. The two antennae, mounted 1 m apart, receive the echo almost simultaneously. If the return signal returns from off-nadir, then it is possible to measure the angle between the baseline and echo direction, therefore estimating surface slope.

=== DORIS ===
The Doppler Orbit and Radio Positioning Integration (DORIS) is the second instrument on CryoSat-2, and calculates precisely the spacecraft's orbit. An array of retroreflectors are also carried aboard the spacecraft, and allow measurements to be made from the ground to verify the orbital data provided by DORIS.

Following launch, CryoSat-2 was placed into a low Earth orbit with a perigee of 720 kilometres (450 mi), an apogee of 732 kilometres (455 mi), 92 degrees of inclination and an orbital period of 99.2 minutes. It had a mass at launch of 750 kilograms (1,650 lb), and has surpassed it's expected life of three years.

Launch and Early Orbit Phase operations were completed in the morning of 11 April 2010, and SIRAL was activated later the same day. At 14:40 UTC, the spacecraft returned its first scientific data. Initial data on ice thickness was presented by the mission's Lead Investigator, Duncan Wingham, at the 2010 Living Planet Symposium on 1 July. Later the same month, data was made available to scientists for the first time. The spacecraft underwent six months of on-orbit testing and commissioning, which concluded with a review on 22 October 2010 that found the spacecraft was operating as expected, and that it was ready to begin operations.

== Supporting measurements: CRYOVEX ==
It was clear from the beginning of the CryoSat programme that an extensive series of measurements would be needed, both to understand interaction of the radar waves with the surface of the ice caps and to relate the measured freeboard of floating sea ice with its thickness. This latter, in particular, would have to take account of snow loading. For sea ice, which moves as it is blown by the wind, it was also necessary to develop techniques which could give consistent results when measured from platforms travelling at different speed (scientists on the surface, helicopter-towed sounders, aircraft-borne radars and CryoSat itself). A number of campaigns were performed under a programme called CRYOVEX which aimed to address each of the identified areas of uncertainty. These campaigns continued through the development of the original CryoSat and were planned to continue after its launch.

Following the announcement that CryoSat-2 would be built the CRYOVEX programme was extended. Experiments were conducted in Antarctica to determine how snow could affect its readings, and to provide data for calibrating the satellite. In January 2007 the European Space Agency issued a request for proposals for further calibration and validation experiments. Further CryoVEx experiments were conducted on Svalbard in 2007, followed by a final expedition to Greenland and the Devon Ice Cap in 2008. Additional snow measurements were provided by the Arctic Arc Expedition, and the Alfred Wegener Institute's Airborne Synthetic Aperture and Interferometric Radar Altimeter System (ASIRAS) instrument, mounted aboard a Dornier 228 aircraft.

== See also ==
- List of Earth observation satellites
- List of ESA programmes and missions
- ESA's Living Planet Programme
  - SMOS
  - GOCE
  - CryoSat
  - Swarm
  - ADM-Aeolus
  - EarthCARE
  - BIOMASS
  - FLEX
- ICESat (NASA)
