= Sophie Nowicki =

Physical scientist

- Born: France
- Education: University of Edinburgh (BSc Geophysics MSc Remote sensing and image processing) University College London(PhD Glaciology)
- Scientific career
- Institutions: University at Buffalo - Department of Geology NASA Goddard

Sophie Marie Jeanne Nowicki, is Empire Innovation Professor in the Department of Geology of the University at Buffalo. She does research on the Greenland and Antarctic ice sheets, focusing on their connections to global climate and sea level. Before that, she was physical scientist at the Nasa Goddard Space Flight Centre, investigating ice sheet changes.

In 2022, an ice-covered foreland in West Antarctica was named Nowicki-foreland in recognition of Nowicki's role in increasing understanding of sea level rise.

== Background and Education ==
Sophie Nowciki was born in northern France to a French mother and American father, both of whom were environmental scientists. Despite originally wanting to be an artist or architect, her parents encouraged her to pursue science.

Following a BSc in Geophysics at the University of Edinburgh, Nowicki completed an MSc in Remote Sensing and Image Processing, where her Master's thesis was supervised by Chris Merchant. Her PhD thesis, entitled 'Modelling the transition zone of marine ice sheets' was completed in the Centre for Polar Observation and Modelling at University College London (UCL), under the supervision of Duncan Wingham.

== Career ==
After completing her PhD, Nowicki first remained at UCL for a postdoctoral position.

She was a research scientist at NASA Goddard from 2009 tot 2020. She was Principal Investigator on a National Science Foundation project investigating Ocean-Ice Interaction in the Amundsen Sea, which concluded in 2011.

Nowicki was Deputy Chief for the Cryospheric Sciences Laboratory and co-leader of the steering committee for the Ice Sheet Model Intercomparison Project for CMIP6. She was the official responsible for the Cryosphere Model Comparison Tool. During her time at NASA she worked in Operation IceBridge, and co-led the international SeaRISE (Sea-Level Response to Ice Sheet Evolution) project looking at the sensitivity of ice sheets to external environmental forcings. She was a member of the Community Earth System Model (CESM) Scientific Steering Committee (SSC) and an executive committee member for the Ice Sheet Mass Balance Intercomparison Exercise phase 2 (IMBIE2).

In August 2020, Nowicki became Empire Innovation Professor at the Department of Geology of the University at Buffalo, USA. She does research on the Greenland and Antarctic ice sheets, focusing on their connections to global climate and sea level. Her work takes in local processes in ice sheets as well as continental models, and the impact of ice sheet changes on sea levels. She is also interested in improving polar climate models.

Nowicki is a Member of the World Climate Research Programme Sea Level Change and Coastal Impacts Chand Challenge and a Lead author for the IPCC AR6 Chapter 9 “Ocean, cryosphere, and sea level change”

Her work often attracts media attention because of her investigations into and comments on climate change. She has spoken to news groups including Yahoo News and Florida Weekly and recorded a NASA Google+ Hangout on sea level rise.

She credits climate scientist Gavin Schmidt as her unofficial mentor.

In 2022, an ice-covered foreland in West Antarctica was named Nowicki-foreland in recognition of Nowicki's role in increasing understanding of sea level rise. The UK Antarctic Place-names Committee approved the term “Nowicki Foreland” to refer to a “high, ice-covered foreland 9 kilometers wide and 30 kilometers long, forming the eastern arm of the Martin Peninsula on the coast of Marie Byrd Land.”
