= Aeolus-2 =

Future European weather satellite

- Names: EPS-Aeolus
- Operator: ESA, EUMETSAT

Spacecraft properties
- Manufacturer: Airbus Defence and Space

Start of mission
- Launch date: 2034 (planned)

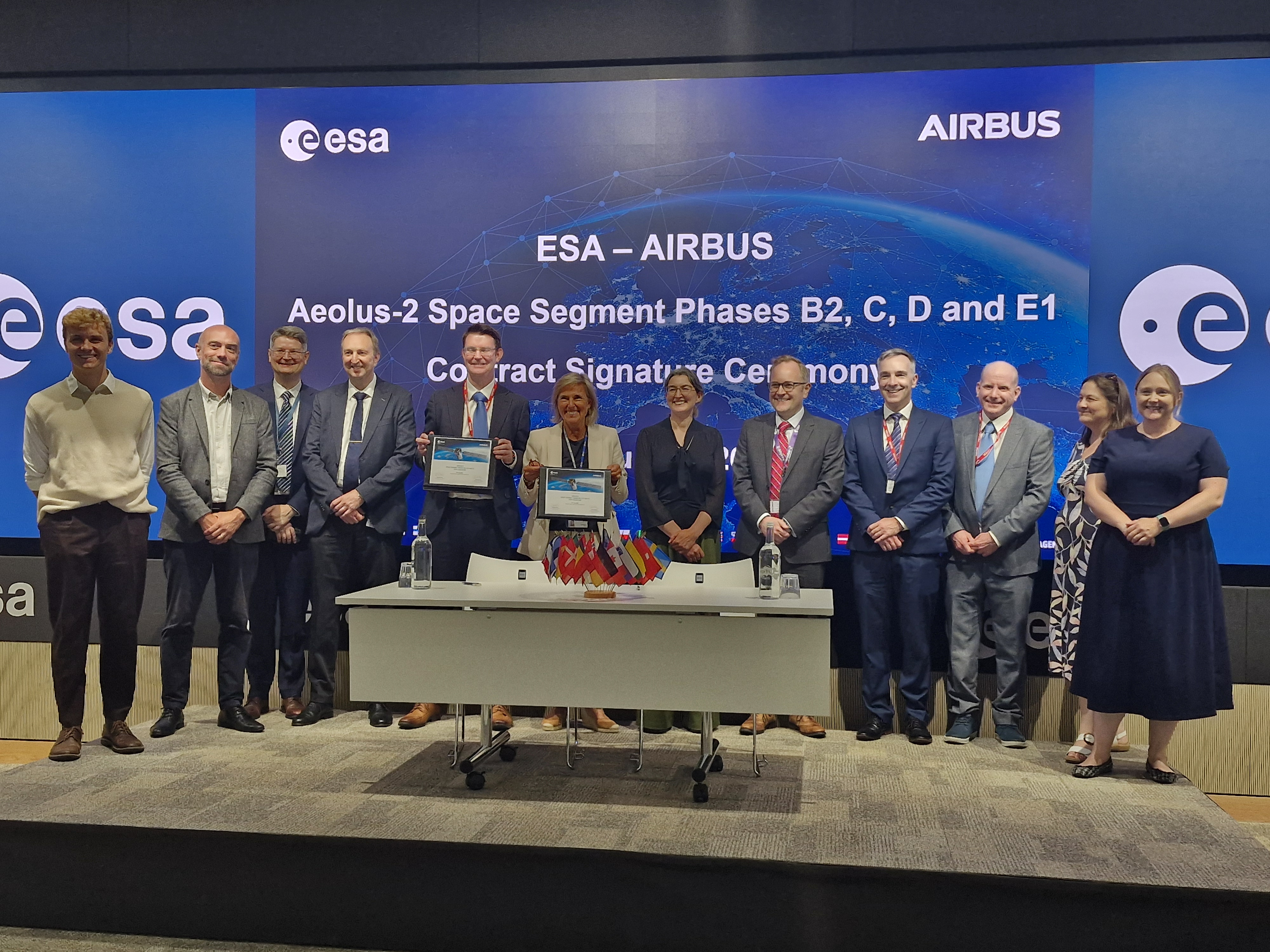
June 2026: ESA authorises Airbus to begin Aeolus-2 development

Aeolus-2 is a future European meteorological satellite under development by Airbus for the European Space Agency (ESA) and EUMETSAT. Its goal is to provide continuous global wind profiles for improving weather forecasting and climate monitoring. Aeolus-2 is an operation follow-up mission of ADM-Aeolus launched in 2018. It will use a Doppler wind lidar with two lasers building upon heritage of ADM-Aeolus and EarthCARE. It is expected to launch in 2034.

== See also ==
- List of European Space Agency programmes and missions
