= SMOS =

SMOS may refer to:

- Soil Moisture and Ocean Salinity satellite, launched by the European Space Agency in fall 2009
- Special Minister of State, a minister in Australia
