= Beyond Gravity =

Swiss aerospace company

- Company type: Joint-stock company
- Industry: Space
- Headquarters: Zürich, Switzerland
- Key people: Andre Wall (CEO)
- Revenue: Fr339 million (US$341 million) (2019)
- Number of employees: 1,265 (2019)
- Website: beyondgravity.com

Beyond Gravity is the space-oriented segment of the Swiss technology group RUAG. At a total of thirteen sites in Switzerland (Bern, Zurich, Emmen and Nyon), Sweden (Gothenburg, Linköping), Finland (Tampere), USA (Titusville, Decatur), Austria (Vienna, Berndorf) and Portugal (Lisbon), Beyond Gravity employs around 1,265 people and posted sales of 339 million Swiss Francs in 2019. As a supplier of Arianespace, Beyond Gravity is also a shareholder, with 0.82% of capital in 2018.

== History ==
Formally known as RUAG Space. Beyond Gravity is a segment of the Swiss technology group RUAG, with locations in Switzerland, Sweden, Finland, Germany, USA and Austria.

The company began in the late 1970s as a subcontractor of Oerlikon Contraves (later named Oerlikon Space) carrying out final assembly of payload fairings for Ariane rockets. These activities took place at Emmen, Switzerland. Over the years, it expanded primarily through acquisitions. First, the Swiss government owned company took over the companies Mecanex (Nyon) and HTS (Wallisellen). In 2008, it acquired the Swedish SAAB Space and its subsidiary Austrian Aerospace.

In the following years, the company expanded further. In 2015 a site in Tampere, Finland was acquired. The facility in Finland has 40 employees. By 2015, RUAG Space USA (later named Beyond Gravity USA) had 4 sites in 4 different states. In 2018, 109 employees were working in the United States at sites in Decatur, Alabama; Titusville, Florida; and Denver (Centennial), Colorado. During 2016 the company HTS GmbH in Coswig near Dresden was acquired as the first site in Germany. After a two-year consolidation period, the name was changed to RUAG Space Germany GmbH.

In 2018, the Swedish branch of the company, RUAG Space AB (later named Beyond Gravity AB), had 332 employees in Gothenburg and 120 employees in Linköping, with two subsidiaries in Austria and Finland. This branch specializes in related equipment, for example on-board computer systems, antennas and microwave electronics for satellites and adapters and separation systems for launchers. The company headquarters is located in Gothenborg, Sweden and a division for mechanical systems is situated in Linköping, Sweden. In May 2015, the company had 415 employees. It was originally started as a joint venture between SAAB and Ericsson as Saab Ericsson Space until Ericsson sold its stake to SAAB together with Saab Microwave Systems in 2006.

On May 1, 2022, to reflect the change of visions of the company and the focus towards the highly dynamic space sector, RUAG Space was re-branded to Beyond Gravity.

As a result of its European origins, Beyond Gravity has been part of many European space missions, but is also building a US market presence. Notable scientific spacecraft to use Beyond Gravity components include the Herschel Space Observatory, Planck, Soil Moisture and Ocean Salinity, BepiColombo, Galileo, Solar Orbiter, Automated Transfer Vehicle, Aeolus, and ICESat2.

== Payload fairings ==
Beyond Gravity manufactures payload fairings for a number of launchers including a 5.4-metre-wide (18 ft) design in common use across the Ariane 6, H3 (W-type faring), Terran R, and Vulcan Centaur. It also makes smaller fairings for the Atlas V and Vega C.

A payload fairing protects the payload from the environment during the ascent, ensuring cleanliness and limiting its exposure to the intense noise, vibration and aerodynamic pressure occurring during launch. Once the dynamic pressure and thermal fluxes fall below a threshold, this structure separates via explosives from the launch vehicle, exposing the payload and reducing the mass of the still accelerating vehicle.

Payload fairings consist of a sandwich structure, with a core of aluminum honeycomb and facesheets of carbon fiber reinforced polymer. Whereas previous processes relied on autoclaves to cure the composite material, since 2016 the company transitioned to an Out-of-autoclave approach. With this approach, each fairing half-shell is cured in an industrial oven as one single piece. In addition to increasing the structural efficiency, this approach reduces the processing steps as it consolidates all parts at once: inner and outer skins, honeycomb sandwich core, and external cork-based thermal protection system.
