= Swarm (spacecraft) =

ESA's space program to study Earth's magnetic field

- Artist's view of the three Swarm spacecraft
- Mission type: Earth's magnetic field observation
- Operator: ESA
- COSPAR ID: SWARM A: 2013-067B; SWARM B: 2013-067A; SWARM C: 2013-067C
- SATCAT no.: SWARM A: 39452; SWARM B: 39451; SWARM C: 39453
- Website: ESA Swarm homepage
- Mission duration: 4 years (planned); 12 years, 8 months, 1 day (elapsed)

Spacecraft properties
- Manufacturer: Astrium
- Launch mass: 468 kg
- Dry mass: 369 kg
- Dimensions: 9.1 m × 1.5 m × 0.85 m
- Power: 608 watts

Start of mission
- Launch date: 22 November 2013, 12:02:29 UTC
- Rocket: Rokot/Briz-KM
- Launch site: Plesetsk, Site 133/3
- Contractor: Eurockot

Orbital parameters
- Reference system: Geocentric
- Regime: Polar orbit
- Perigee altitude: Swarm A: ≤460 kilometres (290 mi); Swarm C: ≤460 kilometres (290 mi); Swarm B: ≤530 kilometres (330 mi)
- Apogee altitude: Swarm A: ≤460 kilometres (290 mi); Swarm C: ≤460 kilometres (290 mi); Swarm B: ≤530 kilometres (330 mi)
- Inclination: Swarm A: 87.3° Swarm C: 87.3° Swarm B: 87.7°
- Mean motion: 15

Transponders
- Band: S Band
- Frequency: 2 GHz
- Bandwidth: 6Mbit/s download 4 kbit/s upload

Instruments
- VFM: Vector Field Magnetometer; ASM: Absolute Scalar Magnetometer; EFI: Electric Field Instrument; ACC: Accelerometer; LRR: Laser Range Reflector
- ESA insignia (2020s) FutureEO

Swarm is a European Space Agency (ESA) mission to study the Earth's magnetic field. High-precision and high-resolution measurements of the strength, direction and variations of the Earth's magnetic field, complemented by precise navigation, accelerometer and electric field measurements, will provide data for modelling the geomagnetic field and its interaction with other physical aspects of the Earth system. The results offer a view of the inside of the Earth from space, enabling the composition and processes of the interior to be studied in detail and increase our knowledge of atmospheric processes and ocean circulation patterns that affect climate and weather.

== Overview ==
The overall objective of the Swarm mission is to build on the experience from the Ørsted and CHAMP missions and to provide a survey of the geomagnetic field (multi-point measurements) and its temporal evolution, to gain new insights into the Earth system by improving our understanding of the Earth's interior and climate.

The Swarm constellation consists of three satellites (Alpha, Bravo and Charlie) placed in two different polar orbits, two flying side by side at an altitude of 450 kilometres (280 mi) and a third at an altitude of 530 kilometres (330 mi). The launch was delayed and rescheduled to 12:02:29 UTC on 22 November 2013, from Plesetsk Cosmodrome, Russia. ESA contracted Astrium to develop and build the three orbiters, while Eurockot provided the launch services.

Through a Canadian-European partnership, the Canadian Space Agency's CASSIOPE satellite's e-POP instrument suite was formally integrated as the fourth satellite in the Swarm constellation in 2018, joining Alpha, Bravo, and Charlie as Echo.

== Scientific objectives ==
Primary objectives:

- Earth core dynamics, geodynamo processes, and core-mantle interaction
- Lithospheric magnetization and its geological interpretation
- 3D electrical conductivity of the mantle
- Currents flowing in the magnetosphere and ionosphere

Secondary objectives:

- Identification of the ocean circulation by its magnetic signature
- Quantification of the magnetic forcing of the upper atmosphere

== Instruments ==
The payload of the three spacecraft consists of the following instruments:

- Vector Field Magnetometer (VFM): Linear and low-noise measurements of the Earth's magnetic field vector components. The fluxgate vector magnetometer is similar to the ones in the satellites Ørsted, CHAMP and SAC-C.
- Absolute Scalar Magnetometer (ASM): its main goal is the calibration of the main instrument VFM. It consist in a scalar optically pumped magnetometer based on metastable helium-4 designed by CEA-Leti.
- Electric Field Instrument (EFI): Measurement of ion density, drift velocity, and electric field. EFI consist of two components, the Langmuir Probe (LP) and the Thermal Ion Imager (TII).
- Accelerometer (ACC): Measurement of non-gravitational accelerations like air-drag, winds, Earth albedo and solar radiation pressure. ACC was developed by VZLU in Czechia.
- Laser Range Reflector (LRR): Reflecting quartz prisms as part of the satellite laser ranging network.

== Mission history ==
=== Launch campaign ===
The three Swarm satellites arrived at the Plesetsk Cosmodrome in September 2013 to begin final testing before fueling and incorporation with the Rokot launch vehicle. The Swarm constellation was successfully launched aboard Rokot/Briz-KM on 22 November 2013.

=== In orbit ===
The constellation is controlled by the European Space Operations Centre in Darmstadt, Germany. By the beginning of May 2014, Swarm had finished its in-orbit commissioning. Preliminary data indicates that the constellation is performing well as data received closely matches that from a previous German mission, CHAMP.

During the commissioning stage problems were discovered with the backup Magnetometer on the "Charlie" satellite, which led to "Bravo" satellite being placed in the lone high altitude orbit (510 km) and "Charlie" joining "Alpha" in the lower tandem orbit (462 km) to improve the resilience of the constellation. Commissioning data also indicated greater noise in data when a satellite was in view of the sun; the current theory is this is caused by differential heating in the satellite, but this has not been confirmed. Overall, the constellation is in good health and, due to accurate orbital insertion, has significant fuel reserves remaining.

=== Results ===
In September 2016, scientists published a study that revealed a direct link between GPS blackouts of low-Earth-orbiting satellites and "thunderstorms" in the ionosphere. During the first two years of Swarm's operation their GPS connection was broken 166 times. The high-resolution observations from the satellite helped to link these outages to ionospheric thunderstorms at altitudes of 300–600 km in the Earth's atmosphere.

In December 2016, scientists announced that, by using data from the Swarm satellites, they had discovered a new feature in the Earth's outer core, a jet-stream of rapidly moving liquid iron moving at around 50 km per year.

In April 2017, Swarm's data was used to confirm that STEVE was a previously unrecognized atmospheric phenomenon.

In May 2020, Swarm revealed that Earth's magnetic field is gradually weakening in an area stretching from Africa to South America, which might cause technical disturbances in satellites orbiting Earth.

== See also ==
- ESA's Living Planet Programme
  - GOCE
  - SMOS
  - CryoSat and CryoSat-2
  - ADM-Aeolus
  - EarthCARE
  - BIOMASS
  - FLEX
- Magsat
- FrontierSat
- Ørsted (satellite)
- Cluster (mission)
- CHAMP (satellite)
