= Gosic =

Gosic or GOSIC can mean:

- Global Observing Systems Information Center
- Gošić, a hamlet in Croatia
- Dragan Gošić (born 1981), Serbian footballer
