= CHAMP (satellite) =

Geoscientific space mission

Challenging Minisatellite Payload
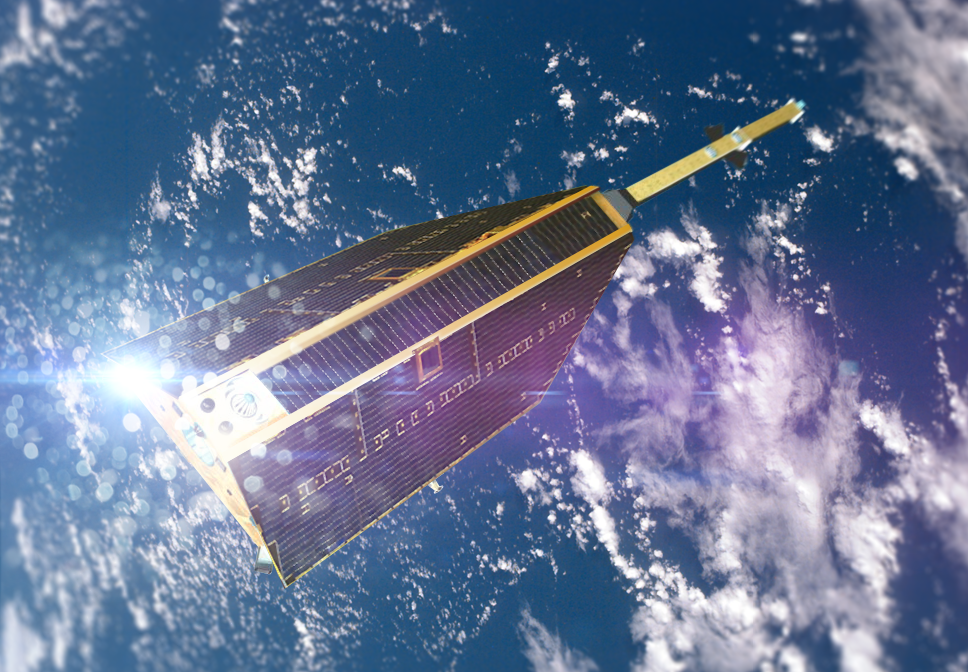
- Artist's impression of CHAMP
- Mission type: Technology
- Operator: DLR
- COSPAR ID: 2000-039B
- SATCAT no.: 26405
- Mission duration: Achieved: 10 years Planned: 5 years

Spacecraft properties
- Bus: Flexbus
- Manufacturer: Astrium
- Launch mass: 500 kilograms (1,100 lb)

Start of mission
- Launch date: 15 July 2000, 12:00:00 UTC
- Rocket: Kosmos-3M
- Launch site: Plesetsk Site 132/1

End of mission
- Decay date: 19 September 2010

Orbital parameters
- Reference system: Geocentric
- Regime: Low Earth
- Semi-major axis: 6,823.287 kilometres (4,239.794 mi)
- Eccentricity: 0.0007115
- Inclination: 87.18 degrees
- Period: 93.55 minutes
- RAAN: 124.21 degrees
- Argument of perigee: 277.62 degrees
- Epoch: 15 July 2000 12:00:00 UTC

Challenging Minisatellite Payload (CHAMP) was a German satellite launched July 15, 2000 from Plesetsk, Russia and was used for atmospheric and ionospheric research, as well as other geoscientific applications, such as GPS radio occultation, gravity field determination, and studying the Earth's magnetic field.

CHAMP was managed by GeoForschungsZentrum (GFZ) Potsdam.

The spacecraft is the first application of Astrium's "Flexbus" platform; GRACE was the second. A heavily modified version flew as the GOCE mission.

== Spacecraft instruments ==
An onboard BlackJack Global Positioning System (GPS) Flight Receiver, provided by JPL, enables the use of satellite to satellite tracking for vehicle positioning. To remove the effect of external, non-gravitational forces (e.g., atmospheric drag, solar radiation pressure) the satellite features an internal 3-axis STAR accelerometer. Independent verification of orbital position is enabled by a passive Laser Retro Reflector (LRR), which also enables calibration of the principal positioning via laser ranging. Spacecraft attitude is measured using Advanced Stellar Compass (ASC) star tracker supplied by Technical University of Denmark and attitude control is provided by three magnetorquers and cold gas thrusters.

Mounted on the boom, the satellite has an Magnetometer Instrument Assembly System (MIAS) for measurement of the Earth's magnetic field. The vehicle can measure the Earth's electric field parallel to the magnetic field with the Digital Ion Drift Meter (DIDM).

== End of mission ==
CHAMP completed its mission and re-entered the Earth's atmosphere on 19 September 2010 after 10 years (design life: five years).

The mission was judged as being successful by the involved scientists, in particular as the original 5 year design life was significantly extended.
