= CryoSat-1 =

ESA satellite to study polar ice; lost in launch failure in 2005

CryoSat
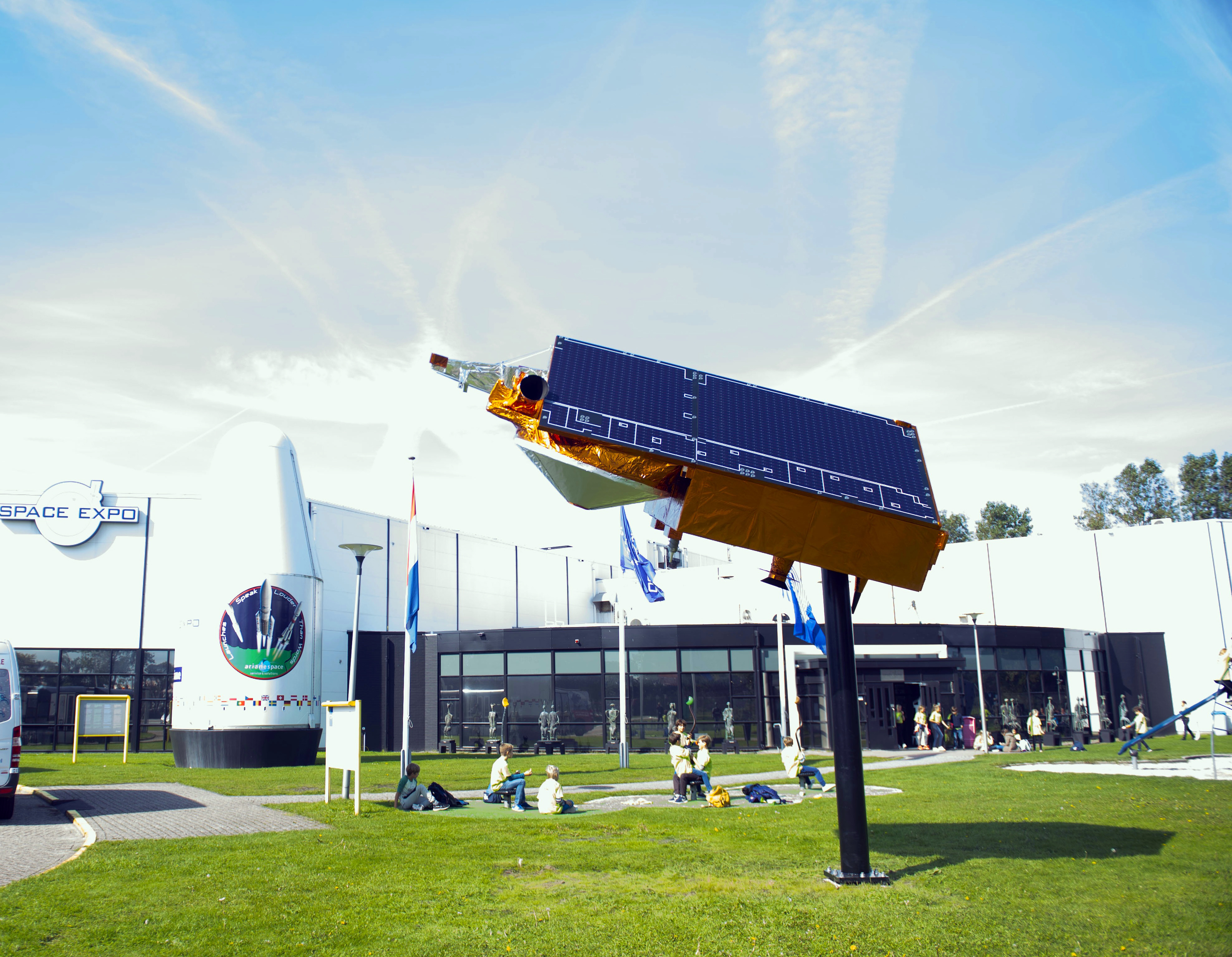
- Life-size model of CryoSat
- Mission type: Environmental
- Operator: ESA
- Website: ESA - CryoSat
- Mission duration: 3 years (planned); Failed to orbit

Spacecraft properties
- Manufacturer: EADS Astrium
- Launch mass: 750 kilograms (1,650 lb)

Start of mission
- Launch date: 8 October 2005, 15:02:00 UTC
- Rocket: Rokot/Briz-KM
- Launch site: Plesetsk 133/3
- Contractor: Eurockot

Orbital parameters
- Reference system: Geocentric
- Regime: Low Earth
- Epoch: Planned

CryoSat-1, also known as just CryoSat, was a European Space Agency satellite which was lost in a launch failure in 2005. The satellite was launched as part of the European Space Agency's CryoSat mission, which aims to monitor ice in the high latitudes. The second mission satellite, CryoSat-2, was successfully launched in April 2010.

== Background ==
The European Space Agency's CryoSat mission was developed following the success of previous satellite altimeters, including Envisat, ERS-1 and ERS-2. The primary aim of the mission is to allow scientists to measure sea ice thickness and monitor changes on the Greenland and Antarctic ice sheets using radar altimetry. The primary instrument on board the satellite was the Synthetic Aperture Interferometric Radar Altimeter (SIRAL), specifically designed to measure both sea ice and polar ice sheets. The method can allow detection of small changes in ice height and sea level, meaning scientists can measure both sea ice thickness and elevation change. A second instrument, DORIS, was to have been used to calculate precisely the spacecraft's orbit. It also carried an array of retroreflectors which would have allowed measurements to be made from the ground to verify the orbital data provided by DORIS.

The spacecraft was the first in the European Space Agency's Earth Explorer missions, and was intended to operate in low Earth orbit for three years at an unusually high inclination, therefore reaching the high latitudes. Construction began in 2001, with EADS Astrium being award the contract to build the satellite. Eurockot was to conduct the launch of the satellite using a Rokot/Briz-KM carrier rocket. The spacecraft cost €95 million and weighed 750 kilograms.

== Launch failure ==
In September 2005, CryoSat-1 arrived at the launch site in Plesetsk Cosmodrome, Russia. CryoSat-1 was launched at 15:02:00 UTC on 8 October 2005, however, the satellite failed to reach orbit. The European Space Agency reported that the first stage performed nominally, but the second stage main engine cut-off did not occur as expected. A missing command from the onboard flight control system resulted in the main engine continuing to operate until remaining fuel was depleted. Therefore, the separation of the second stage and upper stage did not happen, and the satellite could not reach orbit. CryoSat-1 fell into the drop zone north of Greenland near the North Pole. There were no safety concerns to populated areas.

Due to the importance of the CryoSat mission for monitoring Earth's polar regions, a recovery mission was announced less than five months after CryoSat's failure. CryoSat-2 was successfully launched in 2010.

== See also ==
- CryoSat
- CryoSat-2
- List of software bugs
