= EarthCARE =

European/Japanese Earth research satellite

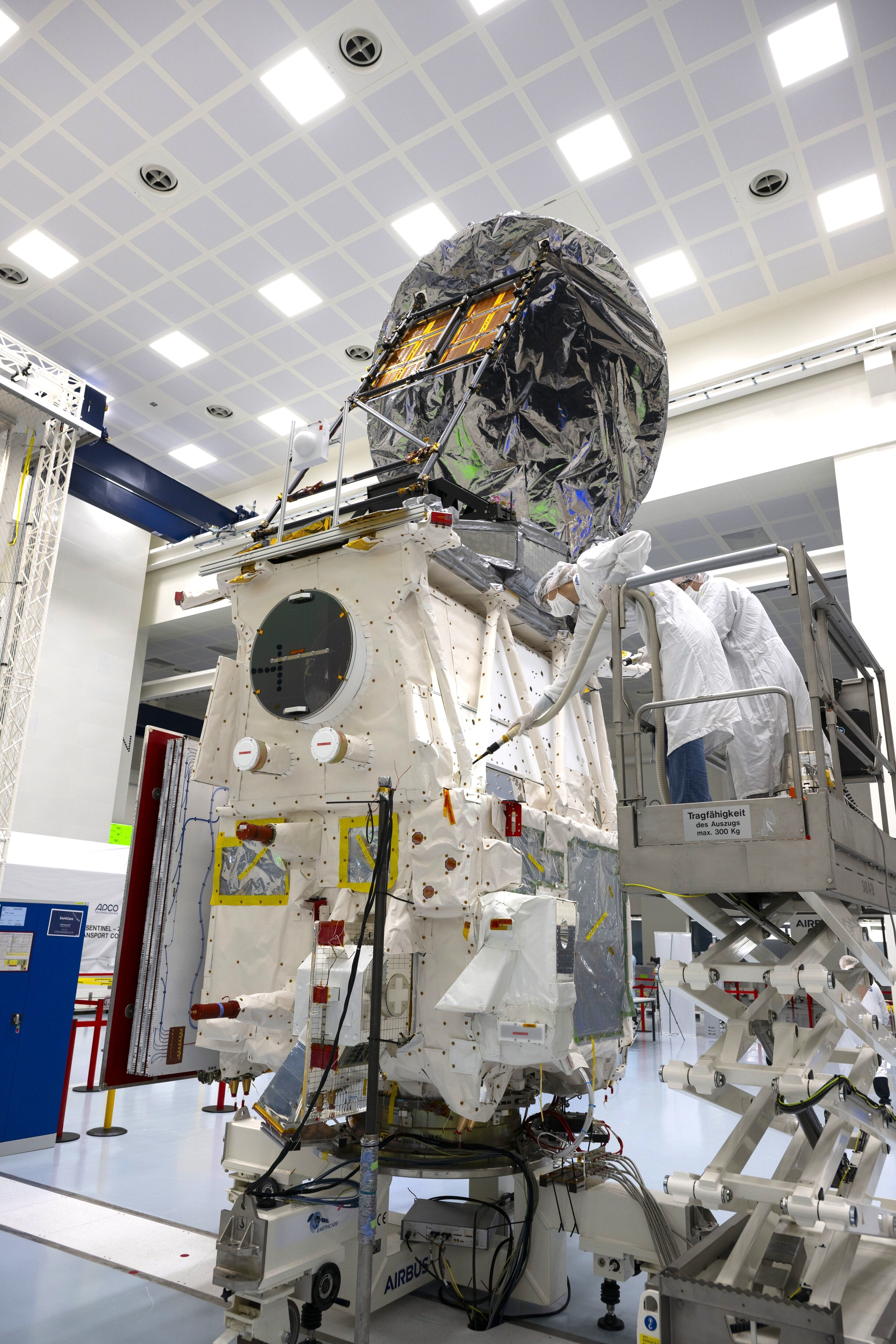
- EarthCARE being prepared for shipment to launch site
- Mission type: Earth observation
- Operator: ESA / JAXA / NICT
- COSPAR ID: 2024-101A
- SATCAT no.: 59908
- Website: EarthCare on esa.int
- Mission duration: 3 years (planned); 1 year, 11 months, 10 days (in progress)

Spacecraft properties
- Bus: AstroBus-L
- Manufacturer: EADS Astrium
- Launch mass: 2350 kg
- Dry mass: 2037 kg
- Dimensions: 2.5 x 19 m
- Power: 1700 W

Start of mission
- Launch date: 28 May 2024 22:20 UTC
- Rocket: Falcon 9 Block 5
- Launch site: Vandenberg SLC-4E
- Contractor: SpaceX

Orbital parameters
- Reference system: Geocentric
- Regime: Sun-synchronous
- Altitude: 393 km
- Inclination: 97,1°
- Period: 92,5 minutes
- Repeat interval: 25 days
- Epoch: Planned

Transponders
- Band: S Band (TT&C support); X band (science data acquisition)
- Bandwidth: 2 Mbit/s download (S Band); 150 Mbit/s download (X Band); 64 kbit/s upload (S Band)

Instruments
- ATLID: ATmospheric LIDar; CPR: Cloud Profiling Radar; MSI: Multi-Spectral Imager; BBR: Broad-Band Radiometer
- ESA insignia (2020s) FutureEO

EarthCARE (derived from Earth Cloud, Aerosol and Radiation Explorer), nicknamed Hakuryū (Japanese for "white dragon"), is a joint European/Japanese (ESA / JAXA / NICT) satellite, the sixth of ESA's Earth Explorer Programme. The main goal of the mission is the observation and characterization of clouds and aerosols as well as measuring the reflected solar radiation and the infrared radiation emitted from Earth's surface and atmosphere.

== Background ==
As the prime contractor, Astrium was responsible for the satellite's design, development and integration. Design and construction began in early 2009. As of January 2011, the total budget for the project was £500 million (€590 million/US$810 million). A significant proportion of the project was manufactured in the UK, the main structure of the spacecraft was built by RUAG Space in Switzerland and subsequently completed in Astrium's Stevenage facility, while one of the instruments was made in Sevenoaks by SSTL and another in Bristol, Somerset by SEA Group Ltd, now part of Thales Alenia Space UK.

== Mission ==
The aims of the mission are to improve understanding of the cloud, radiative and aerosol processes that affect the Earth's climate. The mission is providing a picture of the 3-dimensional spatial and the temporal structure of the radiative flux field at the top of the atmosphere, within the atmosphere and at the Earth's surface. The high-performance lidar and radar technology, plus the synergistic use of the different remote sensing techniques on board EarthCARE, is delivering datasets allowing scientists to study the relationship of clouds, aerosols, and radiation at accuracy levels that will significantly improve our understanding of these highly-variable parameters. The mission is providing this information to improve predictions about the weather and future climate.

== Science ==
The satellite is making measurements useful for a better understanding of the Earth's thermal and solar radiation balance. In particular, a combination of active (lidar and radar) and passive (radiometers and imagers) instruments enable EarthCARE to simultaneously measure the vertical and horizontal distribution of clouds and atmospheric aerosols along with top-of-atmosphere (TOA) long- and short-wave fluxes.

The spacecraft features four distinct instruments:

- ATmospheric LIDar (ATLID) - ESA / Airbus space Toulouse - 354.8 nm, high-spectral resolution and depolarisation (aerosols).
- Cloud Profiling Radar (CPR) - JAXA / NICT - 36 dBZ sensitivity, 500 m horizontal and 100 m vertical sampling resolution, Doppler capability (clouds). Operating at 94.05 GHz.
- Multi-Spectral Imager (MSI) - ESA - 7 channels, 150 km swath, 500 m pixel resolution (clouds and aerosols).
- Broad-Band Radiometer (BBR) - ESA - 2 channels, 3 views (nadir, fore and aft) (radiations).

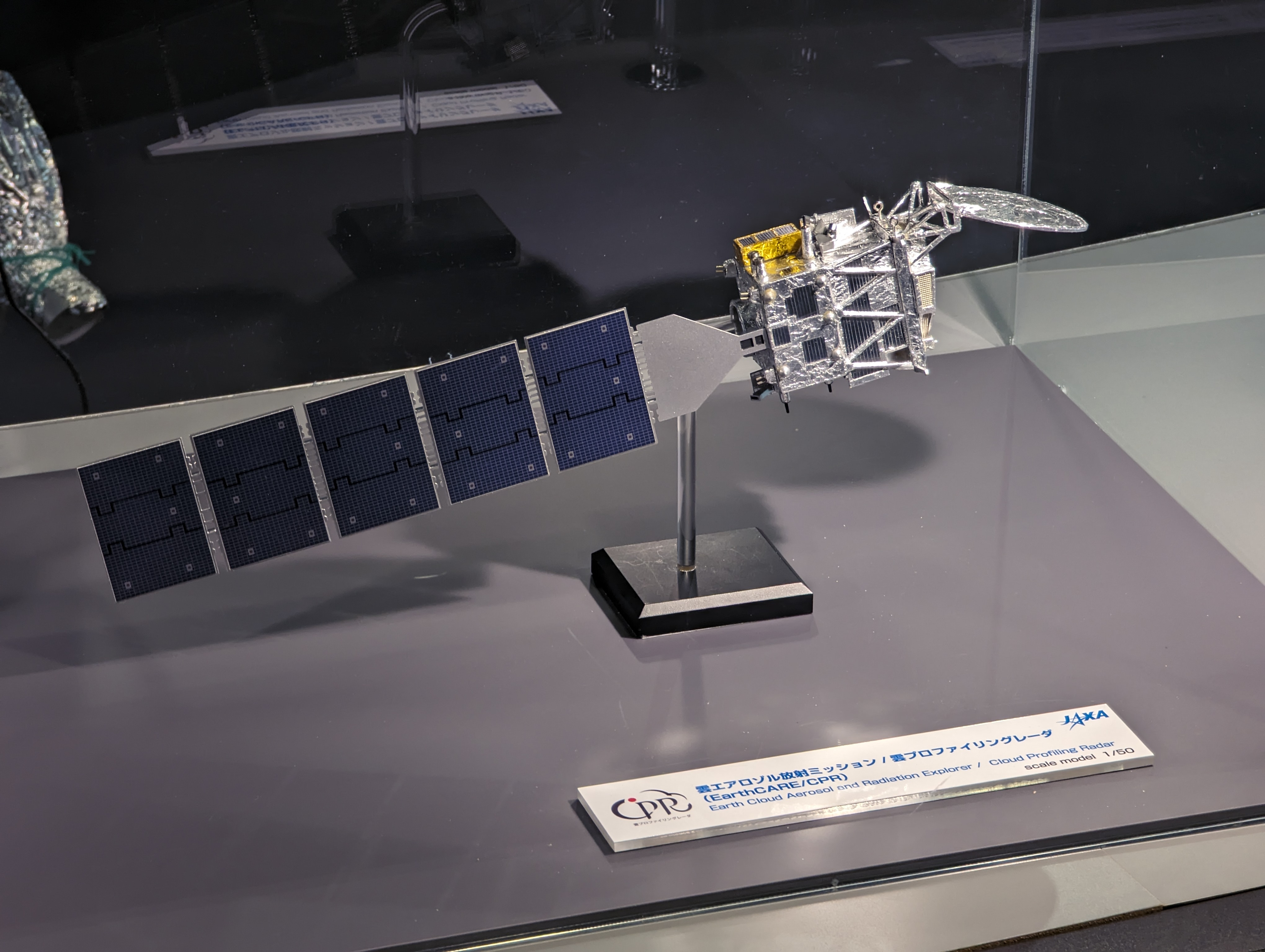
Scale model of the satellite

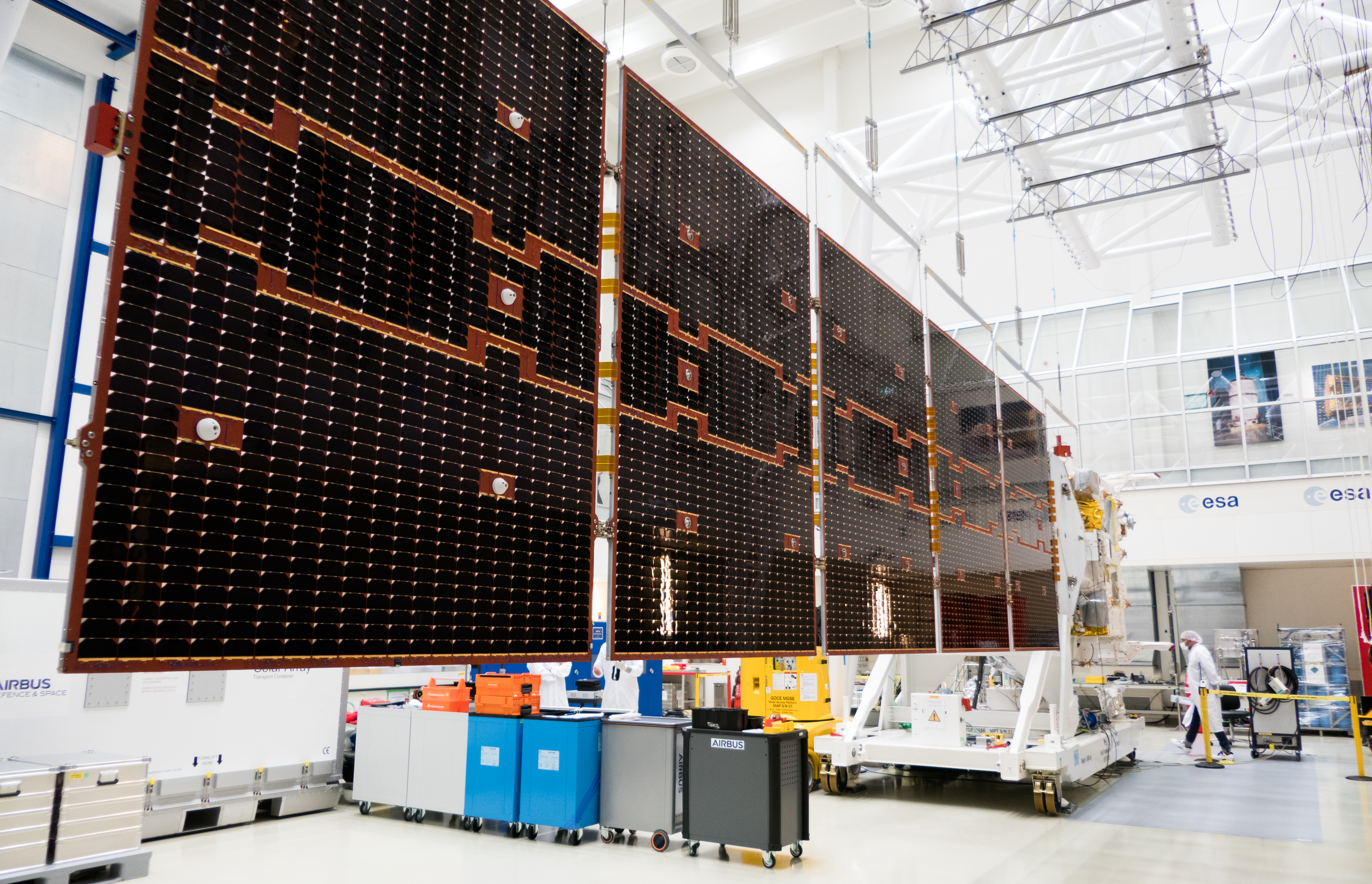
EarthCARE solar wing deployed during testing

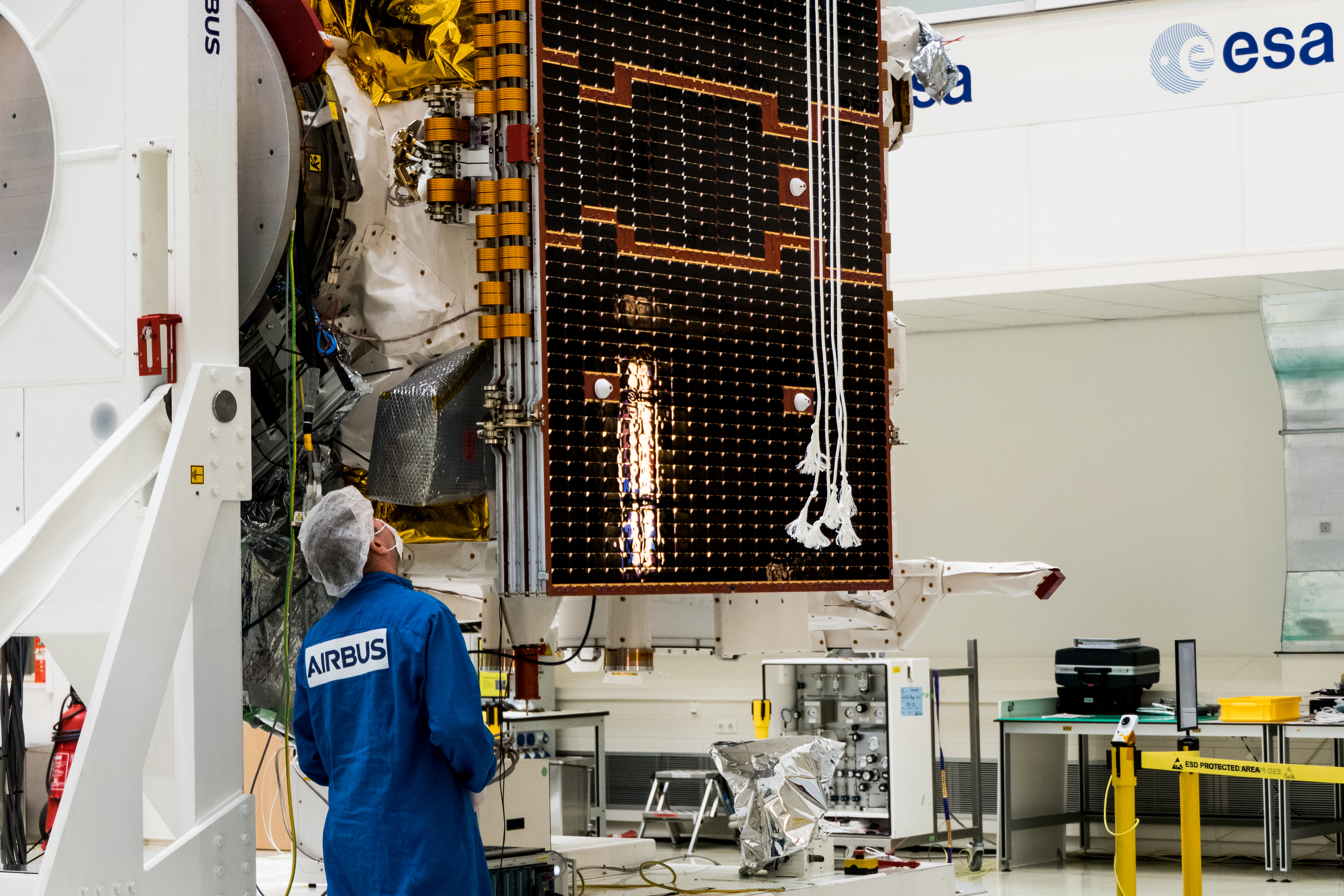
Inspecting satellite’s 11 metre solar wing in its folded configuration

== Timeline ==
=== Development ===
- In May 2008, ESA signed a contract worth €263 million (£220 million/US$360 million) with EADS subsidiary Astrium.
- In early 2009, design and construction began.
- In September 2014, ESA and JAXA held a joined EarthCARE International Science Workshop.
- From 2014 to 2015, integration of the instruments took place.
- In 2015, the launch was postponed to 2018 due to problems with lidar development.
- On May 29, 2024, at 00:20 CEST, EarthCARE was launched on a Falcon 9 rocket from the Vandenberg Space Force Base in California.

=== In orbit ===
- In 2024 and 2025, CNES was conducting aerial campaigns with stratospheric baloons and aircraft over Cape Verde and France, in order to validate EarthCARE’s observations with data collected closer to surface.
- On 13 January 2025, EarthCARE observed a rare band of type II polar stratospheric clouds stretching cca 3,000 km from Latvia to Greenland at heights of 20–30 km.
- In January 2025, the mission’s first level data stream has been made freely available by ESA after EarthCARE finished its commissioning phase at the end of 2024.
- In March 2025, EarthCARE’s Level-2 data products have been made fully available. These products contain the properties of the atmosphere estimated from the mission’s measurements.
- In April 2025, ECMWF published a detailed report of EarthCARE's early impacts on climate and weather prediction models. The satellite also demonstrated its ability to detect ocean phytoplankton, pointing towards a potential spin-off application for the ATLID instrument.

== See also ==
- List of Earth observation satellites
- List of European Space Agency programmes and missions
- ESA's Earth Explorers
  - GOCE
  - SMOS
  - CryoSat & CryoSat-2
  - Swarm
  - ADM-Aeolus
  - BIOMASS
  - FLEX
  - FORUM
  - Harmony
  - WIVERN
