= Microwave Imaging Radiometer with Aperture Synthesis =

Microwave Imaging Radiometer with Aperture Synthesis (MIRAS) is the major instrument on the Soil Moisture and Ocean Salinity satellite (SMOS). MIRAS employs a planar antenna composed of a central body (the so-called hub) and three telescoping, deployable arms, in total 69 receivers on the Unit. Each receiver is composed of one Lightweight Cost-Effective Front-end (LICEF) module, which detects radiation in the microwave L-band, both in horizontal and vertical polarizations. The aperture on the LICEF detectors, planar in arrangement on MIRAS, point directly toward the Earth's surface as the satellite orbits. The arrangement and orientation of MIRAS makes the instrument a 2-D interferometric radiometer that generates brightness temperature images, from which both geophysical variables are computed. The salinity measurement requires demanding performance of the instrument in terms of calibration and stability. The MIRAS instrument's prime contractor was EADS CASA Espacio, manufacturing the payload of SMOS under ESA's contract.

== LICEF ==
The LICEF detector is composed of a round patch antenna element, with 2 pairs of probes for orthogonal linear polarisations, feeding two receiver channels in a compact lightweight package behind the antenna. It picks up thermal radiation emitted by the Earth near 1.4 GHz in the microwave L-band, amplifies it 100 dB, and digitises it with 1-bit quantisation.
