= SKIM =

Sea surface KInematics Multiscale monitoring (SKIM)
- Mission type: Oceanography
- Operator: ESA
- Mission duration: Planned: 5–7 years

Start of mission
- Launch date: not scheduled
- Rocket: Vega C
- Launch site: Kourou ELV
- Contractor: Arianespace

Orbital parameters
- Reference system: Geocentric
- Regime: Low Earth
- Semi-major axis: 831 km (516 mi)
- Repeat interval: 29 days
Instruments
- SKaR: SKIM Ka-band Radar
- Global Positioning System Payload
- Laser Retroreflector

Sea surface kinematics multiscale monitoring (SKIM) was one of the two candidate missions for the 9th Earth Explorer mission of in the FutureEO programme of the European Space Agency (ESA). SKIM and the other candidate (FORUM) were pre-selected for a detailed study in November 2017. Only one of the two candidates was to be selected in 2019 for immediate implementation and a possible launch by the year 2025, and FORUM was chosen.

== Context ==
SKIM builds on the technological heritage of the SWIM instrument now flying on the China-France Ocean Satellite, with the important addition of Doppler measurement and changing from Ku to Ka-band. SKIM also inherits experience with Ka-band altimetry from the Indian-France SARAL-AltiKa mission.

== Scientific Objectives ==
The mission's science goals are to

- determine how the dynamics of the ocean total surface current velocity influence the integrated Earth system

more specifically,

- Determine the transport by waves and currents of material at the ocean surface including plankton, nutrients, heat, carbon, oil, and marine plastic debris
- Map and apply currents and its components to generate better estimates of atmosphere–ocean exchanges of heat, gas, momentum and energy accounting for the full interplay between the surface ocean and the lower atmosphere (including upper ocean mixing)
- The satellite will overfly Earth from 83°S to 83°N, covering at least 97 percent of the globe.
