= Soil Moisture and Ocean Salinity =

ESA earth observation satellite

SMOS
- Artist's illustration of SMOS with its solar panels extended and its MIRAS instrument deployed
- Mission type: Earth observation
- Operator: ESA
- COSPAR ID: 2009-059A
- SATCAT no.: 36036
- Website: www.esa.int/Our_Activities/Observing_the_Earth/SMOS
- Mission duration: Planned: 3 years Elapsed: 16 years, 10 months, 1 day

Spacecraft properties
- Bus: Proteus
- Manufacturer: Thales Alenia Space; CNES
- Launch mass: 658 kilograms (1,451 lb)
- Dry mass: 630 kilograms (1,390 lb)
- Dimensions: 2.4 by 2.3 metres (7.9 ft × 7.5 ft) (diameter)
- Power: up to 1065 watts

Start of mission
- Launch date: 2 November 2009, 14:21:00 UTC
- Rocket: Rokot/Briz-KM
- Launch site: Plesetsk 133/3
- Contractor: Eurockot

Orbital parameters
- Reference system: Geocentric
- Regime: Sun-synchronous
- Perigee altitude: 765 kilometres (475 mi)
- Apogee altitude: 766 kilometres (476 mi)
- Inclination: 98.44 degrees
- Period: 100.02 minutes
- Repeat interval: 23 days
- Epoch: 25 January 2015, 00:45:13 UTC

Transponders
- Band: S Band (TT&C support); X Band (science data acquisition)
- Bandwidth: up to 722 kbit/s download (S Band) up to 18.4 Mbit/s download (X Band) up to 4 kbit /s upload (S Band)

Instruments
- MIRAS: Microwave Imaging Radiometer using Aperture Synthesis
- ESA insignia (2020s) FutureEO

Soil Moisture and Ocean Salinity (SMOS) is a satellite which forms part of ESA's Living Planet Programme. It is intended to provide new insights into Earth's water cycle and climate. In addition, it is intended to provide improved weather forecasting and monitoring of snow and ice accumulation.

== History ==
The project was proposed in November 1998; in 2004 the project passed ESA-phase "C/D" and, after several delays, it was launched on 2 November 2009 from Plesetsk Cosmodrome on a Rockot rocket. The first data from the MIRAS (Microwave Imaging Radiometer using Aperture Synthesis) instrument was received on 20 November 2009. The SMOS programme cost is about €315 million ($465 million; £280 million). It is led by ESA but with significant input from French and Spanish interests.

The satellite is part of ESA's Earth Explorer programme – satellite missions that are performing innovative science in obtaining data on issues of pressing environmental concern. The first is already complete – a mission called GOCE, which mapped variations in the pull of gravity across the Earth's surface. SMOS was the second Explorer to launch; and was followed by CryoSat-2 (the first CryoSat failed on launch), Swarm (spacecraft), and ADM-Aeolus.

== Launcher ==
The satellite was launched on 2 November 2009 (04:50 (01:50 GMT)) to a nearly circular orbit of 763 km aboard a Rokot, a modified Russian Intercontinental Ballistic Missile (ICBM) SS-19 launched from a decommissioned SS-19 launcher from Northern Russia's Plesetsk Cosmodrome. The SMOS satellite was launched together with the Proba-2, a technology demonstration satellite.

== Science ==
The goal of the SMOS mission is to monitor surface soil moisture with an accuracy of 4% (at 35–50 km spatial resolution). This aspect is managed by the HYDROS project. Project Aquarius will attempt to monitor sea surface salinity with an accuracy of 0.1 psu (10- to 30-day average and a spatial resolution of 200 km x 200 km).

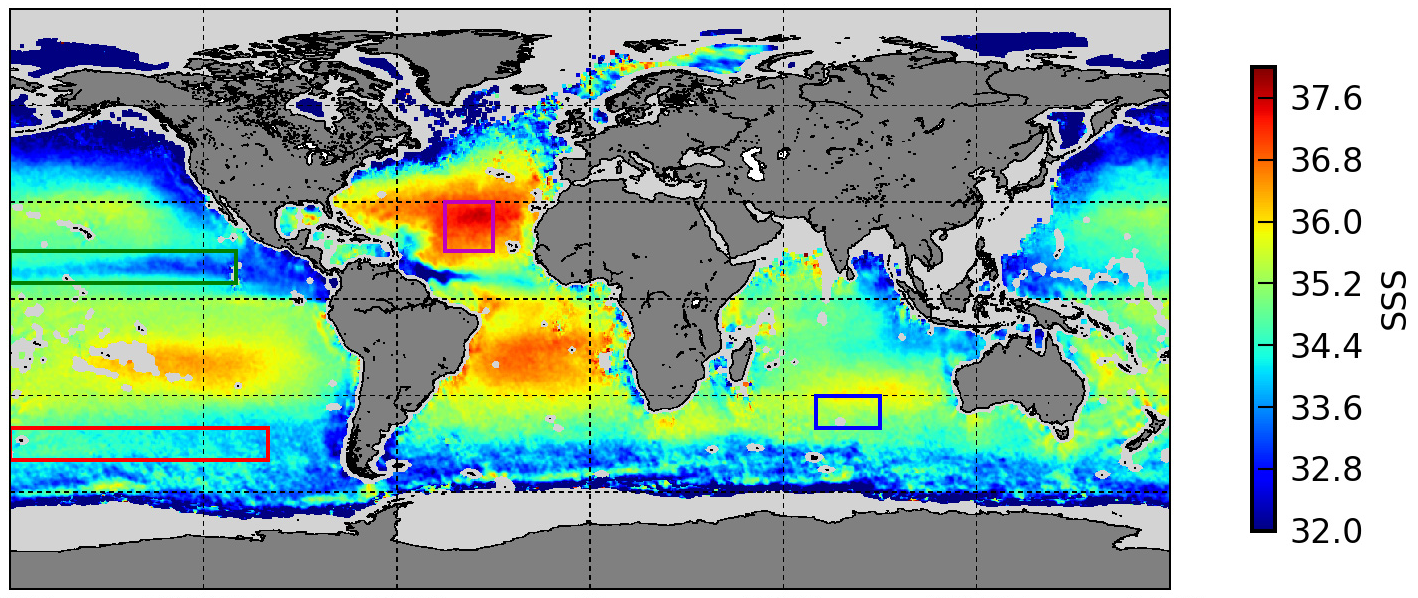
The first global map of oceanic surface salinity, produced by the SMOS satellite. The salinity varies from 32‰ (deep purple) to 38‰ (bright red).

Soil moisture is an important aspect of climate, and therefore forecasting. Plants transpire water from depths lower than 1 meter in many places and satellites like SMOS can only provide moisture content down to a few centimeters, but using repeated measurements in a day, the satellite can extrapolate soil moisture. The SMOS team of ESA hope to work with farmers around the world, including the United States Department of Agriculture to use as ground-based calibration for models determining soil moisture, as it may help to better understand crop yields over wide regions.

Ocean salinity is crucial to the understanding of the role of the ocean in climate through the global water cycle. Salinity in combination with temperature determines ocean circulation by defining its density and hence thermohaline circulation. Additionally, ocean salinity is one of the variables that regulate CO_{2} uptake and release and therefore has an effect on the oceanic carbon cycle.

Information from SMOS is expected to help improve short and medium-term weather forecasts, and also have practical applications in areas such as agriculture and water resource management. In addition, climate models should benefit from having a more precise picture of the scale and speed of movement of water in the different components of the hydrological cycle.

SMOS has been used to improve hurricane forecasting by collecting hurricane surface-level wind speed data using its novel microwave imaging radiometer, which can penetrate the thick clouds surrounding a cyclone. Hurricanes that have been studied by SMOS include Hurricane Florence, Typhoon Mangkhut, and Typhoon Jebi.

=== Instrumentation ===
The SMOS satellite carries a new type of instrument called Microwave Imaging Radiometer with Aperture Synthesis (MIRAS). Some eight metres across, it has the look of helicopter rotor blades; the instrument creates images of radiation emitted in the microwave L-band (1.4 GHz). MIRAS will measure changes in the wetness of the land and in the salinity of seawater by observing variations in the natural microwave emission coming up off the surface of the planet.

=== Operations and ground segment ===
The CNES Satellite Operations Ground Segment operates the spacecraft with telecommunications from ESA's S-band facility located in Kiruna, Sweden. The Data Processing Ground Segment is located in ESAC, Villafranca del Castillo, Spain. Higher level processing of information is done by scientists globally.

== See also ==
- ESA's Living Planet Programme
  - GOCE
  - CryoSat & CryoSat-2
  - Swarm
  - ADM-Aeolus
  - EarthCARE
  - BIOMASS
  - FLEX
- Aquarius payload (NASA)
- Soil Moisture Active Passive satellite
- Proba-2
