= EGS-CC =

The European Ground System - Common Core (EGS-CC) is a European initiative to develop a common infrastructure to support the development of ground space systems for space missions.

By defining a common infrastructure, EGS-CC is aiming at providing many benefits such as:

- Faster transition from the different mission phases (spacecraft assembly, integration and testing (AIT), and mission operations)
- Reduce cost and risk for space missions
- Support the evolution of ground segment systems towards new technologies
- Promote the upgrade of ancillary implementations

The initiative is being performed as collaboration between ESA, the European National Agencies and the European Industry. The European Space Agency established an agreement with European National space agencies (DLR, CNES, UKSA) as well as the large European system integrators such as Airbus, Thales Alenia Space and OHB Systems, for a collaboration to develop EGS-CC. Together they formed a Steering Board (SB) and a Systems Engineering Team (SET), overseeing the development.

== See also ==
- SCOS-2000 – The Satellite Control and Operation System 2000 (SCOS-2000) is a generic satellite Mission Control System that is currently used by many space missions.
