= Centre for Polar Observation & Modelling =

Research center in the UK

The Centre for Polar Observation & Modelling (CPOM) is a Natural Environment Research Council (NERC) Centre of Excellence that studies processes in the Earth's polar environments. CPOM conducts research on sea ice, land ice, and ice sheets using satellite observations and numerical models.

CPOM comprises research groups and scientists based at the Universities of Leeds, Bristol, Reading, Lancaster, Swansea, Edinburgh, and University College London. CPOM also has partnerships with several other institutions, including the British Antarctic Survey (BAS), the National Oceanography Centre (NOC), the National Centre for Earth Observation (NCEO), the European Space Agency, and the Met Office.

== History ==
The Centre for Polar Observation and Modelling was founded in 2000 by Professor Sir Duncan Wingham.

=== Directors ===
Sir Wingham was director of CPOM from 2000 to 2005, and his expertise in the study of Earth's ice sheets led to high impact publications on the widespread mass loss on the west Antarctic Ice Sheet. He was also Project Scientist of the European Space Agency's CryoSat mission. He has since been appointed as NERC Chief Executive. Professor Sir Wingham was awarded a knighthood in 2019 for services to Climate Science.

Sir Wingham was succeeded as CPOM Director by Professor Seymour Laxon. Professor Laxon was an expert on satellite radar altimetry, and his work pioneered the use of satellite altimetry to measure sea ice thickness and surface circulation in polar oceans. This work would lead to the successful development of the European Space Agency's CryoSat mission. Sadly, Professor Laxon died following an accident in 2013.

The role of CPOM Director was succeeded by Professor Andrew Shepherd. Professor Shepherd is an expert in remote observations of the Cryosphere, and is Principal Scientific Advisor to the European Space Agency's CryoSat mission, and co-leader of the Ice Sheet Mass Balance Inter-comparison Exercise.

== Research ==
Recent notable publications from CPOM scientists that garnered significant media attention include:

- In 2022, researchers from CPOM and BAS found that mega iceberg A68 had released 152 billion tonnes of freshwater into the ocean around South Georgia.
- In 2021, CPOM researchers named glaciers in the Getz region of Antarctica after international climate conferences, including COP26 in Glasgow.
- CPOM researchers reported in 2021 that Arctic sea ice is thinning twice as fast as previously thought.
- In 2021, a review by CPOM researchers into the state of Earth's ice showed that between 1994 and 2017, Earth lost 28 trillion tonnes of ice.
- Researchers from CPOM in 2020 found that ice sheets in Greenland and Antarctica are melting at a rate which matches the worst-case scenario for sea level rise.
- In 2020, researchers from CPOM found a six-fold increase in polar ice losses since the 1990s.
