= ADM-Aeolus =

Wind-measuring satellite

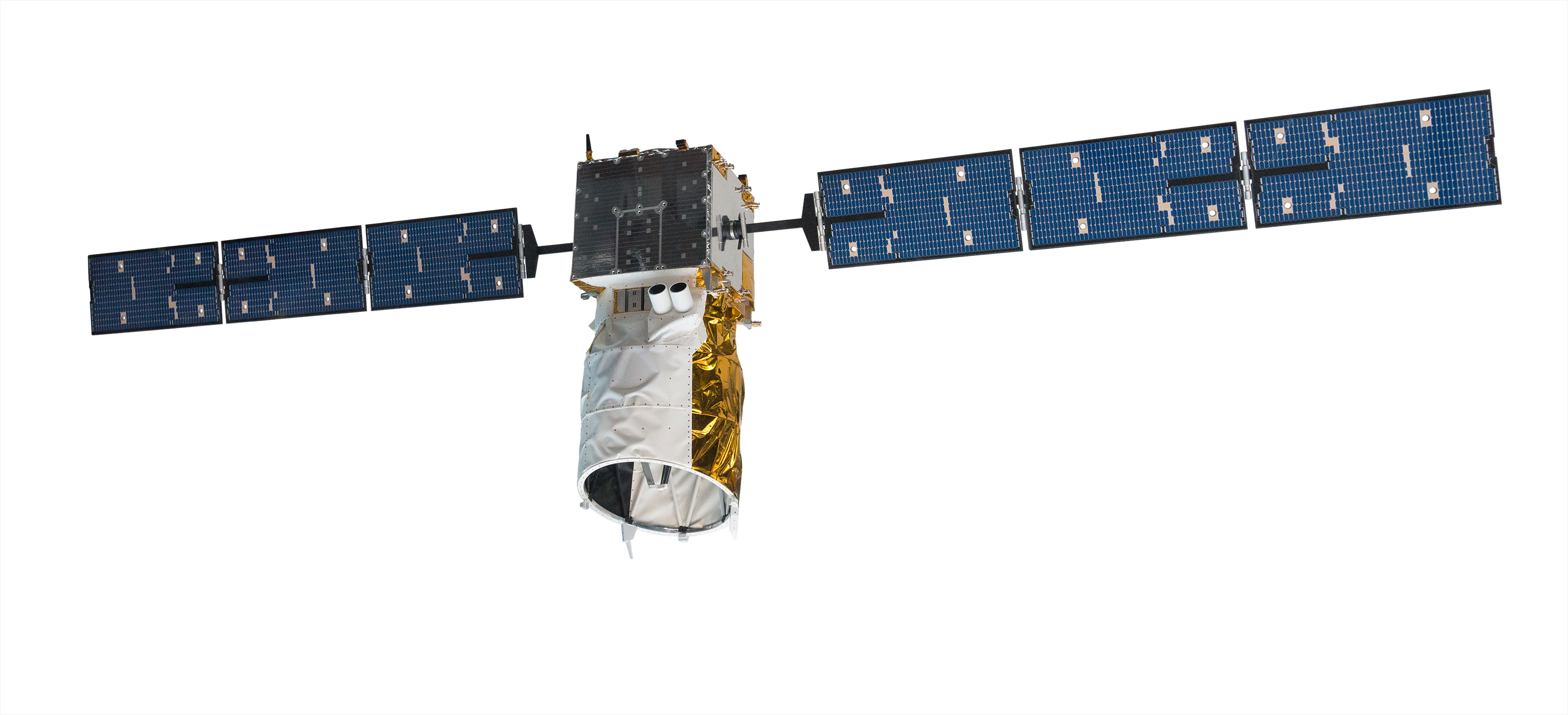
- Artist's view of ADM-Aeolus
- Names: Atmospheric Dynamics Mission-Aeolus
- Mission type: ESA Earth Explorer; Weather satellite
- Operator: ESA / ESOC
- COSPAR ID: 2018-066A
- SATCAT no.: 43600
- Mission duration: 5 years (achieved)

Spacecraft properties
- Manufacturer: Airbus Defence and Space
- Launch mass: 1,366 kg (3,012 lb)
- Dry mass: 1,200 kg (2,600 lb)
- Dimensions: 1.74 × 1.9 × 2 m (5 ft 9 in × 6 ft 3 in × 6 ft 7 in)
- Power: 2300 watts

Start of mission
- Launch date: 22 August 2018, 21:20 UTC
- Rocket: Vega
- Launch site: Centre Spatial Guyanais, ELV
- Contractor: Arianespace

End of mission
- Disposal: Deorbited
- Last contact: July 1, 2023
- Decay date: July 28, 2023

Orbital parameters
- Reference system: Geocentric orbit
- Regime: Sun-synchronous orbit
- Altitude: 320 km (200 mi)
- Inclination: 97.0°

Transponders
- Band: S-band (TT&C support); X-band (science data acquisition)
- Bandwidth: 8 kbit/s download (S-band); 10 Mbit/s download (X-band); 2 kbit/s upload (S-band)

Instruments
- Atmospheric Laser Doppler Instrument (ALADIN)
- ESA insingia FutureEO

Aeolus, or, in full, Atmospheric Dynamics Mission-Aeolus (ADM-Aeolus), was an Earth observation satellite operated by the European Space Agency (ESA). It was built by Airbus Defence and Space, launched on 22 August 2018, and operated until it was deorbited and re-entered the atmosphere over Antarctica on 28 July 2023. ADM-Aeolus was the first satellite with equipment capable of performing global wind-component-profile observation and provided much-needed information to improve weather forecasting. Aeolus was the first satellite capable of observing what the winds are doing on Earth, from the surface of the planet and into the stratosphere 30 km high.

The satellite was named after Aeolus, a god from the Greek mythology, the ruler of the winds.

== Program ==
The program was initially approved in 1999 for a 2007 launch but technological obstacles caused 11 years of delay, as it was launched on 22 August 2018. For an estimated €481 million (US$568 million) program cost, it was planned to provide 64,000 daily profiles from March or April 2019. Its altitude was a low 320 km (200 mi) for enough backscattered light sensibility, inducing a short 3 years life expectancy.

== Mission ==
Aeolus was the fifth planned satellite in the Living Planet Programme (LPP) of the European Space Agency. The main goal of this mission was to further develop the knowledge of Earth's atmosphere and weather systems. By recording and monitoring the weather in different parts of the world, Aeolus allowed scientists to build complex weather models, which could then be used to help predict how that environment will behave in the future. These predictions were useful in the short-term, since they could be applied to numerical weather prediction in order to make forecasts more accurate. The mission thus improved the knowledge of all sorts of weather phenomena, from global warming to the effects of air pollution. Aeolus was seen as a mission that paved the way for future operational meteorological satellites dedicated to study Earth's wind profiles.

== Satellite ==
The spacecraft was built by Airbus Defence and Space. In 2014, the integration of ALADIN instrument was completed and vacuum along with vibration testing begun. On 7 September 2016, ESA and Arianespace signed a contract to secure the launch of the Aeolus satellite.

== Scientific payload ==
The wind-component profiles was measured by the Atmospheric LAser Doppler INstrument (ALADIN).

=== ALADIN ===
The ALADIN instrument (Atmospheric Laser Doppler Instrument) was a direct detection ultraviolet laser lidar consisting of three major elements: a transmitter, a combined Mie and Rayleigh backscattering receiver assembly, and a Cassegrain telescope with a 1.5 m (4 ft 11 in) diameter. The transmitter architecture was based on a 60 mJ pulsed diode-pumped Nd:YAG laser, frequency-tripled to provide 60 millijoules pulses of ultraviolet light at 355 nm. This frequency was chosen because of the increased Rayleigh scattering in the ultraviolet region of the spectrum, and because it was eye-safe at distances greater than several hundred metres. The Mie receiver consisted of a Fizeau interferometer with a resolution of 100 MHz (equivalent to 18 m/s). The received backscatter signal produces a linear fringe whose position was directly linked to the wind velocity; the wind speed was determined by the fringe centroid position to better than a tenth of the resolution (1.8 m/s). The Rayleigh receiver employed a dual-filter Fabry–Pérot interferometer with a 2 GHz resolution and 5 GHz spacing. It analyzed the wings of the Rayleigh spectrum with a CCD; the etalon was split into two zones, which are imaged separately on the detector. The lidar was aimed 35° from nadir and 90° to the satellite track (on the side away from the Sun).

The processing of the backscatter signals produced line-of-sight wind-component profiles above thick clouds or down to the surface in clear air along the satellite track, every 200 km (120 mi). Wind information in thin cloud or at the tops of thick clouds was also attainable; from the data processing, information on other elements like clouds and aerosols could also be extracted. The data was disseminated to the main numerical weather prediction centres in near-real time.

Development of the ALADIN instrument had been problematic. The ultraviolet laser was causing damage to the optical surfaces in a vacuum. ESA scientists asked NASA for support; however, NASA had minimal experience with lidar of this design. Technology required for the satellite was pushing the technology envelope; therefore, after problematic development, ESA asked Airbus to perform additional full-model tests in a vacuum before continuing mission development. Overall complications involved in the instrument caused an estimated 50% final cost overrun, so ESA had to come up with additional funding for the project.

== Launch ==
Aeolus was designed to be compatible with many small-capacity launch vehicles such as Vega, Rokot or Dnepr. In November 2013, ESA scheduled the launch on a VEGA in one of the five flights of the VERTA Programme, but in 2015 launch was postponed to August 2018 due to problems with their lidar development. A €32.57 million launch contract with Arianespace was signed on 7 September 2016. The launch finally took place on 22 August 2018 on a Vega launch vehicle from French Guiana at 18:20 local time.

== Operations ==
The satellite was launched on 22 August 2018. Three months of testing was conducted before including data in weather models. One year of usage had resulted in reduced power from the primary laser. After switching to the second laser, the instrument was meeting mission objectives.

In mid-2019, ESA determined that the UV laser was losing power: it started with pulses of 65 millijoules once it reached orbit, but that energy declined 20 to 30% in the first nine months, and was losing one millijoule per week in May 2019. ESA then decided to switch to a backup laser that had not been used, offering the opportunity to complete the expected 3 year life of the satellite. The report also said that the satellite's orbit at 320 km required re-boosting every week, limiting the satellite's life to the available propellant.

The satellite was supported by the Europe-wide collaboration Aeolus DISC (Data, Innovation, and Science Cluster) which aims to improve the quality of the data. Aeolus DISC did fly thousands of kilometers from Greenland to Cape Verde to calibrate and validate the data taken by Aeolus. Aeolus was also supported by the international collaboration JATAC (Joint Aeolus Tropical Atlantic Campaign), which took measurements with ground-based remote sensing instruments, especially lidars, drones and radiosondes attached to weather balloons. These measurements were used to calibrate and validate the measurements by Aeolus.

On 30 April 2023, all nominal operations were concluded in preparation for a series of end-of-life activities. A controlled reentry into the atmosphere was planned. ESOC conducted an 'assisted re-entry', using a mixture of natural air drag and commanded delta-v. Aeolus re-entered the atmosphere over Antarctica on 28 July 2023.

== Impact ==
In 2020 it was reported that measurements from Aeolus enabled ECMWF to partly compensate for reduced measurements from commercial aircraft at the start of the COVID-19 outbreak.

In September 2021, since it was launched three years ago, Aeolus had far exceeded expectations and frequently hailed a remarkable success. It was developed as a research mission and to demonstrate how novel laser technology could deliver vertical profiles of Earth's wind. These measurements were much needed, for example by the World Meteorological Organization's Global Observing System, which is a coordinated system of methods and facilities for making meteorological and environmental observations on a global scale.

Aeolus improved short-range forecasts, particularly in the tropics and at mid-latitudes. It might even improve hurricane forecasts, especially in the Pacific and Indian Oceans, where reconnaissance aircraft data are unavailable.

Since ECMWF started assimilating Aeolus data in 2020 the satellite became one of the highest impact-per-observation instruments in existence. Aeolus created an economic benefit of €3.5 billion for Europe. Aeolus Mission Manager, Tommaso Parrinello, called Aeolus "one of the most successful missions ever flown by ESA". A follow-up mission, called Aeolus-2, will be launched within a decade after the mission end.

== See also ==
- List of European Space Agency programmes and missions
- BIOMASS
- CryoSat and CryoSat-2
- EarthCARE
- FLEX
- Gravity Field and Steady-State Ocean Circulation Explorer (GOCE)
- Soil Moisture and Ocean Salinity (SMOS)
- Swarm
