= Mann Eddy =

Persistent clockwise circulation in the middle of the North Atlantic ocean

The Mann Eddy is a very small feature of ocean currents in the Atlantic. It is a persistent clockwise circulation in the middle of the North Atlantic ocean, specifically "a mesoscale anticyclone, adjacent to the path of the North Atlantic Current (NAC) in the Newfoundland basin". The eddy has persisted since its initial discovery in 1967.

The peak in the Eddy Kinetic Energy (EKE) associated with the Mann Eddy lies at around 43°N 43°W, within the North Atlantic Current travelling to the North along the Grand Banks.

The oceanographer Dr Rory Bingham from Newcastle University (UK) describes it as "a persistent pocket of water in the Atlantic that just goes around and around."
