= Global Observing Systems Information Center =

Global Observing Systems Information Center (GOSIC) is a programme for observations, modelling, and analysis of terrestrial ecosystems to support sustainable development. It is based in Rome, Italy - and is supported by NOAA, NCDC, and the US GCOS Program.

It is also a co-ordinator of GOOS and GTOS
