= CryoSat =

ESA programme monitoring polar ice using satellites

CryoSat is an ESA programme to monitor variations in the extent and thickness of polar ice through use of a satellite in low Earth orbit. The information provided about the behaviour of coastal glaciers that drain thinning ice sheets will be key to better predictions of future sea level rise. The CryoSat-1 spacecraft was lost in a launch failure in 2005, however the programme was resumed with the successful launch of a replacement, CryoSat-2, launched on 8 April 2010.

CryoSat is operated from the European Space Operations Centre (ESOC) in Darmstadt, Germany.

== Description ==
CryoSat's primary instrument is SIRAL (SAR / Interferometric Radar Altimeter). SIRAL operates in one of three modes, depending on where (above the Earth's surface) CryoSat was flying. Over the oceans and ice sheet interiors, CryoSat operates like a traditional radar altimeter. Over sea ice, coherently transmitted echoes are combined (synthetic aperture processing) to reduce the surface footprint so that CryoSat could map smaller ice floes. CryoSat's most advanced mode is used around the ice sheet margins and over mountain glaciers. Here, the altimeter performs synthetic aperture processing and uses a second antenna as an interferometer to determine the across-track angle to the earliest radar return. This provides the exact surface location being measured when the surface is sloping.

The original CryoSat was proposed in 1998 by Duncan Wingham of University College London. The satellite's planned three-year mission was to survey natural and human driven changes in the cryosphere on Earth. It was designed to provide much more accurate data on the rate of change of the surface elevation of the polar ice sheets and sea ice thickness. It was the first ESA Earth Sciences satellite selected through open, scientific competition. It was destroyed on launch October 8, 2005. The existing satellite is therefore, formally speaking, CryoSat-2, but the mission is still known simply as CryoSat.

Although largely the same as the original satellite a number of key improvements were included in CryoSat-2. The most significant was the decision to provide a fully duplicated payload to enable the mission to continue if a fault caused the loss of the SIRAL radar, but there were many other changes "under the hood". Some of these were caused by obsolescence in the original design, some improved reliability and others made the satellite easier to operate. Despite all the changes the mission remains the same and the performance, in terms of measurement capability and accuracy, remains the same. As of 14 January 2010, the launch was scheduled for February 25, 2010 with a Dnepr rocket from the Baikonur Cosmodrome, but this was delayed. The CryoSat 2 launched on April 8, 2010, at 13:57 UTC.

For positioning purposes, CryoSat included a DORIS receiver, a laser retroreflector and three star trackers.

The ERS-1 and ERS-2 satellites were precursors that tested the techniques used by CryoSat.

== Satellites ==
CryoSat-1 was launched from the Plesetsk Cosmodrome in Russia on October 8, 2005, using a Rockot launcher. (Rockot is a modified SS-19 rocket which was originally an ICBM designed to deliver nuclear weapons, but which Russia is now eliminating in accordance with the START treaties.) According to Yuri Bakhvalov, First Deputy Director General of the Khrunichev Space Centre, when the automatic command to switch off the second stage engine did not take effect, the second stage continued to operate until it ran out of fuel and as a consequence the planned separation of the third (Briz-KM) stage of the rocket which carried the CryoSat satellite did not take place, and would thus have remained attached to the second stage. The upper rocket stages, together with the satellite, probably crashed in the Lincoln Sea. Analysis of the error revealed that it was caused by faults in the programming of the rocket, which had not been detected in simulations.

After the launch failure of CryoSat, ESA immediately started to plan a replacement CryoSat mission. This included securing the industrial team which had built the original, ordering parts which have a long delivery time and establishing a funding scheme within existing budgets. Due to the importance of the scientific goals of this satellite, there was enormous support for this, and the initial phases for CryoSat-2 were approved when ESA's Earth Observation Programme Board agreed to build a copy of the spacecraft on February 23, 2006.

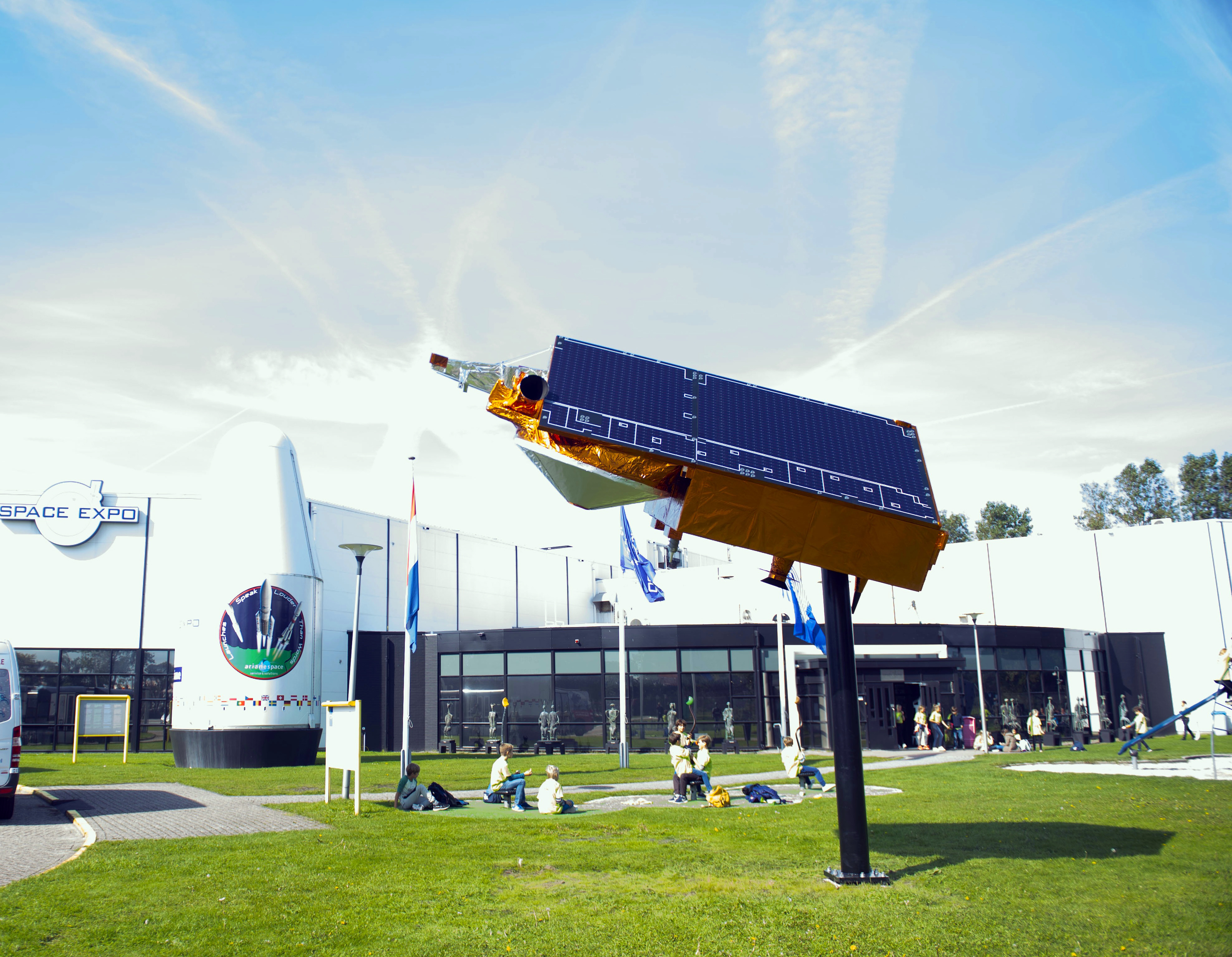
Life-size model of CryoSat

== See also ==
- ESA's Living Planet Programme
  - GOCE
  - CryoSat-2
  - Swarm
  - ADM-Aeolus
  - EarthCARE
  - BIOMASS
  - FLEX
- Gravity Recovery and Climate Experiment (GRACE) NASA - launch 2002
- Ice, Cloud, and land Elevation Satellite (ICESat) NASA - launch 2003
