= Duncan Wingham =

British physicist (born 1957)

Sir Duncan John Wingham (born 12 October 1957) is a British physicist who is professor of climate physics at University College London, and was the first director of the Centre for Polar Observation & Modelling. He was chief executive (January 2012 - January 2018) and Executive Chair (January 2018 - June 2023) of the Natural Environment Research Council and principal scientist for the CryoSat Satellite Mission.

In the 1990s, Wingham was involved in a four-year satellite study of the Antarctic ice sheet. His conclusion then, and from later research, is that the Antarctic has contributed little to observed rising sea levels in the 20th century. However, he has also stated that "it is possible that the consequences of global warming on sea level rise have been underestimated... Other sources of rise must be underestimated. In particular it is possible that the effect of global warming on thermal expansion [on the oceans] is larger than we thought".

In a 2005 interview Wingham stated "[t]he Antarctic is to some extent insulated from global warming because to its north are zonal flows in the atmosphere and ocean, unimpeded by other landmasses... I am not denying global warming."

Wingham was knighted in the 2020 New Year Honours for services to climate science.
