= Eurockot Launch Services =

- Company type: GmbH
- Industry: spacecraft launch provider
- Founded: 1995
- Headquarters: Bremen, Germany
- Area served: World
- Key people: Peter Freeborn (CEO)
- Parent: ArianeGroup, Khrunichev
- Website: www.eurockot.com

Eurockot Launch Services GmbH is a commercial spacecraft launch provider and was founded in 1995. Eurockot uses an expendable launch vehicle called the Rockot to place satellites into low Earth orbit (LEO). Eurockot is jointly owned by ArianeGroup, which holds 51 percent, and by Khrunichev State Research and Production Space Center, which holds 49 percent. From 2000 through 2022, Eurockot launched from dedicated launch facilities at the Plesetsk Cosmodrome in northern Russia. Following the 2022 Russian invasion of Ukraine, international economic sanctions have placed the arrangement on hiatus.

Eurockot performed its first commercial launch in May 2000.
