= GOCE =

ESA satellite to map Earth's gravity field

Gravity Field and Steady-State Ocean Circulation Explorer
- Artist's view of GOCE. Its sleek, aerodynamic design led it to be dubbed the 'Ferrari of space'
- Mission type: Gravitational research
- Operator: ESA
- COSPAR ID: 2009-013A
- SATCAT no.: 34602
- Website: http://www.esa.int/GOCE
- Mission duration: Planned: 20 months Final: 4 years, 7 months, 3 days

Spacecraft properties
- Manufacturer: Thales Alenia Space; EADS Astrium
- Launch mass: 1,077 kg (2,374 lb)
- Dry mass: 872 kg (1,922 lb)
- Dimensions: 5.3 m × 2.3 m (17.4 ft × 7.5 ft)
- Power: 1,600 watts

Start of mission
- Launch date: 17 March 2009, 14:21 UTC
- Rocket: Rockot/Briz-KM
- Launch site: Plesetsk Cosmodrome
- Contractor: Eurockot Launch Services

End of mission
- Disposal: Orbital decay
- Declared: 21 October 2013 UTC
- Last contact: 10 November 2013, 22:42 UTC
- Decay date: 11 November 2013, 00:16 UTC

Orbital parameters
- Reference system: Geocentric
- Regime: Sun-synchronous
- Perigee altitude: 254.9 km (158.4 mi)
- Apogee altitude: 254.9 km (158.4 mi)
- Inclination: 96.7 degrees
- Epoch: 28 June 2010

Transponders
- Band: S band
- Frequency: 2 GHz
- Bandwidth: up to 1.2 Mbit/s download up to 4 kbit/s upload
Instruments
- EGG: Electrostatic Gravity Gradiometer
- SSTI: Satellite-to-Satellite Tracking Instrument
- LRR: Laser Retroreflector
- ESA insignia (2010s) FutureEO

The Gravity Field and Steady-State Ocean Circulation Explorer (GOCE) was the first of ESA's Living Planet Programme heavy satellites intended to map in unprecedented detail the Earth's gravity field. The spacecraft's primary instrumentation was a highly sensitive gravity gradiometer consisting of three pairs of accelerometers which measured gravitational gradients along three orthogonal axes.

Launched on 17 March 2009, GOCE mapped the deep structure of the Earth's mantle and probed hazardous volcanic regions. It brought new insight into ocean behaviour; this in particular, was a major driver for the mission. By combining the gravity data with information about sea surface height gathered by other satellite altimeters, scientists were able to track the direction and speed of geostrophic ocean currents. The low orbit and high accuracy of the system greatly improved the known accuracy and spatial resolution of the geoid (the theoretical surface of equal gravitational potential on the Earth).

The satellite's unique arrow shape and fins helped keep GOCE stable as it flew through the thermosphere at a comparatively low altitude of 255 kilometres (158 mi). Additionally, an ion propulsion system continuously compensated for the variable deceleration due to air drag without the vibration of a conventional chemically powered rocket engine, thus limiting the errors in gravity gradient measurements caused by non-gravitational forces and restoring the path of the craft as closely as possible to a purely inertial trajectory.

After running out of propellant, the satellite began dropping out of orbit and made an uncontrolled re-entry on 11 November 2013.

== Discoveries and applications ==
=== Mission objectives ===
- To determine gravity-field anomalies with an accuracy of 10^{−5} m/s^{2} (1 mGal). To increase resolution, the satellite flew in an unusually low orbit.
- To determine the geoid with an accuracy of 1–2 cm.
- To achieve the above at a spatial resolution better than 100 km.

=== Gravity map and model ===
The final gravity map and model of the geoid will provide users worldwide with well-defined data product that will lead to:

- A better understanding of the physics of the Earth's interior to gain new insights into the geodynamics associated with the lithosphere, mantle composition and rheology, uplift and subduction processes.
- A better understanding of the ocean currents and heat transport.
- A global height-reference system, which can serve as a reference surface for the study of topographic processes and sea-level change.
- Better estimates of the thickness of polar ice-sheets and their movement.

=== Findings ===
The first Earth global gravity model based on GOCE data was presented at ESA's Living Planet Symposium, in June 2010.

Initial results of the GOCE satellite mission were presented at the American Geophysical Union (AGU) 2010 Fall (Autumn) Meeting by Dr Rory Bingham from Newcastle University, UK. The maps produced from the GOCE data show ocean currents in much finer detail than had been available previously. Even very small details like the Mann Eddy in the North Atlantic were visible in the data, as was the effect of Hurricane Igor in 2010. Detailed analysis of GOCE's thruster and accelerometer data serendipitously revealed that it had detected the infrasound waves generated by the 2011 Tōhoku earthquake (whereupon it inadvertently became the first seismograph in orbit).

Later results from the GOCE data exposed details in the Earth's mantle including mantle plumes, ancient subduction zones, and remnants of the Tethys Ocean.

Subsequent analysis of GOCE data has also provided new information about the geological makeup of the Antarctic continent, including the detection of ancient continent remnants and at least three cratons beneath the Antarctic ice.

== Operations ==
=== Launch ===
The first launch attempt on 16 March 2009 was aborted due to a malfunction with the launch tower.

GOCE was launched on 17 March 2009 at 14:21 UTC from the Plesetsk Cosmodrome in northern Russia aboard a Rokot/Briz-KM vehicle. The Rokot is a modified UR-100N intercontinental ballistic missile that was decommissioned after the Strategic Arms Reduction Treaty. The launcher used the two lower liquid fuel stages of the original missile and was equipped with a Briz-KM third stage developed for precise orbit injection. GOCE was launched into a Sun-synchronous dusk-dawn orbit with an inclination of 96.7° and an ascending node at 18:00. Separation from the launcher was at 295 km. The satellite's orbit then decayed over a period of 45 days to an operational altitude, planned at 270 km. During this time, the spacecraft was commissioned and the electrical propulsion system checked for reliability in attitude control.

=== Operation ===
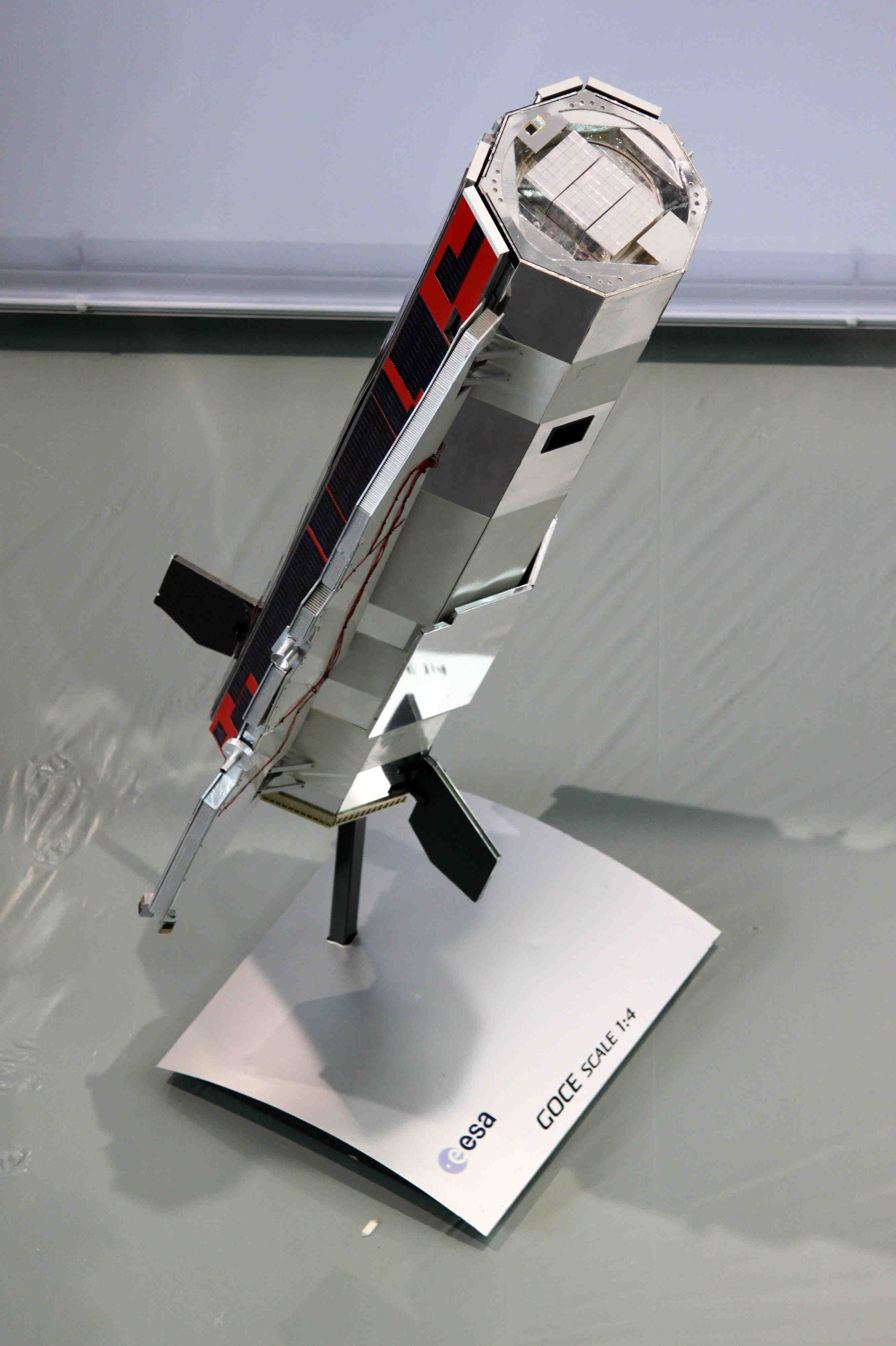
Model of GOCE

In February 2010 a fault was discovered in the satellite's computer, which meant controllers were forced to switch control to the backup computer.

In July 2010, GOCE suffered a serious communications malfunction, when the satellite suddenly failed to downlink scientific data to its receiving stations. Extensive investigations by experts from ESA and industry revealed that the issue was almost certainly related to a communication link between the processor module and the telemetry modules of the main computer. The recovery was completed in September 2010: as part of the action plan, the temperature of the floor hosting the computers was raised by some 7 °C (13 °F), resulting in restoration of normal communications.

In November 2010, the due completion date for the original 20-month mission before it was delayed by the glitches, it was decided to extend the mission lifetime until the end of 2012 in order to complete the original work and carry out a further 18-month mission to improve the collected data.

In November 2012 the orbit was lowered from 255 to 235 km (158 to 146 mi) to get higher resolution data, at which time fuel remained for another 50 weeks.

=== End of mission and re-entry ===
In May 2013 a further lowering to 229 km (142 mi) took place.

The satellite ran out of its xenon propellant in October 2013, at which time it would take 2–3 weeks to re-enter. On 18 October 2013, ESA reported that the pressure in the fuel system of GOCE's ion engine had dropped below 2.5 bar, which is the nominal operating pressure required to fire the engine. Subsequently, end of mission was formally declared on 21 October when the spacecraft ran out of fuel; deprived of xenon, the ion drive stopped working at 03:16 UTC.

On 9 November 2013, a published report indicated that the satellite was expected to re-enter within a day or two. By this date, the perigee altitude had decayed to 155 km (96 mi).

On 10 November, ESA expected re-entry to occur between 18:30 and 24:00 UTC that day, with the most probable impact ground swath largely running over ocean and polar regions.

Its descending orbit on 11 November 2013 passed over Siberia, the western Pacific Ocean, the eastern Indian Ocean and Antarctica. The satellite finally disintegrated around 00:16 UTC on 11 November near the Falkland Islands.

== Design ==
=== Payload ===
The satellite's main payload was the Electrostatic Gravity Gradiometer (EGG) to measure the gravity field of Earth. This instrument consisted of three pairs of capacitive accelerometers arranged in three dimensions that responded to tiny variations in the 'gravitational tug' of the Earth as it traveled along its orbital path. Because of their different position in the gravitational field they all experienced the gravitational acceleration of the Earth slightly differently. The three axes of the gradiometer allowed the simultaneous measurement of the five independent components of the gravity gradient tensor.

Other payload was an onboard GPS receiver used as a Satellite-to-Satellite Tracking Instrument (SSTI); a compensation system for all non-gravitational forces acting on the spacecraft. The satellite was also equipped with a laser retroreflector to enable tracking by ground-based Satellite laser ranging stations.

=== Power and propulsion ===
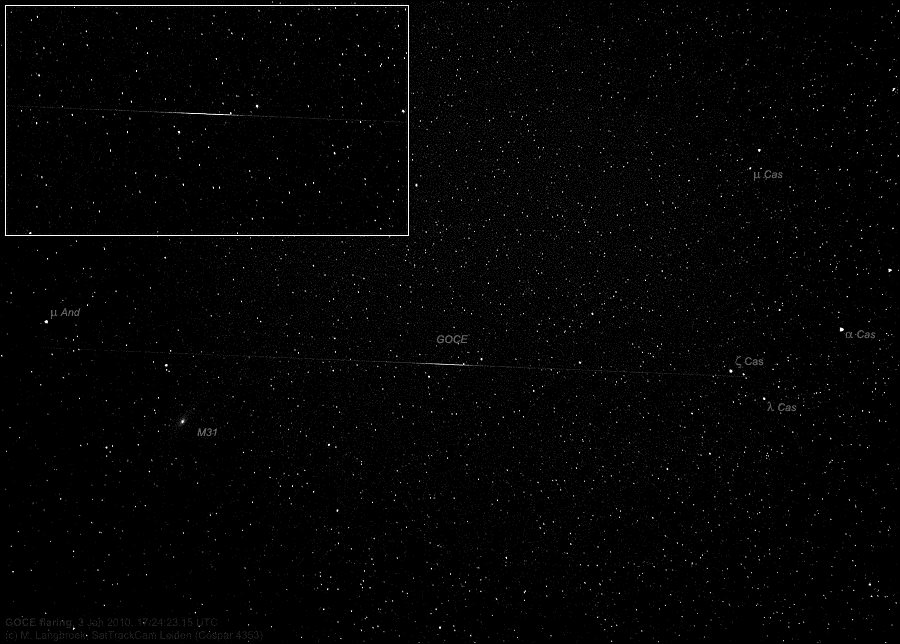
GOCE flares to magnitude +2 as the 67.5 degree solar panel briefly mirrors sunlight (3 January 2010, 17:24:23.15 UTC).

GOCE's 5 × 1.1 m (16 × 4 ft) frame had fixed solar panels covering its sun-facing side, which produced 1,300 watts of power. The panels were shaped to act as fins, stabilising the spacecraft while it orbited through the residual air in the thermosphere.

The ion propulsion electric engine, designed and built at QinetiQ's space centre in Farnborough, England, ejected xenon ions at velocities exceeding 40,000 m/s (140,000 km/h; 89,000 mph), which compensated for the orbital decay losses. GOCE's mission ended when the 40 kg (88 lb) xenon fuel tank emptied. The dual Kaufman-type ion thrusters could produce up to 20 millinewtons (0.0045 lbf) of thrust.

Although its predicted lifetime was 20 months, an ESA report in June 2010 suggested that unusually low solar activity (meaning a calmer upper atmosphere, and hence less drag on the craft) meant the fuel would last longer than its predicted 20 months—possibly into 2014. In reality, the end of mission was formally declared on 21 October 2013 after 55 months, with the final 11 months in a lower orbit (with greater air density and therefore greater fuel use).

== See also ==
- GRACE (NASA; DLR; in orbit 2002–2017) and the follow-up mission GRACE-FO
- SLATS (JAXA), also used ion thrusters to maintain altitude, 2017-2019
- Satellite gravimetry
