= Wilkes Land =

Australian antarctic claim

Coordinates: 69°00′S 120°00′E

Location of Wilkes Land (red), Australian Antarctic Territory in Antarctica

Wilkes Land is a large district of land in eastern Antarctica, formally claimed by Australia as part of the Australian Antarctic Territory, though this claim has been held in abeyance for the period of the operation of the Antarctic Treaty, to which Australia is a signatory.

== Geography ==
Wilkes Land fronts on the southern Indian Ocean between Queen Mary Coast and Adelie Land, extending from Cape Hordern in 100°31' E to Pourquoi Pas Point, in 136°11' E. The region extends as a sector about 2600 km towards the South Pole, with an estimated land area of 2,600,000 km², mostly glaciated.

=== Subdivisions ===
Subdivisions of Wilkes Land, Australian Antarctic Territory in Antarctica Knox Coast Budd Coast Sabrina Coast Banzare Coast Clarie Coast Australian Antarctic Territory Antarctica

It is further subdivided in the following coastal areas which can also be thought of as sectors extending to the South Pole:

1. Knox Coast: 100°31' E to 109°16' E
2. Budd Coast: 109°16' E to 115°33' E
3. Sabrina Coast: 115°33' E to 122°05' E
4. Banzare Coast: 122°05' E to 130°10' E
5. Clarie Coast: (Wilkes Coast) 130°10' E to 136°11' E

In a wider sense, Wilkes Land extends further East to Point Alden in 142°02' E, thereby including Adélie Land, which is claimed by France.

== Name ==
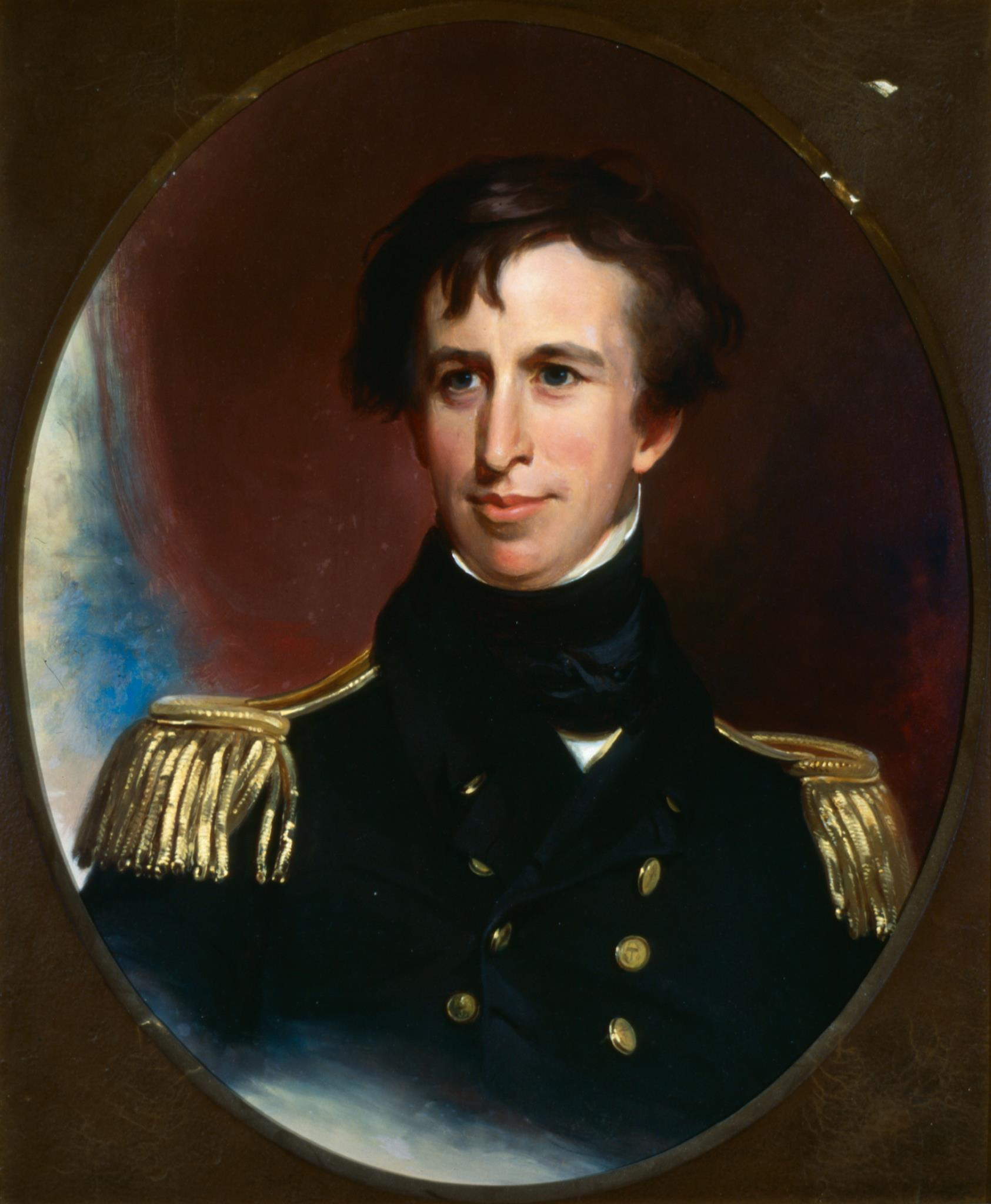
Wilkes Land gets its name from Lieutenant Charles Wilkes, commander of the United States Exploring Expedition

Wilkes Land is named after Lieutenant Charles Wilkes (later a rear admiral), the American explorer who commanded the 1838–1842 United States Exploring Expedition. The naming is in recognition of Wilkes' discovery of the continental margin over a distance of 2,400 km (1,500 miles) of coast, thus providing substantial proof that Antarctica is a continent. This definition of extent excludes the area east of 142°02' E, George V Land, which was sighted by Wilkes but has been shown by later expeditions to be further south than the positions originally assigned by him.

== Geology ==
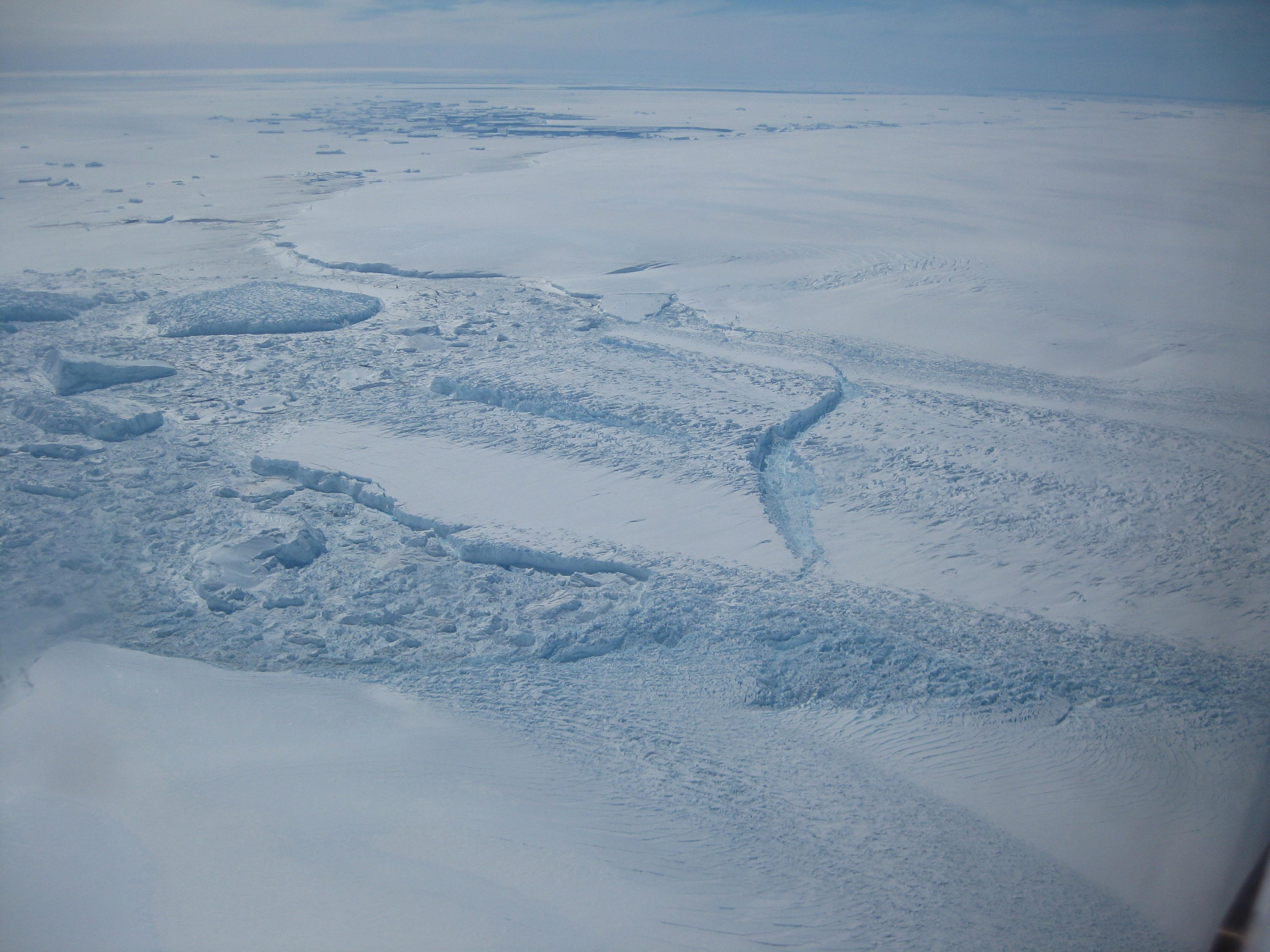
The ice front of Dibble Ice Shelf, a significant melt water producer from the Wilkes Land region, East Antarctica

In 2006, a team of researchers led by Ralph von Frese and Laramie Potts used gravity measurements by NASA's GRACE satellites to discover the 300-mile-wide Wilkes Land crater, which probably formed about 250 million years ago.

== In popular culture ==
Wilkes Land is featured prominently in the 1998 film The X-Files. Fox Mulder journeys to Antarctica to save his partner Dana Scully, who is being held there against her will. In the process, they discover a huge secret lab under the surface run by the Cigarette-Smoking Man.

== See also ==
- Adélie Valley
