= Health in Yemen =

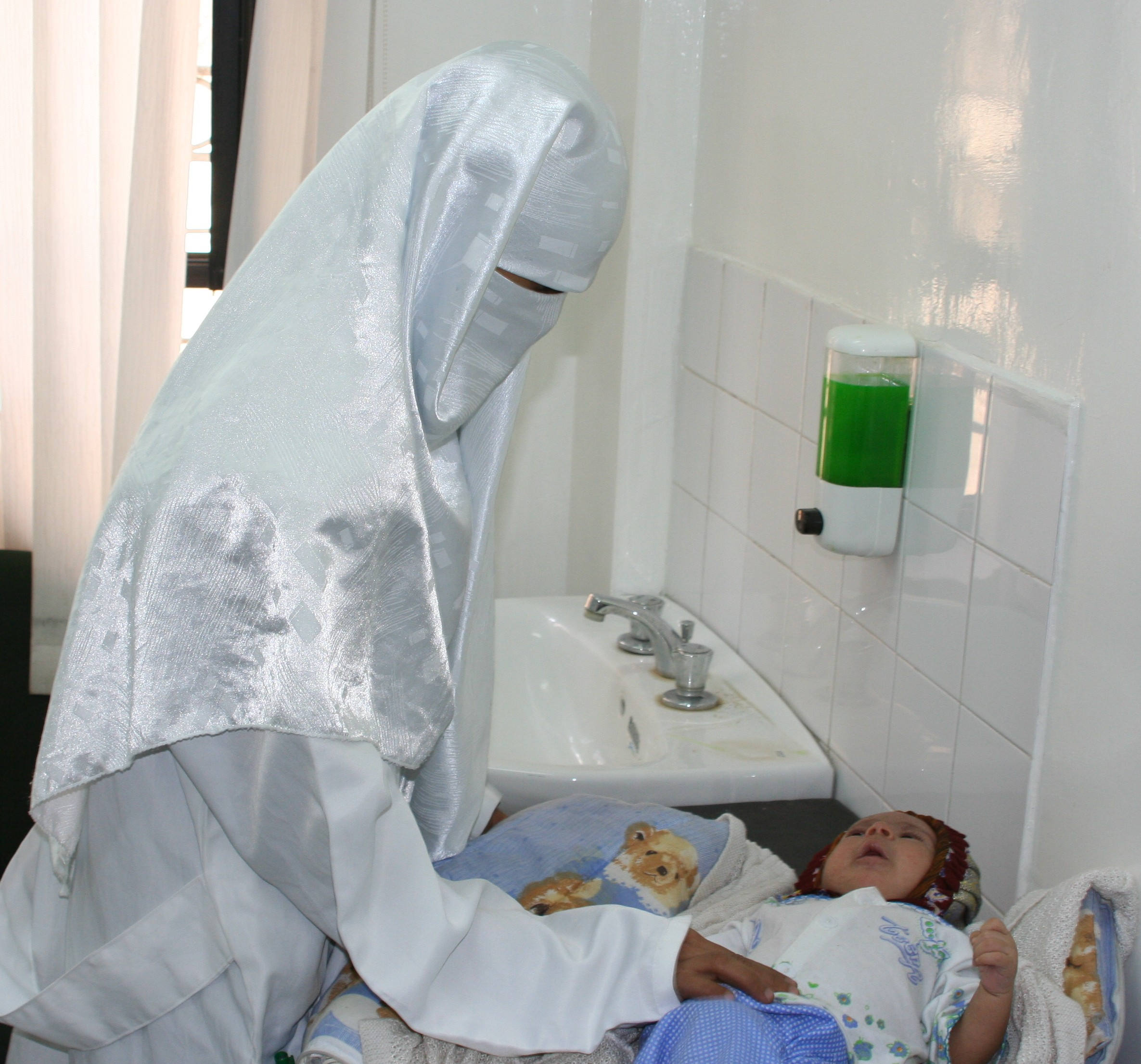
A female Yemeni doctor examines an infant.

Despite the significant progress Yemen has made to expand and improve its health care system over the past decade, the system remains severely underdeveloped. Total expenditures on health care in 2002 constituted 3.7 percent of gross domestic product.

In that same year, the per capita expenditure for health care was very low, as compared with other Middle Eastern countries—US$58 according to United Nations statistics and US$23 according to the World Health Organization. According to the World Bank, the number of doctors in Yemen rose by an average of more than 7 percent between 1995 and 2000, but as of 2004 there were still only three doctors per 10,000 persons. In 2003 Yemen had only 0.6 hospital beds available per 1,000 persons.

Health care services are particularly scarce in rural areas. Only 25 percent of rural areas are covered by health services, as compared with 80 percent of urban areas. Emergency services, such as ambulance service and blood banks, are non-existent.

== Health status ==
The life expectancy in Yemen in 2019 is 66.1 years. Despite the significant progress Yemen has made to expand and improve its health care system over the past decade, the system remains severely underdeveloped. Total expenditures on health care in 2014 constituted 5.64% of gross domestic product. In the same year, the per capita expenditure for health care was US$202 per capita.

The number of doctors in Yemen rose by an average of more than 7% between 1995 and 2000. as of 2014 there were 5.25 doctors per 10,000 people. In 2014 Yemen had 7 hospital beds available per 10,000 persons. Health care services are particularly scarce in rural areas. 25% of rural areas are covered by health services, compared with 80% of urban areas. Most childhood deaths are caused by illnesses for which vaccines exist or that are otherwise preventable.

In c. 2009, Sana'a may be the first capital city in the world to run out of drinking water.

=== Prior to the crisis ===
Prior to the current conflict, Yemen's health care system was weak due to its lack of spending in public healthcare. During the mid-2000s Yemen decided to take a market-based approach to their healthcare system due to increased liberalization within the country. However, this market based approach directly affected the poor and those living in rural areas, because of a decrease in Yemen's budget in public healthcare and use of user fees. Access to healthcare services is highly determined by geographic location. Although Yemen's constitution promises healthcare for all, only 25% of those living in rural areas have access to healthcare services compared to the 80% that have access to healthcare services in urban areas. In addition, most hospitals are in urban areas which makes accessibility difficult for those living in rural areas.

Yemen's public healthcare system is composed of four levels:

1. 2929 primary health care units
2. 184 district hospitals
3. 53 general hospitals
4. 2 specialist referral hospitals

However, many of these facilities lack resources and employees due to the small budget spent on public healthcare in Yemen. However, in 2002 Yemen created the District Healthcare System (DHS) in order to deliver primary health care through community-based services, which in the end failed due to poor management. On the other hand, Yemen's private sector has succeeded: there were 167 private hospitals in 2002 and by 2012 there were 746 private hospitals. Yemen's healthcare system prior to the current conflict was weak, however, is still better than now.

=== During the crisis ===
Currently, only 45% of healthcare facilities in Yemen are functioning and accessible to the public, while 247 healthcare facilities have been destroyed and damaged by the ongoing conflict. In addition, healthcare facilities that are still functioning lack the resources and employees to provide the appropriate healthcare service because humanitarian aide is restricted by the constant fighting, airstrikes, bombardments, and lack of ceasefire. It is dangerous for humanitarian workers to set foot on the ground because they could be easily killed due to the constant fighting by both parties. Many hospitals and clinics have had shortages in vaccines, medical equipment, and basic drugs due to the ongoing conflict. Therefore, while healthcare facilities are working they lack the equipment and employees to provide all of those in need with help. In 2017, the UN reported that healthcare facilities had not been given sufficient funds and that healthcare workers were working without salaries since September 2016. As a result, healthcare workers are quitting and facilities are losing staff in a time of need. At the same time, many patients are not able to afford the hospital service fees, even though they are cheap. Due to the high demand of healthcare services, local volunteers and medical students have been trained to respond to basic needs during emergencies. It is estimated that 14.8 million people in Yemen currently lack healthcare and that 22 million people are in need of humanitarian assistance.

=== During the conflict ===
Since the beginning of the conflict, the people of Yemen have become more susceptible to diseases and long-lasting health problems. More and more people are dying from treatable diseases because of the weakened healthcare system. According to the UN, since the escalation of the conflict in March 2015, more than 7,600 people have died and about 42,000 people have been injured.

According to Al Jazeera, outdated medical equipment, airport closures, and budget cuts are jeopardizing patient outcomes in Yemen. More than a decade of war in Yemen has taken a heavy toll on the healthcare system. People in the country are unable to afford treatment for serious illnesses, such as cancer, due to restrictions on travel abroad for treatment, a lack of medical facilities, and insufficient resources.

==== Malnutrition ====
Children are highly suffering from acute malnutrition. According to the World Health Organization, more than 1.8 million children under the age of five are suffering from acute malnutrition and 500,000 children under five years old are suffering from severe acute malnutrition. A study shows that global acute malnutrition (GAM) 12.5% from 2013 to 2016 in children under five years old. In addition, the study shows that the national average of women between the ages of 15 and 49 suffering from severe malnutrition was 11.4%. However, from 2013 to 2016 it decreased by 1.6%. According to the UN, in total 4.5 million people in Yemen are suffering from malnutrition.

==== Mortality rates ====
According to a study, in the journal Globalization and Health, child mortality rates for those under five years old have increased nationally. In 2013 there were 53 deaths per 1,000 live births and in 2016 it was 56.8 deaths per 1,000 live births. In 2016, national average maternal mortality was 213.4 deaths per 100,000 live births, which was a 1.3% increase from 2013.

==== Cholera ====
Currently, according to WHO, Yemen is suffering the worst cholera outbreak in history with an estimated more than 10,000 cases a week in 2018. Cholera is caused by lack of clean water, according to WHO 19.3 million Yemenis lack access to clean water and sanitation.

=== Infant mortality rate ===
In 1950, the child mortality rate in Yemen was 370 children per 1000 births. Yemen then made significant progress, with the rate falling to 58.6 children per 1000 births in 2015. Subsequently, the ongoing cholera outbreak caused the death toll of children to rise. As of 2018, more than 20 million Yemeni people are in need of humanitarian assistance, including 9 million children.

Malnutrition is one of the leading causes of child mortality. By 2018, about two million Yemeni children suffered from acute malnutrition, as a result of the civil war consuming their nation's economy. Geographically, Yemen also has the world's most depleted water sources. According to UNICEF, nearly 462,000 children are suffering from severe acute malnutrition. By November 2018, an estimated 85,000 children under the age of five had died due to acute malnutrition over the three years of the war. This number does not include children missing, displaced, or currently medically unstable.

Abuse and the exploitation of children in Yemen has become common practice with the continuation of the civil war between the Houthi rebels and Yemeni government forces. A reported 6,500 children have been killed or injured from violence as the country's infrastructure collapses. It is reported that upwards of 800 children being recruited to participate in the civil war.

=== Disease ===
Cholera has broken out within Yemen because of its poor infrastructure that deteriorated due widespread war in the country. Yemen faces issues in control and provisions of fresh, clean water as Yemen does not have the capacity to create the infrastructure needed to provide it; thus, people are forced to obtain unsanitary water from rivers, lakes, and wells. Cholera is prominently found in contaminated drinking water, making the Yemeni people, especially children, the most prone to such a disease. There have been more than 815,000 suspected cases of cholera in Yemen over the past three years, 60% percent of them being children. Cholera can be found throughout a majority of Yemen, mostly concentrated in the cities closest to water. Cholera currently kills an estimated 95,000 people per year and infects upwards of 2.9 million people.

Diphtheria has spread throughout Yemen. Upwards of 1,300 people have been infected as of March 2018, 80% of cases being children. As of February 21, 2018, there have been 66 reported deaths from Diphtheria.

=== Foreign assistance ===
UNICEF has made a huge effort in fighting the war against the cholera epidemic with major efforts of providing vaccines help immunize the Yemeni people. There have been 900,000 suspected cholera cases and can be treated. They've launched various campaigns to help combat diseases such as whooping cough, pneumonia, tetanus, tuberculosis, diphtheria, and meningitis, and they continue to send vaccines to the Yemeni people As of December 4, 2018, the United States has funded approximately US$696 million in humanitarian funding for Yemen. Humanitarian organizations have created huge impacts in Yemen by providing health, nutrition, and food provisions for the impacted. The KSA and United Arab Emirates have also supported food and nutritional support by pledging US$500 million to help provide for 12 million Yemeni people.

The World Health Organization has provided substantial aid to Yemen and continues its efforts in creating a sustainable health system. In 2016, the World Health Organization created functional health facilities including 414 operating sites within 145 districts including of over 400 mobile health and nutrition teams in another 266 districts throughout Yemen. They've also provided extensive child health nutrition interventions in over 300 districts and have established 26 cholera treatment centers. They are the leading effort in polio immunization treating over 4.5 million children under the age of 5. They've supplied 565 tons of essential vaccines and medical supplies expected to help upwards of 3 million people in conflict impacted areas.

The World Health Organization has provided huge efforts by creating its humanitarian response plan in 2017. Their plan consisted of a US$219.2 million WHO budget and a US$430.4 million Health Sector budget that targeted support for 2.6 million women and 5.8 million children in Yemen. They created four specific objectives in providing aid:

1. Provide health services, response and supervision, and medical supplies to districts
2. Strengthen health sector efficiency and health information systems
3. Increase reproductive, maternal, newborn, and adolescent health interventions, including violence against women
4. Bolster community-based health initiatives and create self-sustaining infrastructure for the health system

They have allocated budgets primarily towards Severe Acute Malnutrition (SAM) and Cholera projects.

== See also ==
- Water supply and sanitation in Yemen
