= Arabian Aquifer System =

Aquifer system in the Arabian Peninsula

The Arabian Aquifer System is primarily located in Saudi Arabia but also in Jordan, Syria, Iraq, Kuwait, Bahrain, Qatar, United Arab Emirates, Oman, and Yemen.

Starting in the 1980s, Saudi Arabia's rapid agricultural development fueled by government involvement and subsidies resulted in a large increase in water being drawn from the aquifers in the system, many of which are non-renewable. In 1995, an estimated 15.2 km^{3} of water was removed from the aquifer per year. By 2004, it is observed many natural springs in the area had dried up and the aquifers were turning brackish. According to NASA's Gravity Recovery and Climate Experiment (GRACE) satellite data (2003–2013) analysed in a University of California, Irvine (UCI)-led study published in Water Resources Research on 16 June 2015, 60 million people depend on it for water and it is the most over-stressed aquifer system in the world. The Saudi agricultural sector was shut down after depleting four fifths of its aquifers, which prompted Saudi Arabia to look for less arid land elsewhere, one example being in Ethiopia, causing water conflict as a result.

== See also ==
- Water supply and sanitation in Saudi Arabia
- Water supply and sanitation in Yemen
