= Ralph von Frese =

American geophysicist

Ralph R. B. von Frese is an American geophysicist at the Ohio State University who identified the Wilkes Land mass concentration in Antarctica in collaboration with Laramie Potts. He is also a professor in the Division of Earth and Planetary Sciences of the School of Earth Sciences at Ohio State University.

== Career ==
In 1969, Frese graduated B.A. cum laude from Park College in physics, mathematics, and German. He earned M.Sc. degrees in physics (1973) and geophysics (1978) and a Ph.D. in geophysics (1980) from Purdue University. He has taught geophysics and Earth systems at OSU since 1982.

He and Potts used gravity measurements by NASA's GRACE satellites to identify a 200-mile (300 km) wide mass concentration. This mass anomaly is centered within a larger ring-like structure visible in radar images of the land surface beneath the Antarctic ice cap. This combination led these researchers to speculate that it may have resulted from a large impact event.

Sponsored by NASA, the National Science Foundation, and the hydrocarbon industry, Frese's research is primarily on archaeology, satellite gravity, and magnetic studies of the Earth, moon, and other planets.

Frese has also authored or coauthored several journal publications and served on many government and scientific panels.
