= Cape Southard =

Headland in Antarctica

Cape Southard (66°32′S 122°5′E) is an ice-covered cape separating the Banzare Coast and Sabrina Coast of Wilkes Land. Delineated from air photos taken by U.S. Navy Operation Highjump, 1946–47, and named by the Advisory Committee on Antarctic Names (US-ACAN) for Samuel Lewis Southard, Secretary of the Navy under President John Quincy Adams. While serving as Senator from New Jersey, Southard was instrumental in initiating interest in a government scientific expedition and gaining congressional authorization of the U.S. Exploring Expedition, 1838–1842, under Charles Wilkes.
