= Adélie Valley =

Valley in Antarctica

Adélie Valley (65°30′S 136°0′E), also variously known as Adilie Valley, Dumont d'Urville Trough or Adélie Trough, is a drowned fjord (undersea valley) on the continental margin of East Antarctica. Named in association with this long named portion of Wilkes Land on the Antarctic coast. Name approved by the Advisory Committee on Undersea Features in December 1971.
