= Clarie Coast =

Coast in eastern Antarctica

Location of Clarie Coast (red) in Wilkes Land, Australian Antarctic Territory

Clarie Coast, called Wilkes Coast by Australia, (66°30′S 133°0′E) is that portion of the coast of Wilkes Land lying between Cape Morse, at 130°10′E, and Pourquoi Pas Point, at 136°11′E. It was discovered in January 1840 by Captain Jules Dumont d'Urville, who recognized the existence of land lying south of the ice cliffs to which he applied the name Côte de Clarie, after the wife (Claire-Fortunée Roze) of Charles Jacquinot, the captain of his second ship, the Zélée.

It was also spotted by the US Exploring Expedition in February 1840.
