= Sabrina Coast =

Location of Sabrina Coast (red) in Wilkes Land, Australian Antarctic Territory.

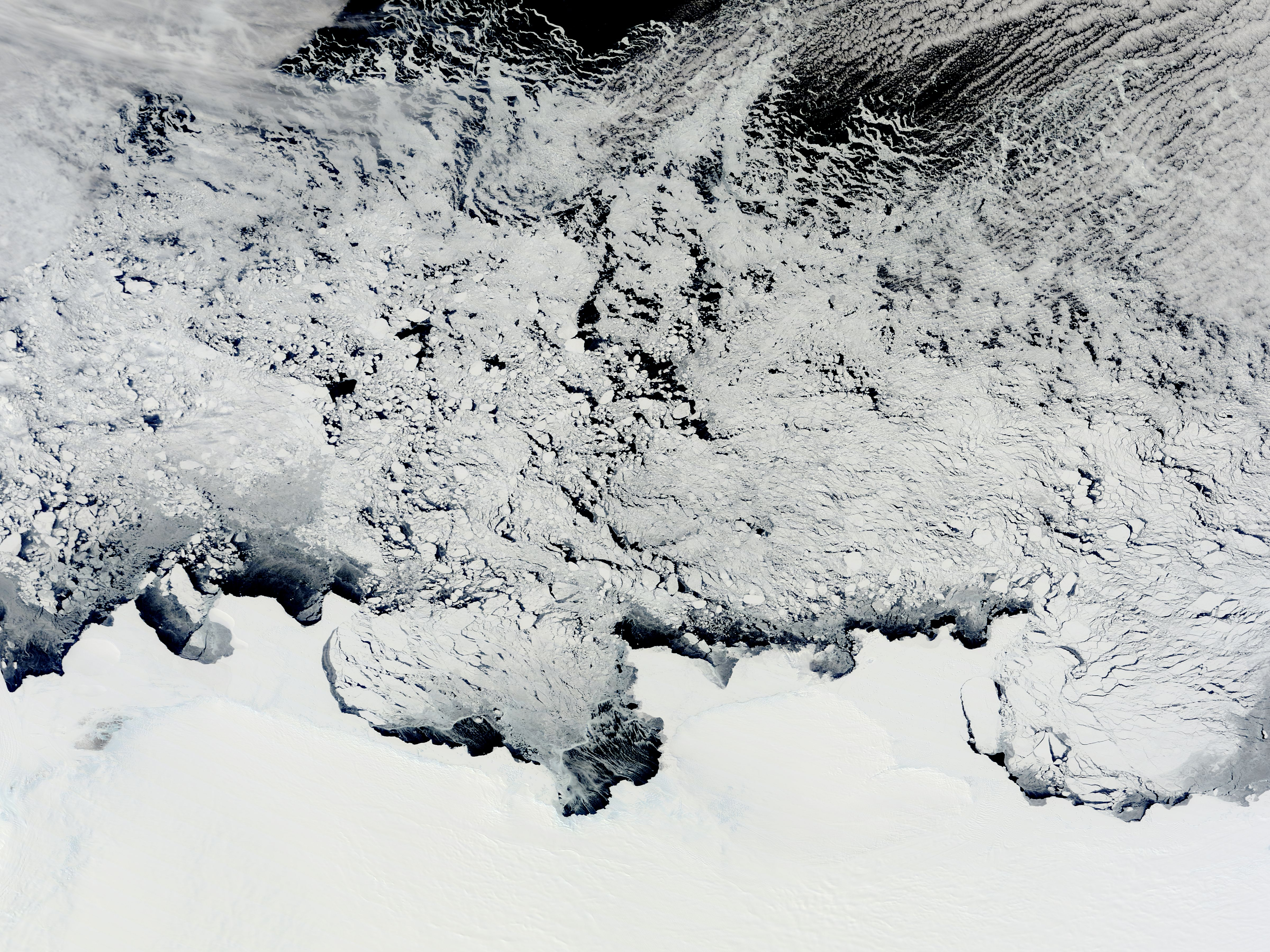
NASA MODIS satellite image of Knox, Budd and Sabrina coasts

Sabrina Coast (67°20′S 119°0′E) is that portion of the coast of Wilkes Land, Antarctica, lying between Cape Waldron, at 115° 33' E, and Cape Southard, at 122° 05' E. John Balleny has long been credited with having seen land in March 1839 at about 117° E.

The United States Exploring Expedition under Lt. Charles Wilkes approached this coast in February 1840 and indicated its general configuration as shown in part by "Totten High Land" on his 1840 chart. In 1931 the British Australian New Zealand Antarctic Research Expedition (BANZARE) under Douglas Mawson saw what appeared to be land in this longitude about one degree farther south than that reported by Balleny and Wilkes. In recognition of Balleny's effort, Mawson retained the name of the cutter Sabrina, one of Balleny's ships which was lost in a storm at 95°E in the latter part of March 1839.
