= Banzare Coast =

Portion of Antarctica coast

Location of Banzare Coast (red) in Wilkes Land, Australian Antarctic Territory.

Banzare Coast (67°S 126°E), part of Wilkes Land, is that portion of the coast of Antarctica lying between Cape Southard, at 122°05′E, and Cape Morse, at 130°10′E.

This coast was spotted by the US Exploring Expedition in Feb. 1840.

It was seen from the air by the British-Australian-New Zealand Antarctic Research Expedition, in 1930–1931, led by Douglas Mawson. The name by Mawson is an acronym of the expedition title.
