= Laramie Potts =

Laramie Potts is an American scientist who identified the Wilkes Land mass concentration in Antarctica in collaboration with Ralph von Frese. He is from South Africa. He is an associate professor in the School of Applied Engineering and Technology and teaches geomatics (surveying) at the New Jersey Institute of Technology (NJIT).

== Education ==
Potts received his B.S. in Land Surveying in 1984 at the University of Cape Town, his M.S. (1993) and Ph.D. (2000) in Geodetic Science and Surveying at The Ohio State University and an M.B.A. (2016) from the NJIT.

== Research ==
He and von Frese used gravity measurements by NASA's GRACE satellites to identify a 200-mile (300 km) wide mass concentration. This mass anomaly is centered within a larger ring-like structure visible in radar images of the land surface beneath the Antarctic ice cap. This combination led these researchers to speculate that it may be the result of a large impact event.

== Consulting ==
Potts is part of the leadership team at Northeast Consulting Group, LLC.
