= Wilkes Land crater =

Hypothesized impact structure beneath the East Antarctic Ice Sheet

Wilkes Land crater is a hypothesized giant impact structure beneath the East Antarctic Ice Sheet in Wilkes Land, East Antarctica. The hypothesis is based on indirect geophysical observations, especially regional gravity anomalies and subglacial topography. It remains unconfirmed because the site is buried under ice and there are no direct bedrock samples to test for diagnostic impact evidence.

The name is used in connection with two candidate features discussed in published sources. The Wilkes Land anomaly refers to a general, large-scale gravity anomaly associated with a subglacial depression that has several proposed origins, including an impact structure. The Wilkes Land mascon refers to the specific positive gravity signal, a mascon, inferred from satellite gravimetry (including GRACE) and interpreted by some authors as consistent with a large impact basin.

== Wilkes Land anomaly ==
A giant impact crater beneath the Wilkes Land ice sheet was first proposed by Richard A. Schmidt in 1962 on the basis of the seismic and gravity discovery of the feature made by the U.S. Victoria Land Traverse in 1959–60 (VLT), and the data provided to Schmidt by John G. Weihaupt, geophysicist of the VLT (Geophysical Studies in Victoria Land, Antarctica, Report No. 1, Geophysical and Polar Research Center, University of Wisconsin, 1–123). Schmidt further considered the possibility that it might be the elusive source of the tektites of the Australasian strewnfield (which is only 790,000 years old).

EGM2008 gravity anomaly map

The hypothesis was detailed in a paper by Weihaupt in 1976. Evidence cited included a large negative gravity anomaly coincident with a subglacial topographic depression 243 kilometres (151 mi) across and having a minimum depth of 848 metres (2,782 ft).

The claims were challenged by Charles R. Bentley in 1979. On the basis of a 2010 paper by Weihaupt et al., Bentley's challenge was proven to be incorrect, and the Earth Impact Database (Rajmon 2011) reclassified the Wilkes Land Anomaly from a "possible impact crater" to a "probable impact crater" on that basis. A potential impact crater site has been proposed by other investigators in the Ross Sea.

== Mass concentration ==
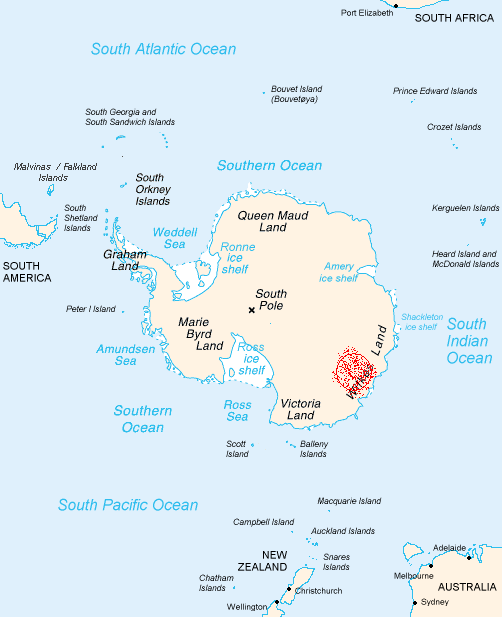
Map of Antarctica showing Wilkes Land, with the crater conjectured by von Frese et al. marked in red

The Wilkes Land mass concentration (or mascon) is centered at 70°S 120°E and was first reported at a conference in May 2006 by a team of researchers led by Ralph von Frese and Laramie Potts of Ohio State University.

The team used gravity measurements by NASA's GRACE satellites to identify a 300-kilometre-wide (190 mi) mass concentration and noted that this mass anomaly is centered within a larger ring-like structure visible in radar images of the land surface beneath the Antarctic ice cap. That combination suggested to them that the feature may mark the site of a 480-kilometre-wide (300 mi) impact crater buried beneath the ice and more than 2.5 times larger than the 180-kilometre (110 mi) Chicxulub crater.

Due to the site's location beneath the Antarctic ice sheet, there are no direct samples to test for evidence of impact. There are alternative explanations for this mass concentration, such as formation by a mantle plume or other large-scale volcanic activity, but a variety of research methods lend support to the impact hypothesis. If the impact crater hypothesis is correct, based on the size of the ring structure, it has been suggested by Frese's team that the impactor could have been four or five times wider than the Chicxulub impactor, which is believed to have caused the Cretaceous–Paleogene extinction event.

Because mass concentrations on Earth are expected to dissipate over time, Frese and his collaborators believe the structure must be less than 500 million years old and also note that it appears to have been disturbed by the rift valley that formed 100 million years ago, during the separation of Australia from the Gondwana supercontinent.

The researchers speculate that the putative impact and associated crater may have contributed to this separation by weakening the Earth's crust at this location. These bracketing dates also make it possible that the site could be associated with the Permian–Triassic extinction event. The Permian–Triassic extinction occurred 250 million years ago and is believed to be the largest extinction event since the origin of complex multicellular life.

Plate reconstructions for the Permian–Triassic boundary place the putative crater directly antipodal to the Siberian Traps, and Frese et al. (2009) use the controversial theory that impacts can trigger massive volcanism at their antipodes to bolster their impact crater theory. However, there are already other suggested candidates for giant impacts at the Permian–Triassic boundary, such as Bedout, off the northern coast of Western Australia, although all are equally contentious and it is currently under debate whether or not an impact played any role in this extinction.

The complete absence of a well-defined impact ejecta layer associated with the Permian–Triassic boundary at its outcrops within Victoria Land and the central Transantarctic Mountains argues against there having been any impact capable of creating a crater the size of the hypothesized Wilkes Land impact crater within Antarctica at the Permian–Triassic boundary. Nonetheless, according to Frese, recent studies in 2018 seem to sustain the impact origin of the crater, and the event may be linked to the separation of Eastern Antarctica from southern Australia.

== See also ==
- Bedout
- Chicxulub crater
- Cretaceous–Paleogene extinction event
- List of possible impact structures on Earth
- Permian–Triassic extinction event
- Siberian Traps
- Vredefort impact structure
