= Hot stain =

Region of the world where safe drinking water has been depleted

A hot stain is a region of the world where safe drinking water has been depleted. The term may have been coined by Goldman Environmental Prize winning hydrologist Michal Kravcik. Hot stains can be found on every continent, except for Antarctica. The biggest reason for a hot stain to develop is population pressure. As the population grows, water demand increases. Although the earth is covered in 97% water, only 1% of that water is available for human consumption. Hot stains can cause great harm to a regions agricultural ability and can lead to food scarcity, famine, and even the abandonment of the region.

Maude Barlow an environmental activist, head of the Council of Canadians, and founder of the Blue Planet Project has used the term 'hot stain' in regard to water resources. In 2005, Maude Barlow received Sweden's Right Livelihood Award.

== Water resources ==
'Hot stains' areas are one term given where water reserves are disappearing. These areas include the Middle East, Northern China, Mexico, California and almost two dozen countries in Africa. Today thirty-one countries and over 1 billion people completely lack access to clean water. The global freshwater crisis looms as one of the greatest threats ever to the survival of our planet according to Maude Barlow and Tony Clarke in an article in The Nation magazine.

== See also ==
- Fossil water
- Potable water
- Peak water
- Global warming
- Deforestation
- Water contamination
