= Water supply and sanitation in Yemen =

Data
- Access to an improved water source: 55% (2014)
- Access to improved sanitation: 53% (2014)
- Continuity of supply: Mostly not continuous
- Average urban water use (L/person/day): Between 37 (in Taiz) and 94 (in Aden)

Institutions
- Decentralization to municipalities: Yes
- National water and sanitation company: Being phased out (NWSA)
- Water and sanitation regulator: Planned
- Responsibility for policy setting: Ministry of Water and Environment
- Sector law: Yes (2002), focused on water resources
- No. of urban service providers: 15

Water supply and sanitation in Yemen are characterized by multiple challenges as well as some achievements. A key challenge is severe water scarcity, especially in the Highlands, prompting The Times of London to write "Yemen could become the first nation to run out of water". A second major obstacle is a high level of poverty, making it very difficult to recover the costs of service provision and infrastructure maintenance. Access to baseline water supply and sanitation in Yemen is as low as, or even lower than that in many sub-Saharan African countries. Yemen is both the poorest country and the most water-scarce country in the Arab world. Third, the capacity of sector institutions to plan, build, operate and maintain infrastructure is severely limited. Finally, the ongoing conflicts and instability make it even harder to improve or even maintain existing levels of service.

The average Yemeni has access to only 80 to 86 cubic meters of water per year (58-62 gallons per day) for all uses, far below the internationally defined threshold for absolute water scarcity of 500 cubic meters per year, and much lower than the Middle Eastern regional average. Yemen's groundwater is the main source of water in the country, but the water tables have been severely depleted, leaving the country without a viable source of water. In the critical highland basins, including Sanaa and Taiz, the natural water tables are dropping by 1 to 8 meters each year. This has forced public and private well-drilling to reach deep fossil aquifers at excavation depths exceeding 1,000 meters in some areas. The groundwater has not been regulated effectively by Yemen's governments. Even before the conflicts, Yemen's water conditions were described as increasingly dire by experts, who worried that Yemen would be the "first country to run out of water". Agriculture in Yemen takes up about 90% of water in Yemen even though it only generates 6% of the nation's GDP. However, a large portion of Yemenis are dependent on small-scale subsistence farming. About half of agricultural water in Yemen is used to grow khat, a psychoactive plant that most Yemenis chew. This means that in such a water-scarce country as Yemen, where half the population is food-insecure, 45% of the water withdrawn from the ever-depleting aquifers is used to grow a narcotic crop rather than addressing widespread food insecurity.

Following the 2015 Yemeni Civil War, the water shortage situation became increasingly dire, causing a widespread humanitarian and public health crisis. Between 14.4 million and 17.8 million people—about half of whom are children—struggle to access safe water, sanitation, and hygiene (WASH) services. Fighting has forced millions of internally displaced Yemenis to relocated. Consequentially, wells in these areas went under increasing pressure. Additionally, water infrastructures, including municipal pipelines and coastal desalination plants, were targeted during the conflict. For example, on January 8, 2016, a major desalination plant in the city of Mokha was destroyed by a Saudi bomb, which caused the disruption of water supply not only in Mokha but also in Taiz. Centralized power grid failures and the high cost of fuel have heavily damaged public pumping stations, forcing more than 70% of the population to rely entirely on expensive, unregulated private water markets and mobile water tankers. Additionally, global warming and human overpopulation have also been contributing to the destruction of Yemen's water supply. This persistent lack of clean drinking water and functional sanitation utilities directly triggered serious public health emergencies, including historically severe outbreaks of cholera and waterborne illnesses. Over 2000 people died from the highly contagious bacterial infection in the four months from April to August 2017. To prevent a total cessation of public networks, international aid operations have managed to partially bypass the collapsed grid by transitioning urban and rural pumping stations to decentralized solar energy systems.

== Access ==
=== Historical access trends (1990–2014) ===
In 2014, around 11.2 million people lacked access to "improved" water, while around 11.5 million people did not have access to "improved" sanitation in Yemen.

In 2012, 55% of the total population had access to "improved" water, divided as 72% of the urban population and 47% of the rural population. As for sanitation, in 2012, 53% of the total population had access to "improved" sanitation, (93% of the urban population and 34% of the rural population).

Running water is available in many parts of the country, but most villages remain have no access to it. Women in remote areas typically draw water from wells or from cisterns, sometimes walking up to two hours each way twice a day. They may carry the water in pots on their heads or load them onto donkeys.

Statistics on access to water supply and sanitation in Yemen are contradictory. For example, the data from the latest census, carried out in 1997, are very different from data in a Demographic and Health Survey (DHS) carried out in the same year. According to the census, 61% or urban households had access to water connections in their home, while according to the DHS the same figure was 70%, but for rural areas the order is reversed. The census gives higher figures for access to house connections (25%) than the DHS (19%). The latest data used by the United Nations are from the 2004 Family and Health Survey and the 2006 Multiple Indicator Cluster Survey. Estimates for 2011 are made based on an extrapolation of trends from previous years.

In 2011, the United Nations' Joint Monitoring Programme for Water Supply and Sanitation (JMP) estimated that only 55% of the Yemeni population had access to improved water source – including 40% from house connections and 15% from other improved water sources such as standpipes. Only 53% had access to improved sanitation. Access to improved water supply, using a broad definition of access, is estimated to be much higher in urban areas than in rural areas (72% vs. 47%). The urban-rural gap is much higher for improved sanitation (93% vs. 33%). Because of the rapid population growth, access to water supply actually declined in relative terms from 66% in 1990 to 55% in 2011 despite a substantial increase in absolute access. However, access to improved sanitation increased from 24% to 53% during the same period, according to the estimates. By 2012, this baseline remained similar, with 55% of Yemenis maintaining access to improved water (72% urban, 47% rural) and 53% holding access to improved sanitation (93% urban, 34% rural). By 2014, around 11.2 million people lacked access to improved water, and approximately 11.5 million people did not have access to improved sanitation.

=== Impact of conflict on current access (2020s) ===
The escalation of armed conflict undid historical gains, causing structural collapse across both urban and rural water networks. According to United Nations humanitarian assessments, more than 17.8 million people inside Yemen lack sufficient access to safe water, sanitation, and hygiene (WASH) services, half of whom are children. The complete decay of centralized public utilities has forced over 70% of the population to rely entirely on expensive, unregulated private water markets, mainly by mobile water tankers and informal neighborhood commercial wells.

Rural communities remain severely affected by the war. In remote villages which don't have pipe systems, the physical work of water collection continues to fall mainly on women and children, who need to travel up to two hours each way to draw water from vulnerable wells or old cisterns. This dynamic is one of the factors that contributes to high school dropout rates among rural girls. Because of the loss of centralized electrical grids and no public financing, the sustainability of remaining localized water services relies largely on international aid interventions, which focus on switching local city and village networks to decentralized solar-powered pumping systems to keep minimal water supplies functioning.

== Service quality ==
Service quality for water supply and sanitation has several aspects. For example, water supply service quality can be measured by the continuity of supply, which is generally low in Yemen, or customer satisfaction, which is high. One indicator of the service quality of sanitation is the effectiveness of wastewater treatment plants in removing pollutants, which is often low in Yemen.

=== Continuity of water supply ===
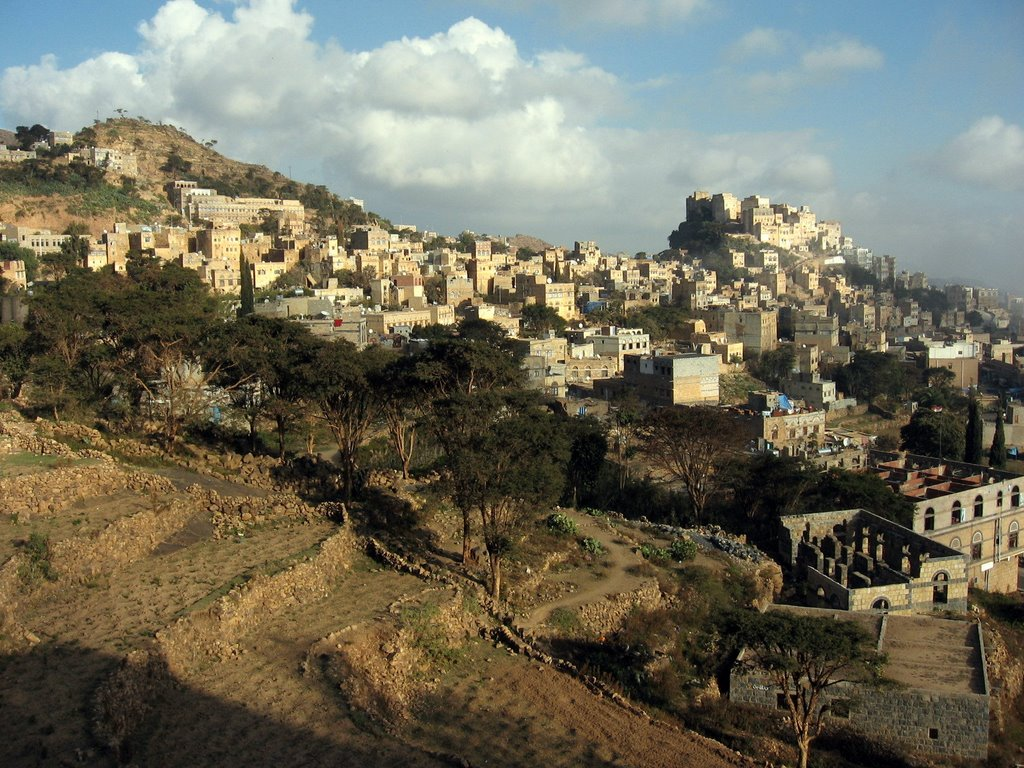
In the town of Mahwit, piped water comes less than once a week.

Continuity of water supply is poor in most Yemeni cities, and has been deteriorating into a severe crisis due to ongoing conflict and infrastructure decay.

==== Pre-war baseline (2007–2008) ====
According to a survey performed in 2007 by the Ministry of Water and Environment (MWE), municipal water deliveries have been highly intermittent. For example, in Taiz, public piped water is delivered only about once every 40 days. More and more people had to rely on more costly water supplied by private wells and water tankers. The quality of this water was questionable because these tankers were often cross contaminated. According to MWE, in 2007 only 15 out of 23 urban water utilities reported providing water daily for between 12 and 24 hours. However, these metrics did not distinguish between continuous supply and intermittent moderate (more than 12 hours daily water) supply. The 15 utilities were included in cities like Sanaa and Aden, which provide intermittent water supply. Four other towns provided water on a daily basis, but for less than 12 hours per day. During this period, the city of Ibb and the town of Bajil provided water only once a week, with utilities in Taiz and Mahwit delivered water less than once a week. There were conflicting data about the continuity of supply. For example, MWE reported that water was being provided daily in Amran in 2007, while 100% of the respondents to a household survey living there indicated that they had access to water weekly or even monthly in 2008.

==== Systemic collapse and current status (2026) ====
Following years of armed conflict, state neglect, and fuel blockades, the remaining operational capacity of Local Corporations (LCs) of potable water has severely collapsed. By 2026, the average per capita share of annual renewable freshwater in Yemen dropped to between 80 and 86 cubic meters—much less than the international absolute water scarcity threshold of 500 cubic meters. Groundwater in critical highland basins, including Sanaa, Saada, and Taiz, is being pumped at twice the natural replenishment rate, causing local water tables to drop by up to 6 meters each year, and forcing public and private well-drilling to reach increased depths.

Centralized power grid failures and the elevated cost of diesel fuel have eventually eliminated relatively reliable municipal pipeline continuity. To prevent a total cessation of water supply, international humanitarian interventions by agencies such as the World Bank and UNOPS switched dozens of urban pumping stations to decentralized solar energy networks in municipalities like Al-Shihr, Dhamar, and Amran.

Despite the efforts to solarize the water infrastructure, overall degradation remains severe. Many people in the cities still rely on more expensive water supplied by unregulated private wells and mobile water tankers, the quality of which is problematic due to improper tank cleaning. Distribution of water by pipes in cities remains poor; Taiz remains the most severely affected major area, where public piped water is delivered sometimes once every 30 to 40 days. The lack of continuous clean water has left an estimated 14.4 million people in need of urgent Water, Sanitation, and Hygiene (WASH) humanitarian assistance.

=== Customer satisfaction ===
Historically, public satisfaction with urban water utilities was very high despite poor delivery schedules. According to a survey carried out in 2008 in 7 towns, 88% of the customers of water utilities reported that they were satisfied with the service level of their water utility, and only 9% were dissatisfied. Even in the city of Ibb, where water supply is intermittent, 47% of customers declared they were satisfied. In the town of Amran, where the situation was similar, even more customers - 74% - were satisfied. It may be that customers have become accustomed to poor service quality and have correspondingly lowered their expectations. 77% of households said that they drank tap water.

Following the outbreak of the civil war and the breakdown of municipals piped infrastructure, Yemenis can no longer rely on tap water. Because public utilities are widely non-active or highly irregular, urban Yemenis have been forced into an almost total dependence on commercial private water trucks and unregulated local neighborhood wells. Public satisfaction has dropped sharply as a consequence of high private water pricing, which burdens a large portion of average household income, combined with growing public health concerns regarding chemical and bacterial contamination inside unmonitored private supply chains.

=== Wastewater treatment ===
Yemen has historically operated more than 17 urban and more than 15 rural wastewater treatment plants. They were using the following technologies:

- Activated sludge in Sanaa and Ibb (2)
- Imhoff tanks or trickling filters in Hajjah (1)
- Imhoff tanks followed by stabilization ponds in Zabid (1)
- Septic tanks followed by stabilization ponds in Al Mahwait (1)
- Stabilization ponds: Aden, al-Hodeidah, Bajil, Thamr, Yarim, Al-Bayda, Radaa, 'Amran, Bayt Al-Faqih (9) and other cities or towns.

According to a 2002 report by staff from the Yemeni Environment Protection Agency, there were also wastewater treatment plants in Taiz, Dhamar, Yarim, and Radaa. Most of the plants use the stabilization pond technology. The largest wastewater treatment plant in the country, located in Sanaa, was completed in 2000, but it had to be upgraded between 2003 and 2005 due to "deficiencies in its operation, unacceptable odor emissions, and inadequate management of the generated sludge". While data on the quality of treated effluent are limited, available data showed that the effluent of at least two plants complied with the relatively lenient national standard of 150 mg/L of Biological oxygen demand, a measure of organic pollution. However, none of the four analyzed plants complied with the standard for fecal coliform, a measure of biological contamination. Reuse of treated and untreated wastewater in agriculture is common in Yemen. Furthermore, hazardous wastewater from hospitals and medical laboratories is discharged into the sewer system, but cannot be adequately treated in the existing municipal wastewater treatment plants.

==== Conflict-era operational status (2015–present) ====
After years of armed conflict, military damage in some places, and fuel blockades, the structural integrity of Yemen's wastewater sector severely collapsed. Extended central electrical grid failures and high diesel costs routinely forced total operational shutdowns of critical plants, including the Sanaa facility. The resulting overflow of raw, untreated sewage into public spaces and agricultural valleys directly increased historic outbreaks of waterborne diseases, and even triggering a severe national cholera epidemic.

To prevent total collapse of the infrastructures, humanitarian interventions led by agencies such as the World Bank and UNOPS have started shifting several remaining installations—such as the Zabid and Aden infrastructure toward decentralized solar-diesel hybrid networks to maintain minimal operational safety standards.

== Water resources ==
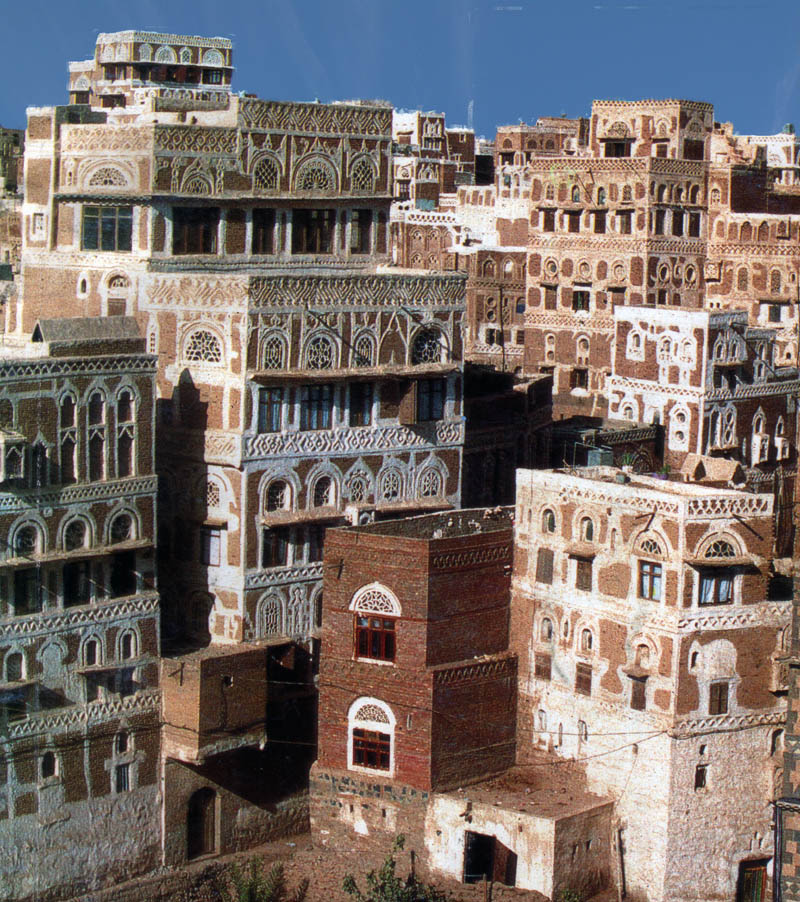
Sanaa, the capital of the Republic of Yemen, is supplied entirely by groundwater, with water levels declining by 6–8 m per year

With renewable water resources of only 80 cubic meters per capita/year Yemen is one of the most water-scarce countries in the world. This level is far below the threshold for water stress, which is defined at 1,700 cubic meters per capita/year. Water demand continues to dramatically exceed the renewable resources, thus leading to a steady decline in groundwater levels, varying between 1 m per year in the Tuban-Abyan area and 6–8 m per year in the Sanaa basin. Today, there are between 45,000 and 70,000 unregulated wells in Yemen, the majority are under private control, most of which were drilled without license. Agriculture takes the main share of Yemen's water resources, using nearly 84 percent, and it is estimated that khat production accounts for 30 percent of all water used in irrigation.

Furthermore, climate change has significantly increased rainfall variability and accelerated extreme weather patterns across Yemen. For example, in Sanaa the average rainfall declined by one sixth from 240mm (average 1932–1968) to 200mm (1969–1982) and 180mm (1983–2000). Current global climate models indicate a shift to more intense, unpredictable rain events. This climate fragility is characterized by longer, hotter dry periods alternating with destructive flash floods, which might harm local traditional water infrastructure rather than filling the country's depleted aquifers.

=== Sanaa ===
Sanaa could be the first capital city in the world to run dry. Since the 2000s, many wells had to be drilled to depths of 2,600 to 3,900 feet (790 to 1,190 m), which is extremely deep by world standards. While the combined output of the 125 wells operated by the state-owned Sanaa Local Corporation for Water Supply and Sanitation historically barely met 35 percent of the growing city's need, protracted conflict, grid failures, and fuel shortages have severely harmed public infrastructure. Consequently, the vast majority of the population relies entirely on expensive, unregulated private networks and mobile water tankers. To combat deteriorating groundwater quality, privately owned kiosks that use reverse osmosis to purify poor-quality groundwater supplies mushroomed in Sanaa and other towns. Long-term technical proposals, such as pumping desalinated water from the Red Sea across 155 miles (249 km), over 9,000-foot (2,700 m) mountains into the capital, itself located at an altitude of 7,226 feet (2,202 m). The enormous pumping cost would push the price of water up to $10 per cubic meter.

The Minister for Water and the Environment, Abdulrahman al-Eryani, said in 2007:

The Sana'a basin is using water 10 times faster than Nature is replenishing it. And before long there won’t even be enough to drink. I am not an optimist. I think many of the city's people will simply have to move away. The solution I am proposing is a very clear policy—a voluntary one—of reallocating people from here down to the Red Sea coast. We could use renewable energy there to desalinate sea water. And it would be cheaper than trying to provide enough water to Sana'a. This is not the first time that Yemenis have had to move to avoid disaster. It's happened many times in the last few thousand years, when Nature allowed the population to increase rapidly. This time, though, there are political frontiers in the way of an exodus.

=== Other localities ===
"Along the coast between Mukalla and Aden a number of fishing villages are supplied by water within a half mile of the shore. The water levels are a few feet above mean sea level and probably represent wedges of freshwater floating on sea water (Ghyben–Herzberg principle). The freshwater probably originated from the higher ground behind the coastal plains by slow seaward movement, and partly from natural precipitation."

In the Tuban Delta and the temporary capital of Aden, aquifers near the coasts are approaching exhaustion, with electrical conductivity and salinity levels in municipal wellfields (such as Bir Nasser and Bir Ahmed) already exceeding national drinking water standards. To prevent total collapse, international development agencies have started feasibility studies to transition Aden toward solar-powered seawater desalination.

The city of Taiz suffers from one of the most severe water crises in the country. Widespread damage to public infrastructure, and the destruction of critical municipal wellfields due to armed conflict, forced the complete shutdown of the public water network. Residents are almost entirely dependent on local initiatives, such as: expensive private water trucking, and a single over-extracted valley water source (Al-Dhabab), which covers only a small fraction of the city's total demand.

Groundwater near the city of Ibb is polluted by leachate from a landfill, while water fields in other low-lying peri-urban areas face a lot of biological and chemical contamination from the unregulated disposal of untreated industrial and domestic wastewater.

== History and recent events ==
=== Sector reforms (1995–2008) ===
The Yemeni water and sanitation sector underwent important changes between 1995 and 2008, with most significant changes occurred between 2000 and 2003. Decentralization, commercialization and community participation were key principles of these reforms. In 2003 the Ministry of Water and Environment (MWE) was established, to take responsibility for water supply and sanitation from the former Ministry of Energy and Water (MEW). This was seen a sign of political commitment to tackle the challenges Yemen faces in the water sector. In 2005 the government adopted the National Water Sector Strategy and Investment Program, to increase cooperation between the Ministries of Water and Agriculture, as well as between donors. Through the process of joint annual reviews these ministries, their agencies and donors evaluate progress. The changes affect urban water supply and sanitation, rural water supply and sanitation, as well as water resources management.

Despite institutional challenges, achievements were made in the sector around the turn of the millennium. Wide-ranging reforms were carried out, which were supported by substantial international donor funding. These reforms decentralized urban service provision to commercially managed local corporations. The utilities substantially increased tariffs to improve cost recovery margines. While the service rates rose, water remains affordable with a minor increase of water and sewerage fees, respresenting about 1.1% of total household expenditures. By comparison, the average monthly spending on the widely used stimulant qat is about eight times time higher than the combined water and sewer bill. Between 1995 and 2008, about 2.8 million Yemenis gained access to improved water source and approximately 7.5 million to improved sanitation. In a survey carried out in 2008 across seven towns, 89% of the customers of water utilities reported satisfaction with the service delivery, and only 9% were dissatisfied. In Sanaa, the collection efficiency of water and sewer bills increased from 60% to 97% during the same period. However, it declined back to 60% in 2011, due to national political instability.

==== Urban water supply and sanitation ====
Until 2000, urban water and sewer services were managed by a national public enterprise called the National Water and Sanitation Authority (NWSA). Institutional studies of the reform period identified significant systemic inefficiencies within this model: tariffs were set by the national government at levels insufficient to meet cost recovery; revenues were centrally controlled, limiting local autonomy; and civil service salaries were inadequate to retain skilled staff. Furthermore, local branches were lacked the independence to hire and fire staff; budgets allocated to branches were inadequate; and centralized procedures and management systems did not run local branches in a cost-efficient manner.

A 1995–1996 study funded by the World Bank, led by John Kalbermatten, became the blueprint of the sectoral reform. The study recommended to decentralizing, corporatizing and commercializing urban water and sanitation services, and to replace them with local corporations, proposing that replace the National Water and Sanitation Authority (NWSA) in service provision. Additionally, recommendations were made for the private sector to take a major role in service provision and to establish an autonomous regulatory agency. These recommendations were formally adopted as national policy in 1997.

A small NWSA branch in Rada'a town, located in the Al-Bayda' Governorate was selected as a pilot project to test the proposed reform. The principles governing this pilot, which referred to as the "Rada’a Model," included the following mandates:

- The Branch operates independently of NWSA Head Office, while remaining accountable to NWSA for regulatory matters, and to the Minister of Electricity and Water for policy issues.
- The Branch is accountable to the local community through a Local Advisory Committee, which monitors and reviews the Branch's activities.
- The Branch manages its own tariffs and billing system, retaining revenues in local bank accounts, while contributing an overhead fee for regulatory services.
- The Branch appoints the local staff, with exception of three key management positions, which are appointed by a Ministerial resolution on agreed criteria.
- The Branch incentivizes employees based on performance, to supplement staff remuneration according to civil service pay scales.
- The Branch is required to submit monthly operational reports, as well as quarterly and annual financial statements.
- The Branch's accounts are subject to independent audits.

Following the passage of Local Administration Law No. 4 in 2000, the Yemeni government initiated the decentralization of urban water services. The first local corporation was established in the Sanaa region in February 2000, followed by Aden in the same year. Five more local corporations were established in 2001: Taiz, Hodeida, Ibb, Wadi Hadramaut and Mukalla. Local corporations in Hajjah and Al-Bayda' were established in 2005, and in 2006 they started operating in Sadah, Abyan, Lahj and Dhamar. Two more corporations were established in 2008 Amran and Ad Dali'. As of 2009, more than 95% of the urban areas were served by 15 local corporations. In 2003, the newly formed MWE introduced the Performance Indicators Information System (PIIS), to monitor and evaluate the service providers performance at local and national levels. Although the study was completed in 2006, based on which a legislative proposal was prepared to establish an autonomous regulatory agency, the initiative remained pending implementation. Since the escalation of the conflict in 2015, the operational autonomy and financial solvency of these corporations have been severely damaged, with many relying on humanitarian emergency support and not on independent utility management.

According to the Yemen Observer, "the process of decentralization was not smooth; it faced strong resistance from the central organization. Sustainable political will and endorsement of the local administration law helped to overcome these obstacles".

Despite the decentralization efforts, the operational autonomy of local corporations remained limited. Major decisions -including the approval of service rates, capital investments, and the selection of local senior management continued to require central government authorization. Furthermore, international development funding was channeled through the central government. Governance challenges were also documented; Boards of Directors in local corporations often failed to meet their targets. In the case of the Ibb local corporation, the Board which met infrequently did not discuss the corporation's accounts and remained reluctant to address necessary tariff adjustments. Although a 2009 study recommended transitioning local corporations into public companies with more independent business plans, these reforms were not implemented.

Following the escalation of conflict in 2015, the operational autonomy and financial solvency of local water and sanitation corporations collapsed, reversing many of the reforns made during the previous decade. By 2017, urban water service coverage dropped from a pre-crisis level of 68% to 59%, and the reliability of service delivery in many cities fell below 25%. As a result, households have become increasingly dependent on expensive and unregulated private water trucking—with costs in cities like Aden and Taiz reaching nearly ten times higher than the rates seen in the capital. In response, international organizations, led by the World Bank and some UN agencies, have pivoted from long-term institutional reform to the Yemen Integrated Urban Services Emergency Project (YIUSEP). This initiative prioritizes the restoration of critical infrastructure, such as solar-powered pumping systems and water treatment plant rehabilitation, to maintain essential services in the absence of a functional national utility grid.

==== Rural water supply and sanitation ====
Regarding rural water supply and sanitation, the government formalized a policy (Decree #21 of November 22, 2000), which emphasized the principles of demand-responsiveness, decentralized community-based management and cost recovery. At that time, the General Authority for Rural Electricity and Water (GAREW) was responsible for overseeing rural water supply and electrification infrastructure. In 2003 GAREW became a separate sector, leading to the creation of the General Authority for Rural Water Supply Projects (GARWSP), responsible specifically for water and sanitation. While GARWSP remains the formal government authority, its capacity has been reduced massively since the escalation of conflict in 2015. The authority is currently fragmented between several administrative entities in Aden and Sanaa. In practice, the rural service delivery has moved from centralized state management to localized, community-managed systems and international humanitarian aid interventions.

==== Water resources management: 2002 water law ====
Law No. 33 of 2002 which deals with water resources management passed in July 2002. While the legislation did not oversight drinking water supply and sanitation, it provided a framework to preserve water resources that are essential for the sustainability of water services. An Arabic copy is available on the Yemeni Public Prosecutor's website, together with a copy of the Environment Law No. 26 of 1995. The context of the water law is described as follows:

“Historically, management of water resources in the Republic of Yemen has been inadequate, with some of the key problems being: water and property rights are not clearly defined; the problems of groundwater mining have led to abstraction rates that exceed recharge by about 80% on average, and in some places abstraction exceeds recharge by 400%; charges for water use are low, or non-existent; water usage is distributed 93% for irrigation purposes, 5% for domestic use, and 2% for industry, and political and economic upheaval over the past decade has resulted in limited institutional capacity, particularly to bring water demand in line with availability. As a major step forward in the process of securing improved water resources management, the Government of the Republic of Yemen has prepared a Water Law, which was ratified by the House of Representatives in July 2002.”

=== National water conservation campaign (2008) ===
In 2008, the National Water Resources Authority (NWRA) launched a national water conservation campaign in partnership with the German development organisation GIZ (formerly GTZ) and the United Nations Development Programme (UNDP). The campaign featured a raindrop-shaped cartoon character named Rowyan (رويان), which derived from the Arabic word meaning "quenched" or "well-watered."

=== Impact of the crisis since 2009 ===
The security situation in Yemen began to deteriorate in 2009, resulting in heavy fighting in many parts of the country and a change of government in 2011. The fighting forced tens of thousands of people to flee their homes, such as the mass displacement from Abyan to Lahej, necessitating emergency drinking water interventions by the international community. Urban water supply throughout the country often collapsed due to frequent power grid interruptions, critical shortages of diesel fuel, and insufficient backup generation capacity. Furthermore, a decline in revenue, exacerbated by consumer inability to pay fees, left the corporates in financial crisis. By January 2012, the Minister of Water and Environment - Abdulsalam Razaz, reported that it owed over YR 33 billion (US$153 million) "by government bodies and people of power”, warning that it was on the verge of bankruptcy. Additionally, strikes created chaos in the Ministry and its branches. These initial challenges were the beginning of more severe humanitarian crisis that followed the 2015 escalation of the civil war.

In 2010, the General Rural Water Authority (GRWA) commissioned an assessment of existing rural water coverage. The study recommended focusing on rainwater harvesting in Yemen's highlands, and on well drilling in coastal and desert regions. However, the political instability prevented the implementation of these recommendations. According to international aid organizations, the government of President Abd Rabbuh Mansur Hadi did not prioritize resolving the water crisis.

=== Civil War ===
Water conditions in Yemen have deteriorated significantly since the beginning of the civil war in 2015. The blockade has prevented the importation of fuel necessary for operating groundwater pump. By the mid-2020s, an estimated 20 million people were in need of water, sanitation and hygiene - a 52% increase since before the beginning of the Saudi Arabian-led intervention in Yemen. Increased water rates forced some families to spend a third of their income on water. Since the water infrustructures have been severely damaged by the bombing, Yemenis have resorted to collecting water in containcers, which has led to the spread of diseases such as dengue, malaria and cholera.

Reports have also indicated that critical Yemeni infrastructure, health, water and sanitation systems and facilities, including desalination plants and municipal pipelines, have been severely damages by Saudi-led coalition air strikes.

The water crisis in Yemen has become a catastrophic situation characterized by the evolving of a structural water scarcity, climate-related events, and the long-term degradation of critical infrastructure because of the on-going war. By 2026, an estimated 17.4 million people in Yemen lacked access to adequate sanitation and hygiene services, while approximately 15 million people faced severe water insecurity.

The country's water vulnerability is caused by the imbalance between supply and demand. Yemen relies on irregular rainfall and rapidly depleting groundwater reserves, with extraction rates in basins like Sanaa often doubling the natural refilling capacity. This structural scarcity has been severely increased by over a decade of conflict; the destruction of pumping stations, water treatment plants, and distribution networks has crippled the municipal water supply. Furthermore, the collapse of the power grid and critical shortages of fuel—necessary to operate groundwater pumps—have made the previously described water infrastructure largely non-functional in many districts.

In recent years, the situation has been further worsened by climate-related disasters, including strong floods that have damaged or destroyed water supply systems and contaminated existing sources, increasing the risk of waterborne disease outbreaks such as cholera, dengue, and malaria. With humanitarian operations facing significant funding shortfalls and restricted access, mainly in northern regions, millions of Yemenis remain dependent on unsustainable alternatives, such as collecting rainwater in open containers or purchasing expensive, potentially unsafe water from private tankers. As of 2026, the humanitarian community suggests that restoring long-term water security will require not only the rehabilitation of physical infrastructure but also sustainable, solar-powered solutions and progress toward a lasting political stability.

== Responsibility for water supply and sanitation ==
=== Policy and regulation ===
The Ministry of Water and Environment (MWE) is tasked with formulating national water policies in Yemen, while being supported by a Technical Secretariat (TS) for Water Sector Reform, and aimings to create an autonomous regulatory agency for the water and sanitation sector. However, the prolonged civil war has severely damaged the sector; central administration is split between competing authorities, making unified national oversight impossible. The TS for Water Sector Reform, which was previously a key driver of centralized institutional development, is barely operative, and the government's long-term vision of an autonomous regulatory agency remains pending.

The MWE oversees key subordinate agencies, including: The National Water Resources Authority (NWRA) for managing water resources, the National Water and Sewerage Authority (NWSA) for urban water supply, the General Authority for Rural Water Projects (GARWSP) for rural water services, and the Environment Protection Agency (EPA).

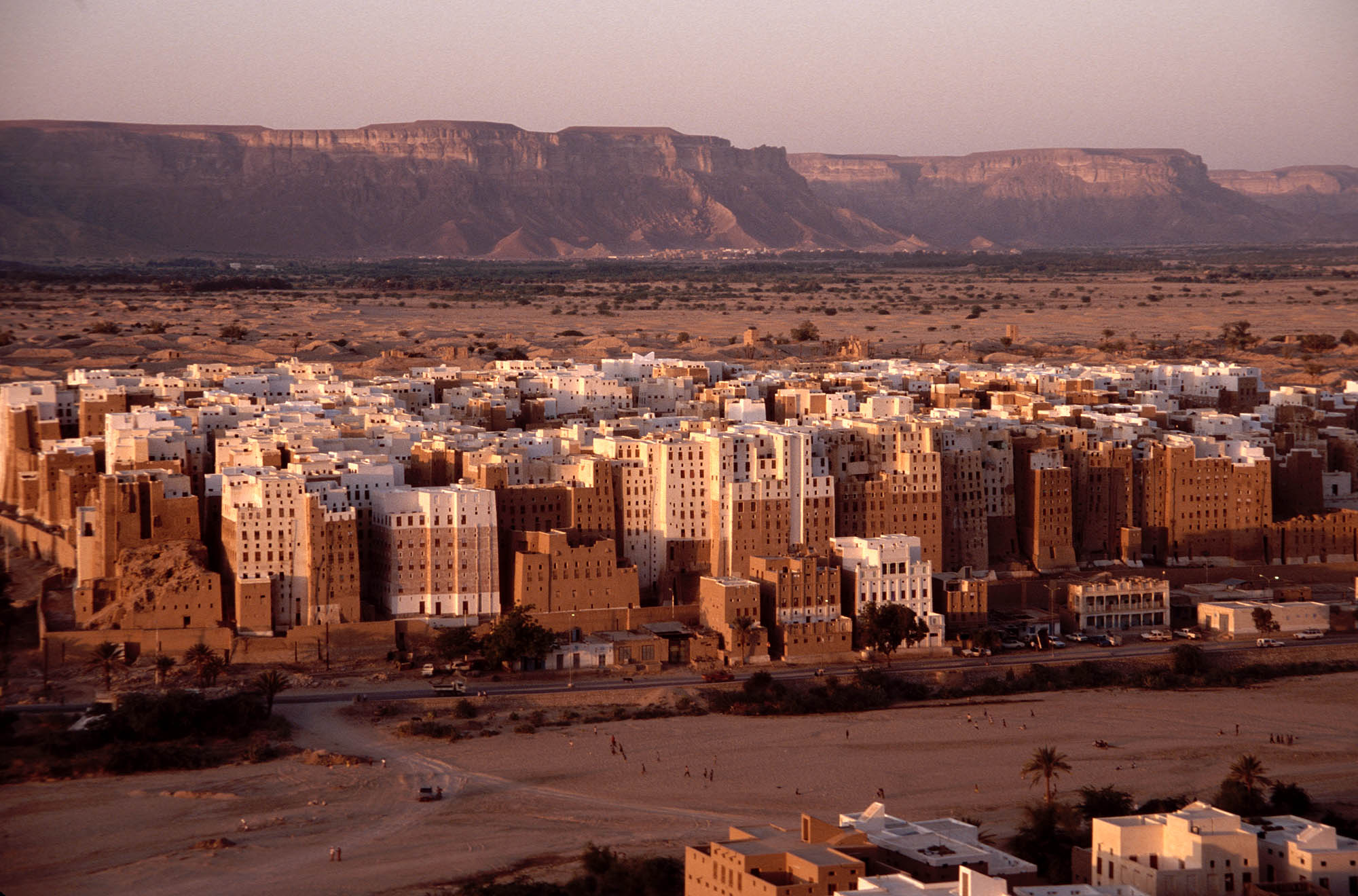
The National Water Resources Authority has set up a branch in Hadramaut, which includes the city of Shibam shown here

In practice, these agencies are hardly functional because of stuff displacement, lack of operational funding, and the loss of centralized control over local branches. As a result, the management of water services has largely decentralized, with local services heavily relying on international humanitarian aid and community-led solar-powered infrastructure interventions.

=== Service provision ===
==== Urban areas ====
Urban water supply and sanitation have historically been provided by decentralized public entities, including Local Corporations (LCs), and regional branches of the National Water and Sanitation Authority (NWSA). However, these municipal service providers have faced many operational disruptions and financial hardships because of conflict-related damage, power grid failures, and fuel shortages.

Local Water and Sanitation Corporations (LCs) were established to services the major urban centers including: Aden, Hodeidah, Ibb, Mukalla, Sanaa and Taizas well as 9 towns: Abyan, Amran, Al-Bayda', Ad Dali', Dhamar, Hajjah, Lahj, Sadah and Wadi Hadramaut. Historically they served the great majority of the urban population of Yemen. 15 of the 21 governorates of Yemen have a LC and the objective is to have one LC per governorate. However, the operational capacity of these corporations has been severely affected by conflict-related damage, fuel shortages, and financial hardships. Consequently, urban LCs now operate in reduced capacity and rely heavily on international humanitarian organizations for fuel subsidies, solarization projects, and operational support to maintain basic water supply and wastewater services.

Autonomous public utilities in smaller towns operated as decentralized units, affiliated to the LCs in their governorate or directly under the National Water and Sanitation Authority (NWSA). Acting as cost centers within the LC, the utilities, such as in Bait al-Faqih reports to the local corporation in Hodeidah LC, or the autonomous utility in Rada'a, where the reform process had been piloted, which reports to Al-Bayda' LC. In governorates with no established LC, such as Ataq, the capital of Shabwah Governorate, and in Al Mahwit the local utilities reprt to the NWSA. They were in an intermediate state before becoming independent LCs, however, the long conflict and institutional fragmentation have stopped the transition into fully autonomous LCs.

The local branches of NWSA include the smaller capital cities of governorates where there is neither a local corporation nor an autonomous utility yet. They include Ma'rib, Al Jawf and Al Mahrah as well as the newly established governorate Raymah. It is estimated that less than 5% of the urban population of Yemen live in the 16 local branches that remain with NWSA.

==== Rural areas ====
Historically, rural water services in Yemen were provided by thousands of community-based water committees, with technical support from the General Authority for Rural Water Projects (GARWSP). According to a 2000 World Bank report, at that time communities were inadequately involved in water system design and government and donor-supported schemes usually fell short of developing effective community construction and management mechanisms. Water committees were imposed local institutions, often suffering from internal management conflicts, leading to negligence of operation and maintenance which resulted in frequent break-downs. Over 50 percent of rural schemes were non-functional, due to high diesel pumping costs, poor technical design, and an inability to collect enough user fees to cover for maintenance and spare parts. In addition, political and tribal leaders frequently demanded that the government allocates its resources to particular projects, thereby interrupting—even abandoning—the work of started schemes. According to a 1996 Review, there were several hundreds of incomplete projects at that time. Little was done in the area of hygiene education, safe drinking water storage, and wastewater and excreta disposal.

Although a Demand-Responsive Approach (DRA) was introduced in the late 2000s to allow authorities to require upfront local co-financing—typically 5 to 30 percent of investment costs—and improve community ownership, implementation was uneven.

The escalation of armed conflict after 2015 severely damaged rural water services, as increasing fuel prices and broken distribution channels made the diesel-powered pumping not sustainable for most of the villages. To prevent nation-wide collapse of water supply to villages, international air organizations—including UNICEF, the World Bank, and UNDP—partnered with Yemeni authorities and Water User Associations (WUAs) to change the rural water systems to solar power. These local solarization projects have significantly lowered operating costs, and relying on imported diesel, and provided a reliable water service to millions in remote regions.

== Efficiency ==
In 2011, non-revenue water (NRW) - water lost through physical leaks, less consumption than expected, or illegal connections, was estimated to be 32% in Sanaa, 33% in Aden, 22% in Taiz and 35% in Mukalla, which demonstrated a modest improvement compared to previous levels. In 2001 NRW was estimated to be around 50 percent. According to the joint annual review of the water and sanitation sector for 2007, average NRW dropped to 28%. In Sanaa, NRW decreased from about 50% in 1999 to an estimated 38% in 2007. In the same year, among the larger utilities the best outcome was achieved in Ibb with 20%, and the worst in Hodeidah with 43%. The accuracy of the report is uncertain.

Following the civil war, physical destruction of municipal pipes, illegal water connections, and vast loss of measuring infrastructure inscreased the NRW levels in major citues to surge, and in many areas exceeding 50%.

Public water utilities have also historically experienced operational overstaffing, yet continued to recruit staff. In 2000, the average was 10 employees per 1,000 connections, which is double the standard efficiency benchmark of fewer than five per 1,000 connections. By 2007, the number of staff per 1,000 connections varied between 5 and 20 across different LC's. The conflict harmed the utility administration, which led to salary non-payment, staff relocation, and loss of technical capacity. The LC's because heavily dependent on external aid organizations for payroll support and basic maintenance.

== Financial aspects ==
Financial aspects of water and sanitation cover the financial sustainability of service providers as well as the affordability of services for households. Household payments for water include payments for water bought from private tanker trucks as well as the payment of bills for piped water. Due to the vast damage of municipal piped supply, household water expenditures in Yemen are now mainly characcterized by buying from unregulated private tanker trucks and other private vendors, often consuming a major share of household income.

=== Urban areas ===
Historically, cities water utilities used to recover operation and maintenance costs by setting municipal tariffs, as well as investments by government and international donors. However, in some cases, such as Sanaa, credits by international donors were on-lent to the utility. A few utilities have been able to recover full service cost, such as the small town Bait al-Faqih, which had a new system and low losses, indicating a functional and efficient network, and no inherited staff and thus no overstaffing. Collection efficiency - the proportion of billed tariffs actually collected, increased from 60% in 1999 to 97% in 2007, until it dropped again in 2011 to about 60%.

Municipal water tariffs in Yemen are differentiating between domestic users who pay the least, and commercial users as well as government entities which pay higher rates. All utilities used increasing-block tariffs, with the lowest block covering a consumption between 5 and 10 cubic meters per month and connection.

The government raised tariffs in 1995, 1998, 1999 and 2001. Further increases have been undertaken subsequently by local corporations. From 1995 to 2001 the monthly bill increased over 350% for a domestic customer consuming 15 m^{3}/month, while the industrial tariff increased over 150 percent per m3.

Following the escalation of the civil war and state institutional collapse, the municipal cost-recovery systems stopped functioning. Public water corporations revenues collapse partly due to vast bill non-payment, leaving local utilities unable to cover operational costs or staff salaries without direct subsidies, fuel deliveries, and solarization support from international aid organizations.

Prior to the war, the public piped water was relatively affordable, and was about 1.1% of average monthly household expenditure and sewer was even lower. However, the physical destruction of piped infrastructure and power grid failures forced the majority of the population to rely on unregulated private tanker trucks and commercial well operators. Private water tariffs are much higher due to inflated diesel costs for pumping and transport. Consequently, private water purchases now consume up to a third of household income for many Yemeni families.

According to the World Bank, cost of water supplied by tankers in Sanaa was seven times the price of municipal rate, while in Aden untreated tank water reached 25 times higher or US$7.30 per cubic meter, and desalinated water costs as much as US$20 per cubic meter.

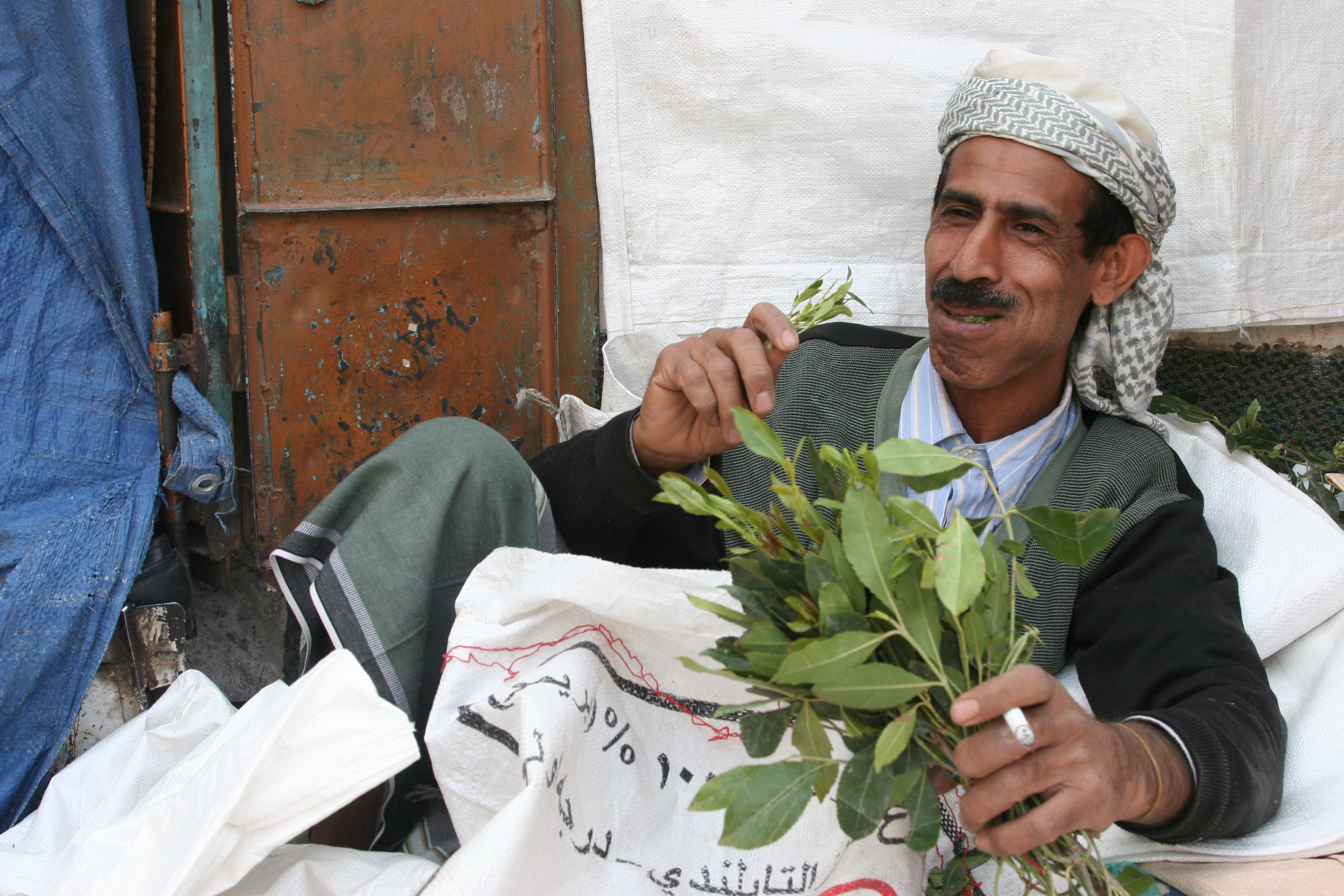
Yemeni man chewing khat

=== Rural areas ===
By 2000 the majority of rural water systems used some form of cost-recovery, relying either on metered water use, or a flat rate fees. Later on, cost recovery in villages deteriorated significantly because of high fuel costs for diesel-powered pumping, pure maintenance, and economic hardship, leaving many local water committees unable to get water without external aid.

== External cooperation ==
Prior to the 2015 civil war, the assistance for Yemen's water and sanitation sector was mainly long-term development programs, which were funded by international donors, including the World Bank, International Committee of the Red Cross (ICRC), the Arab Fund for Economic and Social Development, Islamic Development Bank, the German Development Bank KfW, the German Technical Cooperation agency GIZ, the Netherlands, Japan, United Kingdom, DFID, and the European Union. Following the outbreak of the war and the collapse of state infrastructure and utilities, the international support changed into emergency, humanitarian assistance and crisis aid, with specialized aid agencies such as: UNICEF, UNOPS, and the ICRC providing maintenance of basic water, sanitation, and hygiene (WASH) services.

=== UNICEF ===
As the most important organization of the Water, Sanitation, and Hygiene (WASH) cluster in Yemen, UNICEF and its local partners provide emergency water through trucks, water points and communal water tanks to internally displaced people, emergency latrines and hygiene kits that include chlorine tablets for water purification. In urban areas, they provide fuel subsidies, spare parts and water purification chemicals such as chlorine, to provide water and prevent the total collapse of local services. They also help maintain sewage systems. In partnership with the General Authority for Rural Water Projects (GARWSP), UNICEF has installed multiple rural solar-powered water schemes, to ensure sustainable, low-cost operations. Hundreds of Rapid Response Teams, supported by UNICEF, intervened in most of Yemen districts to control suspected cholera outbreaks, by desludging and fixing damaged water and sewage pipes. These actions have significantly reduced the cholera cases in the affected districts.

=== United Nations Agencies ===
In addition to UNICEF's role as WASH cluster lead, other UN agencies manage major infrastructure and water security programs:

==== UNOPS ====
Executes large-scale fixing of municipal infrastructure, including providing equipment for urban public water wells, health centers, and wastewater facilities with solar systems.

==== UNDP ====
Leads long-term climate resilience, groundwater monitoring, and agricultural water projects, including the World Bank-backed Improved Water Management and Irrigation for Sustainability and Efficiency (I-WISE) project implemented jointly with UNOPS.

=== World Bank ===
In 2002, it approved the US$150 million Urban Water Supply and Sanitation Program, to fix broken infrastructure, strengthen the administrative capacity of Local Corporations (LCs), and establish a regulatory framework for the urban water and sanitation sector in Yemen. In rural areas, the Water Supply and Sanitation Project—with US$20 million approved in December 2000 with additional financing of US$20 million approved in January 2008—expanded sustainable rural water supply and sanitation service coverage to mostly poor rural dwellers in ten governorates. Until 2007, 140 water sub-projects serving more than 320,000 people were completed. In addition, three consecutive Social fund for Development Projects financed partly by the World Bank allocated an estimated 15% for rural water supply and sanitation.

Since the beginning of the civil war in 2015, the World Bank started supporting emergency grant financing, managed by international and local partners, including UNICEF, UNOPS, and the Social Fund for Development (SFD). Importand crisis-era initiatives, like the Yemen Emergency Health and Nutrition Project (EHNP) and the Emergency Urban Services Project, have focused on installing public pumping wells powered by solar energy, fixing damaged municipal sewage networks, providing operational support to urban utilities, and maintaining emergency WASH infrastructure.

=== International Committee of the Red Cross (ICRC) ===
Provides engineering support to Local Water Corporations (LCs), supplying water-treatment chemicals, heavy machinery for sewage maintenance, and direct repairs to damaged pipeline infrastructures.

=== Arab Fund for Economic and Social Development (AFESD) ===
Before the civil war, the Arab Fund for Economic and Social Development (AFESD), financed several large municipal water and sanitation projects in Yemen, by providing soft loans and grants. Examples are: the construction of the Sanaa wastewater treatment plant ($30 million loan); the construction of wastewater networks in Sanaa (first and second phase, with two loans of around $100 million); the expansion of the Sanaa wastewater treatment plant; the upgrade of water and sanitation facilities in Aden (with a loan of around US$35 million); the construction of wastewater facilities in Seiyun and Tarim (with a loan of around US$50 million); and the Sanaa Flood protection project (with a loan of around US$25 million). In November 2012, Arab Fund signed an agreement to finance the fourth phase of Sanaa wastewater networks with a loan of about US$54 million. The construction were planned to be completed before the end of 2017. In 2014, the Arab Fund signed an agreement to finance additional works in Sanaa flood protection, with a loan of around US$35 million. In addition, AFESD provided several grants for the water and sanitation sector in Yemen. Examples are preparing wastewater study for old Sanaa city, construction of a septage disposal facility in Sanaa.

Because of civil war in 2015, the implementation of major AFESD-funded projects stopped due to the suspension of development loans, the ongoing military operations, and many institutional disruptions of public utilities.

=== Islamic Development Bank ===
Financed pre-war water infrastructure projects in cities and water resources management initiatives.

=== European Union ===
Before the 2015 war, the European Union (EU) financed sector development programs related to institutional reform, expansion of urban sanitation, and development of rural community water systems. Following the 2015 escalation, EU support through the European Civil Protection and Humanitarian Aid Operations (ECHO) changed to emergency relief funding, supporting solar-powered water networks, water-trucks, hygiene promotion, and cholera outbreak preventions.

=== Germany ===
Germany has played an important role in the implementation of urban water and sanitation reforms in Yemen since the mid-1990s, including through the support provided by the German Agency for International Cooperation (GIZ, formerly GTZ) to the technical secretariat in the Ministry in charge of the sector. GIZ supports the water and sanitation sector through a €23 million program for the Institutional Development of the Water Sector from 1994 to 2009. The program supports the decentralization reforms, strengthens local corporations, and establishes water basin committees and water resources management plans through training provided by NWSA and NWRA.

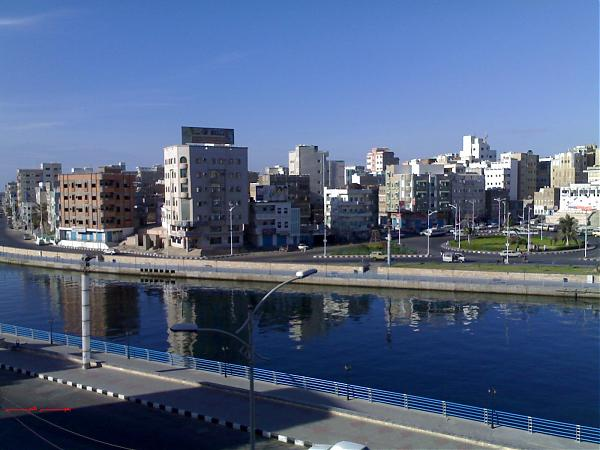
In Mukalla on the Indian Ocean network losses in part of the city were reduced after rehabilitation measures financed by German development cooperation.

On behalf of the German government, the KfW development bank has financed water and sanitation investments in the city of Aden and several smaller towns such as: Al Shehr/Al Hami in Mukalla District, Mokha, Yarim, Amran, Sa'dah, Zabid, Bajil, Mansouria and four municipalities in the Al Hudaydah Governorate (Zabid, Bajil, Al Mansouria, and Bait al-Faqih). An early evaluation of KfW-supported municipal projects across eight provincial towns in Yemen (Bajil, Bait al-Faqih, Al Mansouria, Zabid, Mokha, Amran, Yarim und Hajjah), and sanitation measures across three towns (Hajjah, Amran and Yarim) indicated that water supply targets were largely met with high construction quality, however, sanitation improvements remained more limited. In an evaluation of KfW-supported projects in several towns, the quality of the construction work was rated as high and the collection of bills was considered to be "efficient". However, in Yarim the objectives did not meet the KPIs due to water shortages, and only "modest improvements" were achieved regarding waste water disposal. A separate water loss reduction project in Taiz and Mukalla received mixed results: while water losses in the rehabilitated areas were reduced significantly, (for example in Mukalla, where 40% of the network was rehabilitated, loses were reduced from 22% to 8%, and in Taiz, where only 12% of the network was rehabilitated, loses fell from 45% to 6%), overall losses in the cities remained high - predominantly 30% in Mukalla and 47% in Taiz, as large sections of the municipal network was not fixed. The cost of the work exceeded the initial budget, due to the poorer than expected conditions of the network. To accurately assess the health impact of the interventions it supported in Yemeni towns, KfW initiated a process of applying robust, quantitative-based evaluation methods through surveys including both beneficiaries and a control group.

Following the escalation of civik war in 2015, German technical cooperation shifted from long-term institutional development to emergency services and service preservation. GIZ did massive damage assessments of municipal water corporations, provided direct technical assistance, and supported emergency infrastructure fixings to maintain basic water supply and sanitation services.

=== Netherlands ===
The Netherlands maintained a long-standing development partnership in Yemen's Water Sector since 1978 until the end of the bilateral aid following the outbreak of civil war. Considerable amounts of funds have been used for urban and rural infrastructure projects in water and sanitation, irrigation, water resources assessment and management, as well as development and organisational and institutional strengthening and Water Sector Reform.

Until the late nineties the assistance focused mainly on specific infrastructure projects, it slowly transitioned to a program approach, allocating between 2006 and 2009, around €5 million annually, mainly to rural water supply and water resources management.

In February 2006, the Netherlands Minister for Development Cooperation at the time, the Taiz Water Supply and Sanitation Local Corporation, and Dutch water utility Vitens N.V. established a €1.5 million, three-year public-private partnership (PPP) to upgrade operational management and municipal water and sanitation service delivery in Taiz.

=== United Kingdom ===
The UK Foreign, Commonwealth & Development Office (FCDO, formerly DFID) donated for rural WASH programs. Key pre-war programs supported decentralization reforms and community-managed rainwater collecting systems through the Social Fund for Development (SFD). After 2015, British funding transitioned to emergency humanitarian grants, water trucks for internally displaced persons, and public utility fuel relief delivered by several agencies.

=== Japan ===
Japan International Cooperation Agency (JICA) has focused its assistance on rural water supply projects, funding the construction and rehabilitation of water supply infrastructure in 20 remote villages across five governorates, including Sanaa, Ibb and Taiz.

== See also ==
- Hot stain
- Peak water
- Water crisis

== Bibliography ==
- Greenwood, J.E.G.W. and D. Bleackley. 1967. “Geology of the Arabian Peninsula- Aden Protectorate.” Washington, DC: US Geological Survey Professional Paper 560-C.
- Hadden, Robert Lee. 2012. The Geology of Yemen: An Annotated Bibliography of Yemen's Geology, Geography and Earth Science. Alexandria, VA: US Army Corps of Engineers, Army Geospatial Center.
- Richards, Tony. 2002. “Assessment of Yemen Water Law: Final Report.” Prepared for: Deutsche Gesellschaft fuer Technische Zusammenarbeit (GTZ) GmbH. Page 1.
- Mark Zeitoun, Tony Allan, Nasser Al Aulaqi, Amer Jabarin and Hammou Laamrani:Water demand management in Yemen and Jordan: addressing power and interests, The Geographical Journal, Vol. 178, No. 1, March 2012, pp. 54–66.
