= Satellite gravimetry =

Study of Earth's gravity

Satellite gravimetry is the study of Earth's gravity field using satellites. It focuses on how changes in the distribution of snow, ice, and the Earth's crust affect Earth's gravitational field. It takes advantage of how gravity always keeps satellites in orbit. According to Newton's law of gravitation, the gravitational field between two objects has a linear relationship with the product of their masses and an inverse relationship with the square of the distance between them. Satellite gravity uses terrestrial, airborne, shipborne, and satellite sensors.

== History ==
Since the beginning of the space age in 1957, satellite geodesy, a new area of geodesy, was created. At that time, the goal of satellite gravity was to obtain detailed insights about Earth's gravity field. At that time, Sputnik-1 was put into orbit by the Soviet Union on October 4, 1957. Later that same year, on November 3, Sputnik-2 was also put into orbit. Since the start of several satellite gravity missions, more data is being gathered about the Earth's gravity field.

Events recorded
Event	Recorded by	Reference(s)
2016 earthquake in Papua New Guinea	GRACE	
2017 earthquake in Papua New Guinea	GRACE	
2019 earthquake in Peru	GRACE	

== Earth's gravitational field ==
Earth's gravitational field reflects its surface mass redistribution and its inner structure.

== Satellite orbit ==
If a satellite passes above a mass inhomogeneity or anomaly, its orbit will be perturbed, such as increasing or decreasing its distance from the Earth. The closer a satellite is to the Earth, the more sensitive it is to the gravity of the object below it.

The satellite motion and orbit statistics are observed to generate insights about the forces acting on the satellite.

== Research ==
Researchers typically use data from satellites that:

- orbit as low as possible (usually 200 – 500 km from the ground)
- uninterrupted orbit
- separation of gravitational and non-gravitational forces

=== Observations ===
The main observation principles are satellite-to-satellite tracking in two modes:

==== High-low mode ====
In satellite-to-satellite tracking in the high-low mode (SST-HL), a satellite that orbits Earth from a lower altitude is tracked by other satellites from above. The lower satellite is a probe within Earth's gravity field. Observed tridimensional accelerations are associated with gravitational accelerations. Non-gravitational forces acting on the satellite are measured using accelerometers.

==== Low-low mode ====
In satellite-to-satellite tracking in the low-low mode (SST-LL), two satellites are placed in the same orbit with a large distance between them. The difference in acceleration of both satellites is precisely measured. Changes in the gravity field of either satellite affecting the distance between both satellites is also considered.

=== Atmospheric impacts ===
A certain portion of the time-variable gravity signal received by a satellite is caused by atmospheric mass variability. To minimize temporal aliasing, the trihourly non-tidal atmosphere gravity field is subtracted from the gravitational value reported by the satellite.

== Accuracy ==
While satellite gravity gradient data is very precise in determining the short-wavelength part of the static gravity field model, it is highly inaccurate in measuring the long-wavelength part. Data collected from ground-level also tends to be more accurate than from satellites in geophysical explorations due to their proximity to the Earth.

== Geophysics ==
The gravitational models from satellite gravity are important in many geoscience applications such as geophysics, hydrology, and glaciology.

=== Earthquakes ===
GRACE satellite gravity missions reported volumetric disturbance of rocks for most shallow earthquakes with a moment magnitude greater than 8.0.
