= GRACE and GRACE-FO =

Joint American-German space mission to map Earth's gravitational field

GRACE
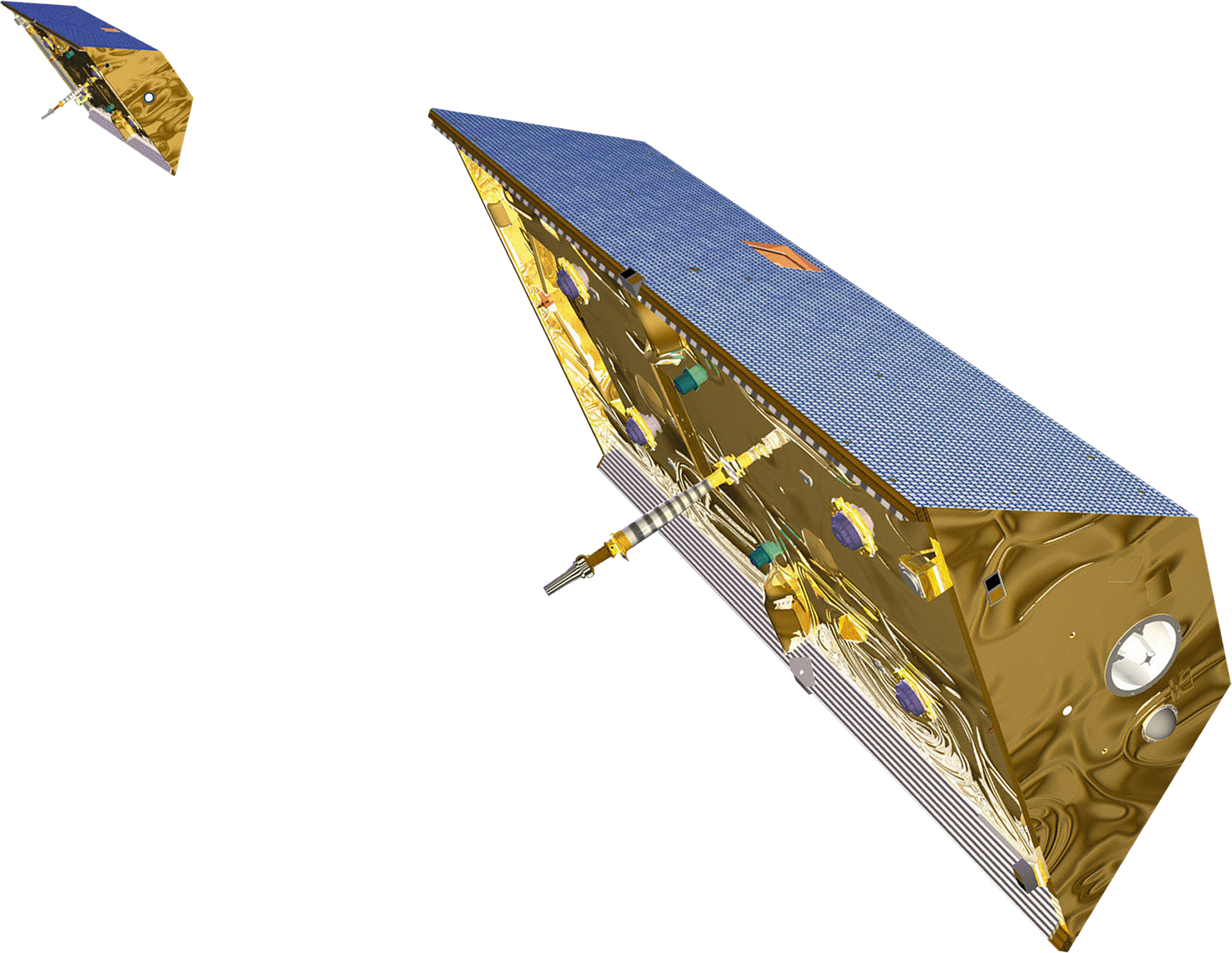
- Illustration of the twin GRACE satellites
- Names: GRACE-1 and GRACE-2; Tom and Jerry; ESSP-2A and ESSP-2B
- Mission type: Gravitational science
- Operator: NASA · DLR
- COSPAR ID: 2002-012A; 2002-012B
- SATCAT no.: 27391 and 27392
- Website: www.csr.utexas.edu/grace
- Mission duration: Planned: 5 years Final: 15 years, 7 months, 9 days

Spacecraft properties
- Bus: Flexbus
- Manufacturer: Astrium
- Launch mass: 487 kg (1,074 lb) each
- Dimensions: 1.942 × 3.123 × 0.72 m (6.4 × 10.2 × 2.4 ft)

Start of mission
- Launch date: 17 March 2002, 09:21 UTC
- Rocket: Rokot-KM #2
- Launch site: Plesetsk LC-133/3
- Contractor: Eurockot

End of mission
- Declared: 27 October 2017
- Decay date: GRACE-1: 10 March 2018, 06:09 UTC; 45.9°S 20.4°E; GRACE-2: 24 December 2017, 00:16 UTC; 63.9°N 160.9°W

Orbital parameters
- Reference system: Geocentric
- Semi-major axis: 6,873.5 km (4,271.0 mi)
- Eccentricity: 0.00182
- Perigee altitude: 483 km (300 mi)
- Apogee altitude: 508 km (316 mi)
- Inclination: 89.0°
- Period: 94.5 minutes
- Epoch: 17 March 2002, 04:21 UTC

The Gravity Recovery and Climate Experiment (GRACE) was a joint mission of NASA and the German Aerospace Center (DLR). Twin satellites took detailed measurements of Earth's gravity field anomalies from its launch in March 2002 to the end of its science mission in October 2017. The two satellites were sometimes called Tom and Jerry, a nod to the famous cartoon. The GRACE Follow-On (GRACE-FO) is a continuation of the mission on near-identical hardware, launched in May 2018. On March 19, 2024, NASA announced that the successor to GRACE-FO would be GRACE-Continuity (GRACE-C), to be launched in December 2028.

By measuring gravity anomalies, GRACE showed how mass is distributed around the planet and how it varies over time. Data from the GRACE satellites is an important tool for studying Earth's ocean, geology, and climate. GRACE was a collaborative endeavor involving the Center for Space Research at the University of Texas at Austin, NASA's Jet Propulsion Laboratory, the German Aerospace Center and Germany's National Research Center for Geosciences, Potsdam. The Jet Propulsion Laboratory was responsible for the overall mission management under the NASA ESSP (Earth System Science Pathfinder) program.

The principal investigator was Byron Tapley of the University of Texas Center for Space Research, and the co-principal investigator is Christoph Reigber of the GeoForschungsZentrum (GFZ) Potsdam.

The two GRACE satellites, GRACE-1 and GRACE-2, were launched from Plesetsk Cosmodrome, Russia, on a Rockot (SS-19 + Briz upper stage) launch vehicle on 17 March 2002. The spacecraft were launched to an initial altitude of approximately 500 km at a near-polar inclination of 89°. During normal operations, the satellites were separated by 220 km along their orbit track. This system was able to gather global coverage every 30 days. GRACE far exceeded its 5-year design lifespan, operating for 15 years until the decommissioning of GRACE-2 on 27 October 2017. Its successor, GRACE-FO, was successfully launched on 22 May 2018.

In 2019, a glacier in West Antarctica was named after the GRACE mission.

== Discoveries and applications ==
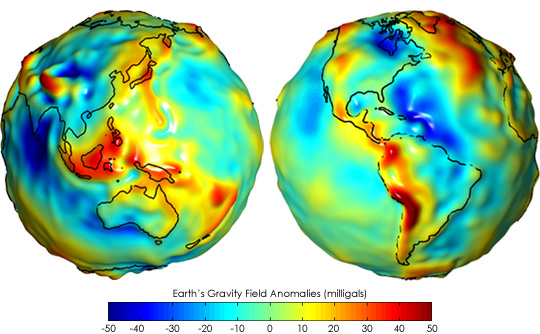
Gravity anomaly map from GRACE

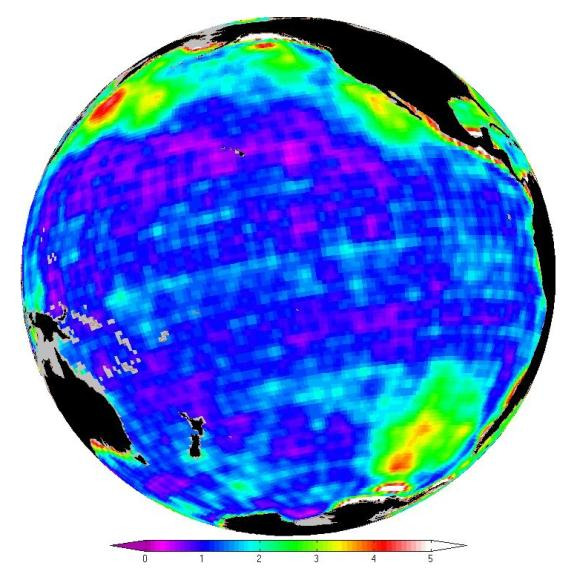
Variations in ocean bottom pressure measured by GRACE

Measurements provided by GRACE have improved understanding of phenomena including the thinning of ice sheets, the flow of water through aquifers, and shifts in the Earth's crust.

=== Oceanography, hydrology, and ice sheets ===
GRACE chiefly detected changes in the distribution of water across the Earth. Scientists use GRACE data to estimate ocean bottom pressure (the combined weight of the ocean waters and atmosphere), which is as important to oceanographers as atmospheric pressure is to meteorologists. For example, measuring ocean pressure gradients allows scientists to estimate monthly changes in deep ocean currents. The limited resolution of GRACE is acceptable in this research because large ocean currents can also be estimated and verified by an ocean buoy network. Scientists have also detailed improved methods for using GRACE data to describe Earth's gravity field. GRACE data help to determine the cause of sea level rise, whether it is the result of mass being added to the ocean – from melting glaciers, for example – or from thermal expansion of warming water or changes in salinity. High-resolution static gravity fields estimated from GRACE data have helped improve the understanding of global ocean circulation. The hills and valleys in the ocean's surface (ocean surface topography) are due to currents and variations in Earth's gravity field. GRACE enables separation of those two effects to better measure ocean currents and their effect on climate.

GRACE data have provided a record of mass loss within the ice sheets of Greenland and Antarctica. Greenland has been found to lose 280±58 Gt of ice per year between 2003 and 2013, while Antarctica has lost 67±44 Gt per year in the same period. These equate to a total of 0.9 mm/yr of sea level rise. Increases in ocean heat content resulting from Earth's Energy Imbalance of about 0.8 W/m^{2} were similarly found spanning 2002 thru 2019.

GRACE data have also provided insights into regional hydrology inaccessible to other forms of remote sensing: for example, groundwater depletion in India and California. The annual hydrology of the Amazon basin provides a strong signal when viewed by GRACE. A University of California, Irvine-led study published in Water Resources Research on 16 June 2015 used GRACE data between 2003 and 2013 to conclude that 21 of the world's 37 largest aquifers "have exceeded sustainability tipping points and are being depleted" and thirteen of them are "considered significantly distressed." The most over-stressed is the Arabian Aquifer System, upon which more than 60 million people depend for water.

=== Geophysics ===
GRACE uses precise measurements of the motions of two spacecraft in Earth's orbit to track the movement of water through the oceans, land, and atmosphere.

Antarctic ice mass variation as measured by GRACE

Greenland ice mass variation as measured by GRACE

GRACE also detects changes in the gravity field due to geophysical processes. Glacial isostatic adjustment—the slow rise of land masses once depressed by the weight of ice sheets from the last ice age—is among these signals. GIA signals appear as secular trends in gravity field measurements and must be removed to accurately estimate changes in water and ice mass in a region. GRACE is also sensitive to permanent changes in the gravity field due to earthquakes. For instance, GRACE data have been used to analyze the shifts in the Earth's crust caused by the earthquake that created the 2004 Indian Ocean tsunami.

In 2006, a team of researchers led by Ralph von Frese and Laramie Potts used GRACE data to discover the 480-kilometer-wide (300 mi) Wilkes Land crater in Antarctica, which was probably formed about 250 million years ago.

=== Geodesy ===
Data from GRACE has improved the current Earth gravitational field model, leading to improvements in the field of geodesy. This improved model has allowed for corrections in the equipotential surface from which land elevations are referenced. This more accurate reference surface allows for more accurate coordinates of latitude and longitude and for less error in the calculation of geodetic satellite orbits.

=== Other signals ===
GRACE is sensitive to regional variations in the mass of the atmosphere and high-frequency variation in ocean bottom pressure. These variations are well understood and are removed from monthly gravity estimates using forecast models to prevent aliasing. Nonetheless, errors in these models influence GRACE solutions.

GRACE data also contribute to fundamental physics. They have been used to re-analyze data obtained from the LAGEOS experiment to try to measure the relativistic frame-dragging effect.

== Spacecraft ==
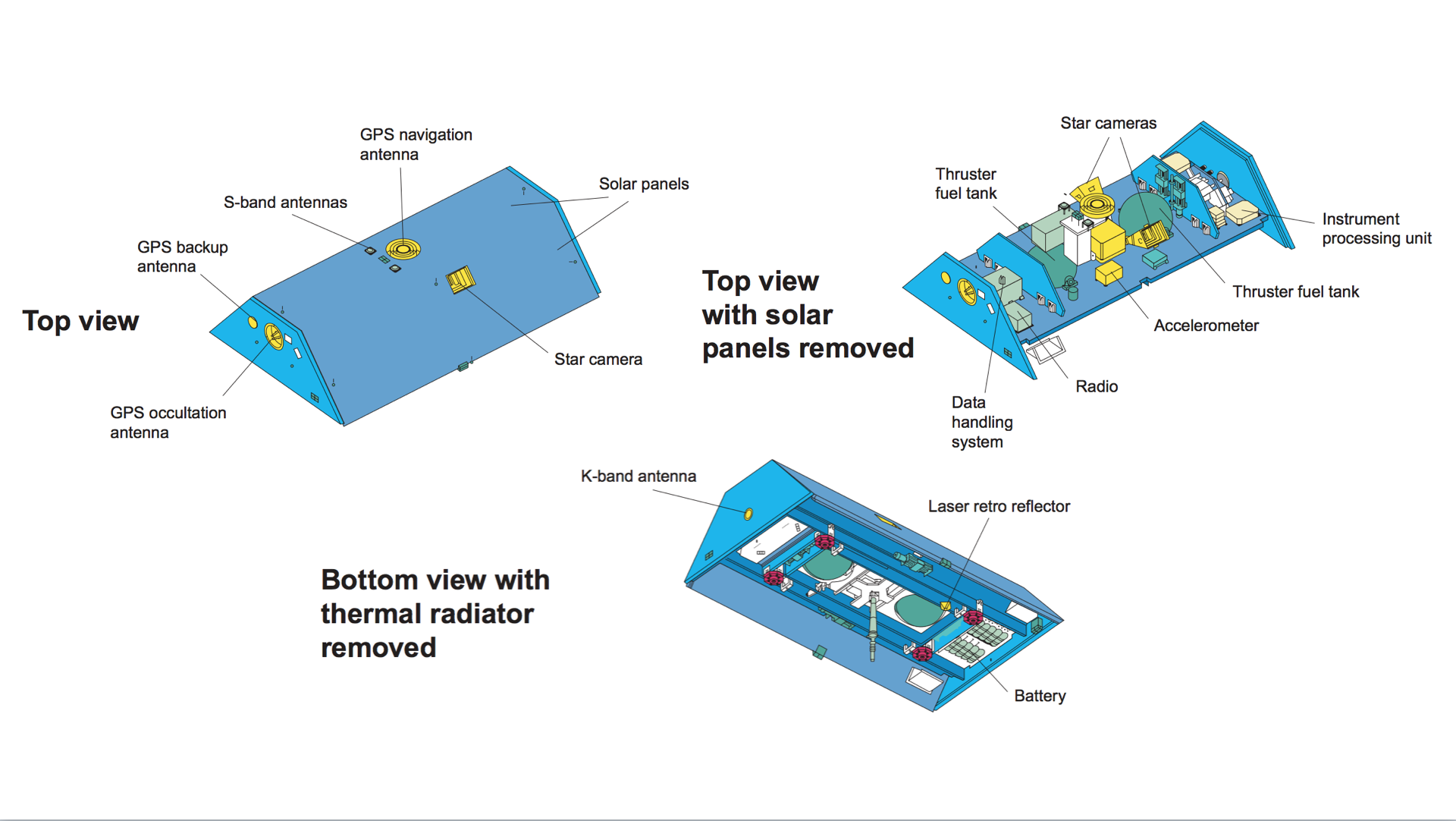
Diagrams illustrating the systems and instruments aboard the GRACE spacecraft

Global gravity anomaly animations over land and oceans by GRACE

The spacecraft were manufactured by Astrium of Germany, using its "Flexbus" platform. The microwave RF systems, and attitude determination and control system algorithms were provided by Space Systems/Loral. The star cameras used to measure the spacecraft attitude were provided by Technical University of Denmark. The instrument computer along with a highly precise BlackJack GPS receiver and digital signal processing system was provided by JPL in Pasadena, California. The highly precise accelerometer that is needed to separate atmospheric and solar radiation pressure effects from the gravitation data was manufactured by ONERA.

=== Measurement principle ===
GRACE's key measurement, satellite gravimetry, is not derived from electromagnetic waves. Instead, the mission uses a microwave ranging system to accurately measure changes in the speed and distance between two identical spacecraft flying in a polar orbit about 220 kilometers (140 mi) apart, 500 kilometers (310 mi) above Earth. The ranging system is sensitive enough to detect separation changes as small as 10 micrometers (approximately one-tenth the width of a human hair) over a distance of 220 kilometers. As the twin GRACE satellites circle the globe 15 times a day, they sense minute variations in Earth's gravitational pull. When the first satellite passes over a region of slightly stronger gravity, a gravity anomaly, it is pulled slightly ahead of the trailing satellite. This causes the distance between the satellites to increase. The first spacecraft then passes the anomaly, and slows again; meanwhile the following spacecraft accelerates, then decelerates over the same point. By measuring the constantly changing distance between the two satellites and combining that data with precise positioning measurements from Global Positioning System (GPS) instruments, scientists can construct a detailed map of Earth's gravity anomalies.

=== Instruments ===
The two satellites (nicknamed "Tom" and "Jerry") constantly maintain a two-way, K-band microwave-ranging link between them. Fine distance measurements are made by comparing frequency shifts of the link. This is made possible due to the onboard Ultra Stable Oscillator (USO) which produces the frequencies for the K-band ranging system. The micrometer-sensitivity of this measurement requires accordingly precise measurements of each spacecraft's position, motion, and orientation to be useful. To remove the effect of external, non-gravitational forces (e.g., drag, solar radiation pressure), the vehicles use sensitive Super STAR electrostatic accelerometers located near their respective centers of mass. GPS receivers are used to establish the precise positions of each satellite along the baseline between the satellites. The satellites use star cameras and magnetometers to establish attitude. The GRACE vehicles also have optical corner reflectors to enable laser ranging from ground stations using the Center of Mass Trim Assembly (MTA) which ensures the center of mass is modified throughout the flight accordingly.

=== Data products ===
CSR, GFZ, and JPL process observations and ancillary data downloaded from GRACE to produce monthly geopotential models of Earth. These models are distributed as spherical harmonic coefficients with a maximum degree of 60. Degree 90 products are also available. These products have a typical latency of 1–2 months. These geopotential coefficients may be used to compute geoid height, gravity anomalies, and changes in the distribution of mass on Earth's surface. Gridded products estimating changes in mass in units of liquid water equivalent thickness are available at JPL's GRACE Tellus website.

== End of mission ==
Following an age-related battery issue on GRACE-2 in September 2017, it became apparent that GRACE-2's remaining battery capacity would not be sufficient to operate. Therefore, it was decided in mid-October to decommission the GRACE-2 satellite and end GRACE's science mission. Atmospheric reentry of GRACE-2 occurred on 24 December 2017 at approximately 00:16 UTC; atmospheric reentry of GRACE-1 took place on 10 March 2018 around 06:09 UTC.

== GRACE Follow-On ==
GRACE-FO
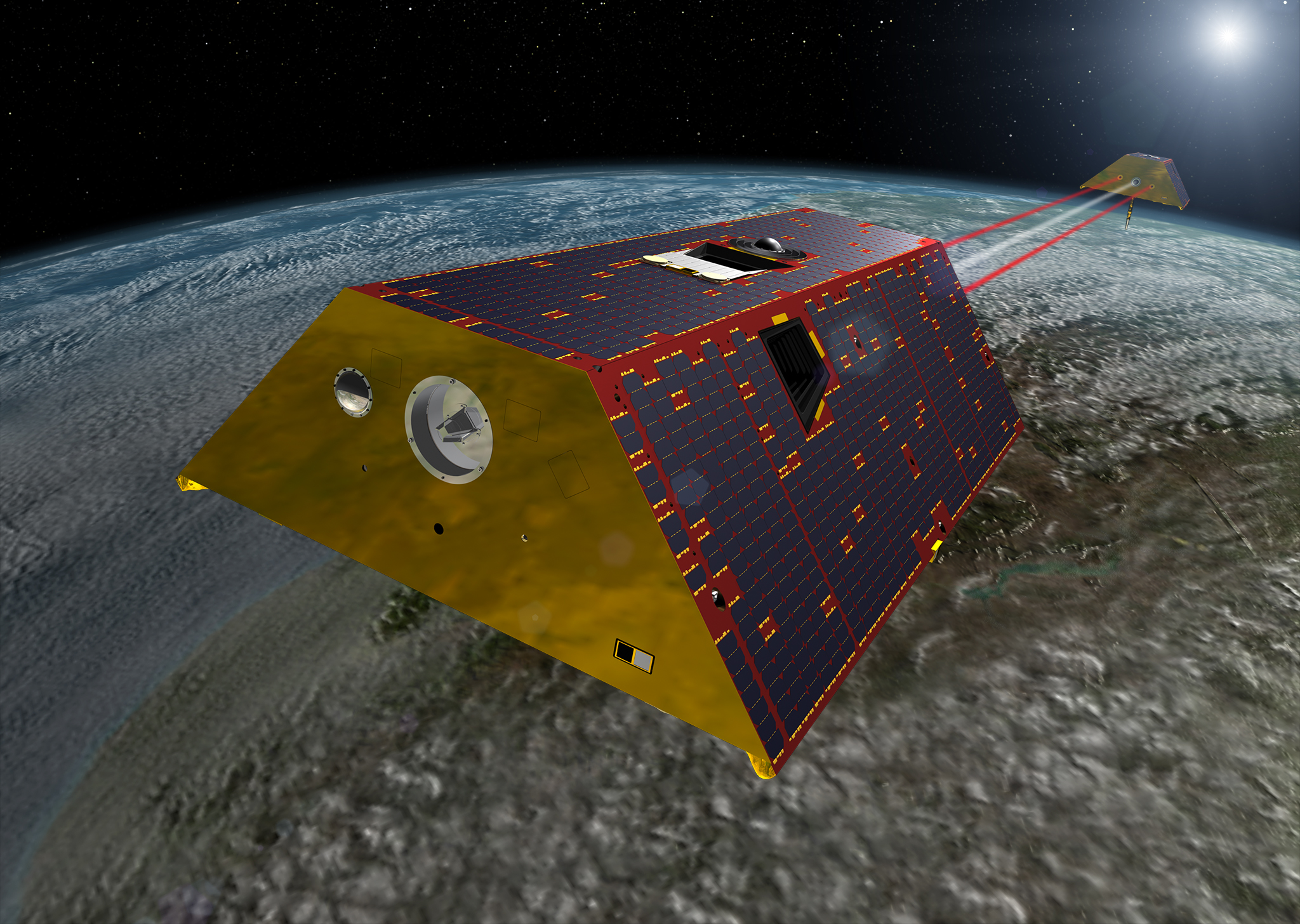
- Illustration of the twin GRACE-FO satellites
- Names: GRACE-FO 1; GRACE-FO 2
- Mission type: Gravitational science
- Operator: NASA · DLR
- COSPAR ID: 2018-047A; 2018-047B
- SATCAT no.: 43476 and 43477
- Website: nasa.gov/missions/grace-fo/
- Mission duration: Planned: 5 years Elapsed: 8 years, 5 months, 12 days

Spacecraft properties
- Bus: Flexbus
- Manufacturer: Airbus Defence and Space (formerly Astrium)
- Launch mass: 600 kg (1,300 lb) each
- Dimensions: 1.943 × 3.123 × 0.78 m (6.4 × 10.2 × 2.6 ft)

Start of mission
- Launch date: 22 May 2018, 19:47:58 UTC
- Rocket: Falcon 9 Block 4 B1043-2
- Launch site: Vandenberg AFB, California
- Contractor: SpaceX

Orbital parameters
- Reference system: Geocentric
- Semi-major axis: 6,872.2 km (4,270.2 mi)
- Eccentricity: 0.00179
- Perigee altitude: 481.7 km (299.3 mi)
- Apogee altitude: 506.3 km (314.6 mi)
- Inclination: 89.0°
- Period: 94.5 minutes
- Epoch: 29 September 2019, 15:36:45 UTC

The GRACE-FO mission, a collaboration between NASA and GFZ, was launched on 22 May 2018 aboard a SpaceX Falcon 9 rocket from Vandenberg AFB, California, sharing the launch with five Iridium NEXT satellites. During in-orbit checks, an anomaly was discovered in the primary system component of the microwave instrument (MWI), and the system was temporarily powered down on 19 July 2018. After an investigation by an anomaly response team at JPL, the backup system in the MWI was powered up on 19 October 2018 and GRACE-FO resumed its in-orbit checks. GRACE-FO entered the science phase of its mission on 28 January 2019.

The orbit and design of GRACE-FO is similar to its predecessor. GRACE-FO employs the same two-way microwave-ranging link as GRACE, which will allow for similar inter-satellite ranging precision. In addition, GRACE-FO employs laser-ranging interferometry (LRI) as a technological experiment in preparation for future satellites. The LRI allows for more accurate inter-satellite ranging due to the shorter wavelength of light, and additionally allows the angle between the two spacecraft to be measured as well as their separation via differential wavefront sensing (DWS). Using the LRI, scientists have improved the precision of the separation distance measurements by a factor of more than 20 relative to the GRACE mission. Each laser on the LRI has about the same power as four laser pointers. These lasers must be detected by a spacecraft about 220 kilometres (140 mi) away. This laser approach will generate much more accurate measurements than the previous GRACE satellite mission.

The GRACE-FO satellites obtain electricity from gallium arsenide solar cell array panels covering the outside of each satellite.

GRACE-FO continue to monitor Earth's gravity and climate. The mission will track gravitational changes in global sea levels, glaciers, and ice sheets, as well as large lake and river water levels, and soil moisture. In addition, each of the satellites will use GPS antennas to create at least 200 profiles per day of atmospheric temperature distribution and water vapor content, a first for the GRACE mission.

GRACE-FO has a design life of five years.

== See also ==
- CHAMP, an earlier single satellite mission using a similar "Flexbus" platform
- GOCE, an ESA gravity mapping mission that used only a single satellite
- GRAIL, a similar NASA probe pair that mapped the Moon
- NGGM, a proposed ESA mission to follow GRACE-FO
