= List of minor planets: 382001–383000 =

The following is a partial list of minor planets, running from minor-planet number 382001 through 383000, inclusive. The primary data for this and other partial lists is based on JPL's "Small-Body Orbital Elements" and data available from the Minor Planet Center. Critical list information is also provided by the MPC, unless otherwise specified from Lowell Observatory. A detailed description of the table's columns and additional sources are given on the main page including a complete list of every page in this series, and a statistical break-up on the dynamical classification of minor planets.

Also see the summary list of all named bodies in numerical and alphabetical order, and the corresponding naming citations for the number range of this particular list. New namings may only be added to this list after official publication, as the preannouncement of names is condemned by the Working Group for Small Bodies Nomenclature of the International Astronomical Union.

| Near-Earth obj. | MBA (inner) | MBA (outer) | Centaur |
| Mars-crosser | MBA (middle) | Jupiter trojan | Trans-Neptunian obj. |
| Unclassified |

== 382001–382100 ==
| Designation | | | Discovery | | | Properties | | Ref |
| Permanent | Provisional | Named after | Date | Site | Discoverer(s) | Category | Diam. | Ref |
|---|---|---|---|---|---|---|---|---|
| 382001 | 2010 OM_{15} | — | July 17, 2010 | WISE | WISE | LUT | 4.8 km | MPC · JPL |
| 382002 | 2010 OK_{46} | — | April 15, 2010 | Mount Lemmon | Mount Lemmon Survey | LIX | 4.4 km | MPC · JPL |
| 382003 | 2010 OZ_{60} | — | July 23, 2010 | WISE | WISE | · | 3.7 km | MPC · JPL |
| 382004 | 2010 RM_{64} | — | September 9, 2010 | La Silla | D. L. Rabinowitz, M. E. Schwamb, S. Tourtellotte | T_{j} (2.78) · centaur | 21 km | MPC · JPL |
| 382005 | 2010 TO_{6} | — | October 1, 2010 | Catalina | CSS | H | 550 m | MPC · JPL |
| 382006 | 2010 UF_{52} | — | October 28, 2010 | Mount Lemmon | Mount Lemmon Survey | H | 650 m | MPC · JPL |
| 382007 | 2010 UD_{107} | — | February 1, 2006 | Mount Lemmon | Mount Lemmon Survey | H | 720 m | MPC · JPL |
| 382008 | 2010 XE_{83} | — | February 7, 2008 | Mount Lemmon | Mount Lemmon Survey | · | 630 m | MPC · JPL |
| 382009 | 2011 AW_{4} | — | October 17, 2003 | Kitt Peak | Spacewatch | · | 720 m | MPC · JPL |
| 382010 | 2011 AN_{20} | — | April 15, 2008 | Mount Lemmon | Mount Lemmon Survey | V | 740 m | MPC · JPL |
| 382011 | 2011 AQ_{47} | — | February 9, 2008 | Kitt Peak | Spacewatch | · | 530 m | MPC · JPL |
| 382012 | 2011 AC_{58} | — | March 2, 1995 | Kitt Peak | Spacewatch | · | 640 m | MPC · JPL |
| 382013 | 2011 AG_{65} | — | December 17, 2003 | Kitt Peak | Spacewatch | · | 1.0 km | MPC · JPL |
| 382014 | 2011 BQ_{11} | — | July 12, 2004 | Reedy Creek | J. Broughton | · | 2.0 km | MPC · JPL |
| 382015 | 2011 BV_{46} | — | August 29, 2005 | Kitt Peak | Spacewatch | · | 1.5 km | MPC · JPL |
| 382016 | 2011 BH_{53} | — | November 15, 2006 | Kitt Peak | Spacewatch | · | 870 m | MPC · JPL |
| 382017 | 2011 BK_{53} | — | March 28, 2004 | Kitt Peak | Spacewatch | · | 1.2 km | MPC · JPL |
| 382018 | 2011 BT_{53} | — | November 15, 2006 | Kitt Peak | Spacewatch | · | 760 m | MPC · JPL |
| 382019 | 2011 BM_{62} | — | December 12, 2006 | Mount Lemmon | Mount Lemmon Survey | NYS | 1.3 km | MPC · JPL |
| 382020 | 2011 BR_{62} | — | May 9, 2004 | Kitt Peak | Spacewatch | V | 750 m | MPC · JPL |
| 382021 | 2011 BN_{70} | — | March 12, 1996 | Kitt Peak | Spacewatch | · | 1.4 km | MPC · JPL |
| 382022 | 2011 BE_{74} | — | September 14, 1991 | Kitt Peak | Spacewatch | · | 1.1 km | MPC · JPL |
| 382023 | 2011 BX_{91} | — | December 25, 2005 | Kitt Peak | Spacewatch | WAT | 2.1 km | MPC · JPL |
| 382024 | 2011 BN_{102} | — | March 8, 2008 | Kitt Peak | Spacewatch | · | 740 m | MPC · JPL |
| 382025 | 2011 BG_{108} | — | April 6, 1999 | Kitt Peak | Spacewatch | · | 1.2 km | MPC · JPL |
| 382026 | 2011 BE_{125} | — | June 17, 2005 | Mount Lemmon | Mount Lemmon Survey | · | 670 m | MPC · JPL |
| 382027 | 2011 BT_{161} | — | September 26, 2006 | Kitt Peak | Spacewatch | · | 780 m | MPC · JPL |
| 382028 | 2011 CB_{11} | — | November 18, 2006 | Kitt Peak | Spacewatch | NYS | 850 m | MPC · JPL |
| 382029 | 2011 CJ_{17} | — | March 17, 2004 | Kitt Peak | Spacewatch | V | 820 m | MPC · JPL |
| 382030 | 2011 CP_{18} | — | October 4, 2006 | Mount Lemmon | Mount Lemmon Survey | · | 820 m | MPC · JPL |
| 382031 | 2011 CV_{22} | — | October 13, 2006 | Kitt Peak | Spacewatch | · | 680 m | MPC · JPL |
| 382032 | 2011 CW_{23} | — | April 5, 2000 | Kitt Peak | Spacewatch | · | 1.1 km | MPC · JPL |
| 382033 | 2011 CR_{24} | — | December 13, 2006 | Kitt Peak | Spacewatch | · | 2.0 km | MPC · JPL |
| 382034 | 2011 CJ_{27} | — | February 29, 2000 | Socorro | LINEAR | MAS | 680 m | MPC · JPL |
| 382035 | 2011 CF_{35} | — | July 7, 2005 | Mauna Kea | Veillet, C. | · | 870 m | MPC · JPL |
| 382036 | 2011 CT_{47} | — | November 11, 2006 | Mount Lemmon | Mount Lemmon Survey | BAP | 910 m | MPC · JPL |
| 382037 | 2011 CD_{48} | — | September 27, 2006 | Kitt Peak | Spacewatch | · | 680 m | MPC · JPL |
| 382038 | 2011 CX_{60} | — | November 13, 2006 | Kitt Peak | Spacewatch | · | 720 m | MPC · JPL |
| 382039 | 2011 CX_{68} | — | October 2, 2006 | Mount Lemmon | Mount Lemmon Survey | · | 780 m | MPC · JPL |
| 382040 | 2011 CX_{80} | — | December 12, 2006 | Kitt Peak | Spacewatch | MAS | 570 m | MPC · JPL |
| 382041 | 2011 CF_{86} | — | April 5, 2000 | Socorro | LINEAR | NYS | 1.4 km | MPC · JPL |
| 382042 | 2011 CU_{91} | — | November 20, 2003 | Kitt Peak | Spacewatch | · | 730 m | MPC · JPL |
| 382043 | 2011 DU_{2} | — | November 19, 2006 | Kitt Peak | Spacewatch | · | 1.1 km | MPC · JPL |
| 382044 | 2011 DP_{5} | — | November 22, 2006 | Mount Lemmon | Mount Lemmon Survey | · | 1 km | MPC · JPL |
| 382045 | 2011 DB_{10} | — | February 8, 2007 | Kitt Peak | Spacewatch | MAS | 810 m | MPC · JPL |
| 382046 | 2011 DX_{10} | — | December 17, 2006 | Mount Lemmon | Mount Lemmon Survey | · | 900 m | MPC · JPL |
| 382047 | 2011 DB_{11} | — | January 29, 2004 | Anderson Mesa | LONEOS | · | 880 m | MPC · JPL |
| 382048 | 2011 DX_{11} | — | March 17, 1996 | Kitt Peak | Spacewatch | NYS | 1.2 km | MPC · JPL |
| 382049 | 2011 DW_{22} | — | March 14, 2007 | Kitt Peak | Spacewatch | · | 1.5 km | MPC · JPL |
| 382050 | 2011 DK_{25} | — | July 5, 2005 | Mount Lemmon | Mount Lemmon Survey | V | 850 m | MPC · JPL |
| 382051 | 2011 DG_{29} | — | March 9, 2007 | Mount Lemmon | Mount Lemmon Survey | · | 1.2 km | MPC · JPL |
| 382052 | 2011 DL_{30} | — | April 22, 2004 | Kitt Peak | Spacewatch | MAS | 760 m | MPC · JPL |
| 382053 | 2011 DW_{31} | — | March 15, 2004 | Kitt Peak | Spacewatch | · | 670 m | MPC · JPL |
| 382054 | 2011 EU_{2} | — | April 11, 2008 | Kitt Peak | Spacewatch | · | 770 m | MPC · JPL |
| 382055 | 2011 ES_{13} | — | March 3, 2000 | Socorro | LINEAR | · | 1.1 km | MPC · JPL |
| 382056 | 2011 ER_{15} | — | March 4, 2011 | Kitt Peak | Spacewatch | · | 1.7 km | MPC · JPL |
| 382057 | 2011 ES_{17} | — | February 17, 2004 | Goodricke-Pigott | R. A. Tucker | · | 1.1 km | MPC · JPL |
| 382058 | 2011 EC_{18} | — | January 28, 2007 | Kitt Peak | Spacewatch | · | 1.7 km | MPC · JPL |
| 382059 | 2011 EQ_{22} | — | April 14, 2004 | Kitt Peak | Spacewatch | · | 1.4 km | MPC · JPL |
| 382060 | 2011 EJ_{24} | — | October 24, 2001 | Kitt Peak | Spacewatch | · | 1.9 km | MPC · JPL |
| 382061 | 2011 ED_{30} | — | March 4, 2001 | Kitt Peak | Spacewatch | · | 750 m | MPC · JPL |
| 382062 | 2011 EY_{33} | — | September 14, 2009 | Kitt Peak | Spacewatch | · | 950 m | MPC · JPL |
| 382063 | 2011 ES_{39} | — | November 24, 2008 | Kitt Peak | Spacewatch | HYG | 3.3 km | MPC · JPL |
| 382064 | 2011 ET_{39} | — | March 15, 2004 | Kitt Peak | Spacewatch | · | 810 m | MPC · JPL |
| 382065 | 2011 EG_{42} | — | February 8, 2002 | Kitt Peak | Spacewatch | · | 1.9 km | MPC · JPL |
| 382066 | 2011 EQ_{44} | — | January 30, 2011 | Kitt Peak | Spacewatch | · | 2.9 km | MPC · JPL |
| 382067 | 2011 EU_{53} | — | October 12, 2005 | Kitt Peak | Spacewatch | · | 1.4 km | MPC · JPL |
| 382068 | 2011 ET_{54} | — | April 14, 2004 | Kitt Peak | Spacewatch | · | 1.3 km | MPC · JPL |
| 382069 | 2011 ER_{63} | — | December 21, 2006 | Kitt Peak | Spacewatch | · | 1.2 km | MPC · JPL |
| 382070 | 2011 EL_{73} | — | February 27, 2006 | Kitt Peak | Spacewatch | · | 2.1 km | MPC · JPL |
| 382071 | 2011 EV_{75} | — | October 1, 2005 | Mount Lemmon | Mount Lemmon Survey | MAS | 850 m | MPC · JPL |
| 382072 | 2011 FD_{6} | — | November 18, 1998 | La Palma | A. Fitzsimmons, R. Budden | · | 1.5 km | MPC · JPL |
| 382073 | 2011 FV_{15} | — | October 22, 2009 | Mount Lemmon | Mount Lemmon Survey | MAS | 780 m | MPC · JPL |
| 382074 | 2011 FY_{15} | — | November 6, 2005 | Mount Lemmon | Mount Lemmon Survey | · | 1.1 km | MPC · JPL |
| 382075 | 2011 FK_{16} | — | May 6, 2006 | Mount Lemmon | Mount Lemmon Survey | · | 2.9 km | MPC · JPL |
| 382076 | 2011 FA_{18} | — | January 10, 2007 | Mount Lemmon | Mount Lemmon Survey | NYS | 1.4 km | MPC · JPL |
| 382077 | 2011 FR_{27} | — | March 14, 2011 | Catalina | CSS | HNS | 1.5 km | MPC · JPL |
| 382078 | 2011 FH_{28} | — | December 14, 2010 | Kitt Peak | Spacewatch | BRA | 2.4 km | MPC · JPL |
| 382079 | 2011 FE_{33} | — | January 29, 2007 | Kitt Peak | Spacewatch | · | 1.5 km | MPC · JPL |
| 382080 | 2011 FL_{38} | — | August 23, 2008 | Kitt Peak | Spacewatch | · | 1.7 km | MPC · JPL |
| 382081 | 2011 FV_{54} | — | January 25, 2007 | Kitt Peak | Spacewatch | · | 1.3 km | MPC · JPL |
| 382082 | 2011 FM_{79} | — | December 1, 2005 | Kitt Peak | Spacewatch | · | 1.3 km | MPC · JPL |
| 382083 | 2011 FV_{80} | — | February 22, 2011 | Kitt Peak | Spacewatch | MAS | 650 m | MPC · JPL |
| 382084 | 2011 FA_{84} | — | October 6, 2008 | Mount Lemmon | Mount Lemmon Survey | · | 3.0 km | MPC · JPL |
| 382085 | 2011 FU_{96} | — | November 5, 2005 | Kitt Peak | Spacewatch | · | 920 m | MPC · JPL |
| 382086 | 2011 FO_{127} | — | March 18, 2004 | Kitt Peak | Spacewatch | · | 980 m | MPC · JPL |
| 382087 | 2011 FC_{130} | — | January 3, 2000 | Kitt Peak | Spacewatch | · | 870 m | MPC · JPL |
| 382088 | 2011 FL_{142} | — | October 26, 2005 | Kitt Peak | Spacewatch | · | 1.2 km | MPC · JPL |
| 382089 | 2011 FU_{142} | — | March 2, 2011 | Kitt Peak | Spacewatch | EOS | 2.0 km | MPC · JPL |
| 382090 | 2011 FG_{151} | — | February 25, 2007 | Kitt Peak | Spacewatch | BAR | 1.8 km | MPC · JPL |
| 382091 | 2011 GU_{1} | — | December 16, 2009 | Mount Lemmon | Mount Lemmon Survey | · | 2.2 km | MPC · JPL |
| 382092 | 2011 GL_{5} | — | April 17, 2007 | Catalina | CSS | · | 3.4 km | MPC · JPL |
| 382093 | 2011 GE_{34} | — | May 12, 2007 | Mount Lemmon | Mount Lemmon Survey | · | 1.5 km | MPC · JPL |
| 382094 | 2011 GA_{37} | — | January 30, 2006 | Kitt Peak | Spacewatch | · | 2.0 km | MPC · JPL |
| 382095 | 2011 GQ_{42} | — | March 6, 2011 | Mount Lemmon | Mount Lemmon Survey | (5) | 1.6 km | MPC · JPL |
| 382096 | 2011 GT_{49} | — | October 9, 2004 | Kitt Peak | Spacewatch | · | 1.8 km | MPC · JPL |
| 382097 | 2011 GN_{50} | — | October 6, 2008 | Mount Lemmon | Mount Lemmon Survey | · | 3.5 km | MPC · JPL |
| 382098 | 2011 GT_{58} | — | April 25, 2003 | Kitt Peak | Spacewatch | · | 1.2 km | MPC · JPL |
| 382099 | 2011 GA_{63} | — | October 4, 2004 | Kitt Peak | Spacewatch | · | 1.6 km | MPC · JPL |
| 382100 | 2011 GA_{66} | — | March 11, 2007 | Kitt Peak | Spacewatch | · | 1.4 km | MPC · JPL |

== 382101–382200 ==
back to top

| Designation | | | Discovery | | | Properties | | Ref |
| Permanent | Provisional | Named after | Date | Site | Discoverer(s) | Category | Diam. | Ref |
|---|---|---|---|---|---|---|---|---|
| 382101 | 2011 GY_{66} | — | January 15, 2007 | Kitt Peak | Spacewatch | · | 1.8 km | MPC · JPL |
| 382102 | 2011 GJ_{67} | — | November 10, 2009 | Kitt Peak | Spacewatch | (5) | 1.3 km | MPC · JPL |
| 382103 | 2011 GQ_{69} | — | October 1, 2005 | Mount Lemmon | Mount Lemmon Survey | · | 1.2 km | MPC · JPL |
| 382104 | 2011 GG_{70} | — | November 20, 2009 | Mount Lemmon | Mount Lemmon Survey | · | 1.5 km | MPC · JPL |
| 382105 | 2011 GO_{72} | — | October 9, 2007 | Mount Lemmon | Mount Lemmon Survey | · | 2.8 km | MPC · JPL |
| 382106 | 2011 GQ_{76} | — | October 10, 2007 | Catalina | CSS | · | 3.8 km | MPC · JPL |
| 382107 | 2011 HA | — | April 24, 2007 | Kitt Peak | Spacewatch | · | 1.9 km | MPC · JPL |
| 382108 | 2011 HO_{3} | — | November 20, 2009 | Kitt Peak | Spacewatch | EUN | 1.0 km | MPC · JPL |
| 382109 | 2011 HB_{15} | — | October 14, 2004 | Kitt Peak | Spacewatch | · | 1.9 km | MPC · JPL |
| 382110 | 2011 HJ_{15} | — | November 16, 2009 | Mount Lemmon | Mount Lemmon Survey | · | 1.4 km | MPC · JPL |
| 382111 | 2011 HD_{17} | — | April 11, 2007 | Kitt Peak | Spacewatch | · | 1.7 km | MPC · JPL |
| 382112 | 2011 HV_{27} | — | November 3, 2008 | Mount Lemmon | Mount Lemmon Survey | · | 2.5 km | MPC · JPL |
| 382113 | 2011 HG_{28} | — | March 8, 2005 | Catalina | CSS | · | 4.3 km | MPC · JPL |
| 382114 | 2011 HU_{32} | — | October 21, 2007 | Mount Lemmon | Mount Lemmon Survey | · | 3.0 km | MPC · JPL |
| 382115 | 2011 HG_{33} | — | April 22, 2007 | Kitt Peak | Spacewatch | · | 3.6 km | MPC · JPL |
| 382116 | 2011 HV_{36} | — | October 7, 2008 | Mount Lemmon | Mount Lemmon Survey | · | 2.2 km | MPC · JPL |
| 382117 | 2011 HN_{56} | — | November 20, 2009 | Mount Lemmon | Mount Lemmon Survey | · | 1.0 km | MPC · JPL |
| 382118 | 2011 HX_{56} | — | December 21, 2000 | Uccle | T. Pauwels | · | 2.3 km | MPC · JPL |
| 382119 | 2011 HN_{69} | — | February 9, 2007 | Kitt Peak | Spacewatch | NYS | 970 m | MPC · JPL |
| 382120 | 2011 HR_{74} | — | March 10, 2005 | Catalina | CSS | · | 6.0 km | MPC · JPL |
| 382121 | 2011 HG_{77} | — | September 14, 2007 | Siding Spring | SSS | · | 4.1 km | MPC · JPL |
| 382122 | 2011 HD_{80} | — | February 25, 2006 | Kitt Peak | Spacewatch | · | 1.9 km | MPC · JPL |
| 382123 | 2011 HX_{81} | — | October 30, 2005 | Mount Lemmon | Mount Lemmon Survey | KON | 3.4 km | MPC · JPL |
| 382124 | 2011 HO_{84} | — | September 22, 2008 | Kitt Peak | Spacewatch | AGN | 1.5 km | MPC · JPL |
| 382125 | 2011 HE_{91} | — | October 6, 2008 | Mount Lemmon | Mount Lemmon Survey | · | 2.0 km | MPC · JPL |
| 382126 | 2011 HP_{92} | — | December 1, 2005 | Kitt Peak | Spacewatch | · | 2.0 km | MPC · JPL |
| 382127 | 2011 HR_{95} | — | November 22, 2009 | Catalina | CSS | · | 1.1 km | MPC · JPL |
| 382128 | 2011 HX_{100} | — | October 29, 2008 | Mount Lemmon | Mount Lemmon Survey | · | 2.9 km | MPC · JPL |
| 382129 | 2011 JV_{24} | — | January 30, 2006 | Catalina | CSS | · | 1.9 km | MPC · JPL |
| 382130 | 2011 JR_{27} | — | November 1, 2008 | Mount Lemmon | Mount Lemmon Survey | · | 4.3 km | MPC · JPL |
| 382131 | 2011 JS_{30} | — | October 12, 2007 | Catalina | CSS | · | 4.5 km | MPC · JPL |
| 382132 | 2011 KN_{6} | — | January 31, 2006 | Kitt Peak | Spacewatch | · | 1.4 km | MPC · JPL |
| 382133 | 2011 KP_{7} | — | April 2, 2005 | Catalina | CSS | THB | 3.5 km | MPC · JPL |
| 382134 | 2011 KM_{12} | — | November 12, 2005 | Kitt Peak | Spacewatch | · | 2.1 km | MPC · JPL |
| 382135 | 2011 KJ_{14} | — | November 30, 2008 | Kitt Peak | Spacewatch | · | 2.4 km | MPC · JPL |
| 382136 | 2011 KN_{21} | — | September 24, 2008 | Catalina | CSS | · | 2.2 km | MPC · JPL |
| 382137 | 2011 KY_{24} | — | September 27, 2008 | Mount Lemmon | Mount Lemmon Survey | MRX | 1.1 km | MPC · JPL |
| 382138 | 2011 KC_{25} | — | February 16, 2010 | Mount Lemmon | Mount Lemmon Survey | · | 2.9 km | MPC · JPL |
| 382139 | 2011 KS_{27} | — | October 19, 2000 | Kitt Peak | Spacewatch | · | 1.5 km | MPC · JPL |
| 382140 | 2011 KS_{29} | — | November 18, 2008 | Kitt Peak | Spacewatch | · | 3.3 km | MPC · JPL |
| 382141 | 2011 KE_{30} | — | March 24, 2006 | Siding Spring | SSS | · | 2.7 km | MPC · JPL |
| 382142 | 2011 KE_{37} | — | April 7, 2006 | Catalina | CSS | · | 2.6 km | MPC · JPL |
| 382143 | 2011 KS_{44} | — | January 30, 2011 | Haleakala | Pan-STARRS 1 | (8737) | 3.1 km | MPC · JPL |
| 382144 | 2011 KX_{44} | — | December 4, 2005 | Kitt Peak | Spacewatch | · | 1.1 km | MPC · JPL |
| 382145 | 2011 LX_{7} | — | November 10, 2004 | Kitt Peak | Spacewatch | GEF | 1.6 km | MPC · JPL |
| 382146 | 2011 LT_{21} | — | March 10, 2005 | Kitt Peak | Spacewatch | · | 2.9 km | MPC · JPL |
| 382147 | 2011 LU_{22} | — | May 28, 2010 | WISE | WISE | EOS | 2.1 km | MPC · JPL |
| 382148 | 2011 MC_{3} | — | March 7, 2005 | Socorro | LINEAR | BRA | 2.2 km | MPC · JPL |
| 382149 | 2011 MB_{5} | — | January 23, 2006 | Mount Lemmon | Mount Lemmon Survey | · | 2.0 km | MPC · JPL |
| 382150 | 2011 QN_{3} | — | July 28, 2011 | Haleakala | Pan-STARRS 1 | L5 | 7.3 km | MPC · JPL |
| 382151 | 2011 QJ_{95} | — | April 22, 2010 | WISE | WISE | L5 | 10 km | MPC · JPL |
| 382152 | 2011 UW_{404} | — | February 10, 1996 | Kitt Peak | Spacewatch | · | 4.5 km | MPC · JPL |
| 382153 | 2012 EX_{14} | — | November 2, 2000 | Socorro | LINEAR | H | 710 m | MPC · JPL |
| 382154 | 2012 FV_{60} | — | April 18, 2005 | Kitt Peak | Spacewatch | · | 1.1 km | MPC · JPL |
| 382155 | 2012 FM_{67} | — | February 8, 2008 | Kitt Peak | Spacewatch | · | 1.4 km | MPC · JPL |
| 382156 | 2012 FD_{74} | — | February 23, 2012 | Mount Lemmon | Mount Lemmon Survey | TIN | 1.2 km | MPC · JPL |
| 382157 | 2012 GS_{18} | — | January 18, 2005 | Kitt Peak | Spacewatch | · | 840 m | MPC · JPL |
| 382158 | 2012 GK_{33} | — | September 30, 2003 | Kitt Peak | Spacewatch | · | 580 m | MPC · JPL |
| 382159 | 2012 HX_{2} | — | December 30, 2008 | Catalina | CSS | H | 720 m | MPC · JPL |
| 382160 | 2012 HV_{39} | — | June 3, 2005 | Kitt Peak | Spacewatch | · | 1.2 km | MPC · JPL |
| 382161 | 2012 HM_{41} | — | February 13, 2011 | Mount Lemmon | Mount Lemmon Survey | EUN | 1.5 km | MPC · JPL |
| 382162 | 2012 HP_{42} | — | September 16, 2003 | Kitt Peak | Spacewatch | · | 680 m | MPC · JPL |
| 382163 | 2012 HZ_{47} | — | January 10, 2008 | Kitt Peak | Spacewatch | · | 730 m | MPC · JPL |
| 382164 | 2012 HX_{49} | — | September 15, 2010 | Catalina | CSS | H | 560 m | MPC · JPL |
| 382165 | 2012 HT_{63} | — | December 31, 2005 | Kitt Peak | Spacewatch | · | 1.2 km | MPC · JPL |
| 382166 | 2012 HY_{64} | — | December 6, 2010 | Kitt Peak | Spacewatch | · | 700 m | MPC · JPL |
| 382167 | 2012 HQ_{73} | — | October 9, 2010 | Catalina | CSS | H | 640 m | MPC · JPL |
| 382168 | 2012 HP_{79} | — | October 29, 2008 | Kitt Peak | Spacewatch | T_{j} (2.99) · (895) | 3.5 km | MPC · JPL |
| 382169 | 2012 JU_{13} | — | January 15, 2005 | Kitt Peak | Spacewatch | · | 1.0 km | MPC · JPL |
| 382170 | 2012 JB_{20} | — | March 4, 2005 | Kitt Peak | Spacewatch | · | 720 m | MPC · JPL |
| 382171 | 2012 JB_{24} | — | November 8, 2010 | Mount Lemmon | Mount Lemmon Survey | · | 730 m | MPC · JPL |
| 382172 | 2012 JX_{24} | — | May 17, 2009 | Calvin-Rehoboth | L. A. Molnar | · | 1.1 km | MPC · JPL |
| 382173 | 2012 JC_{25} | — | March 17, 2005 | Kitt Peak | Spacewatch | · | 680 m | MPC · JPL |
| 382174 | 2012 JJ_{25} | — | September 8, 1997 | Caussols | ODAS | · | 1.4 km | MPC · JPL |
| 382175 | 2012 JK_{25} | — | November 11, 2007 | Mount Lemmon | Mount Lemmon Survey | · | 1.3 km | MPC · JPL |
| 382176 | 2012 JR_{25} | — | August 11, 2004 | Reedy Creek | J. Broughton | · | 1.3 km | MPC · JPL |
| 382177 | 2012 JK_{33} | — | May 6, 2008 | Mount Lemmon | Mount Lemmon Survey | (5) | 1.8 km | MPC · JPL |
| 382178 | 2012 JH_{43} | — | October 7, 2002 | Kitt Peak | Spacewatch | · | 950 m | MPC · JPL |
| 382179 | 2012 JQ_{45} | — | July 30, 2008 | Siding Spring | SSS | · | 2.0 km | MPC · JPL |
| 382180 | 2012 JG_{48} | — | October 27, 2009 | Kitt Peak | Spacewatch | · | 830 m | MPC · JPL |
| 382181 | 2012 KW_{4} | — | July 28, 2009 | Catalina | CSS | PHO | 1.3 km | MPC · JPL |
| 382182 | 2012 KX_{8} | — | January 17, 2007 | Kitt Peak | Spacewatch | · | 1.3 km | MPC · JPL |
| 382183 | 2012 KG_{13} | — | December 16, 2009 | Mount Lemmon | Mount Lemmon Survey | · | 1.7 km | MPC · JPL |
| 382184 | 2012 KU_{17} | — | July 30, 2000 | Socorro | LINEAR | · | 1.3 km | MPC · JPL |
| 382185 | 2012 KF_{18} | — | May 18, 2007 | XuYi | PMO NEO Survey Program | H | 650 m | MPC · JPL |
| 382186 | 2012 KX_{26} | — | March 9, 2002 | Kitt Peak | Spacewatch | · | 630 m | MPC · JPL |
| 382187 | 2012 KV_{31} | — | February 4, 2005 | Mount Lemmon | Mount Lemmon Survey | · | 620 m | MPC · JPL |
| 382188 | 2012 KL_{34} | — | November 10, 2004 | Kitt Peak | Spacewatch | DOR | 2.1 km | MPC · JPL |
| 382189 | 2012 KA_{43} | — | November 4, 2005 | Kitt Peak | Spacewatch | · | 1.6 km | MPC · JPL |
| 382190 | 2012 KJ_{46} | — | February 26, 2007 | Mount Lemmon | Mount Lemmon Survey | · | 2.0 km | MPC · JPL |
| 382191 | 2012 KS_{50} | — | September 20, 2007 | Catalina | CSS | T_{j} (2.98) | 3.6 km | MPC · JPL |
| 382192 | 2012 LZ_{9} | — | January 8, 2011 | Mount Lemmon | Mount Lemmon Survey | · | 2.1 km | MPC · JPL |
| 382193 | 2012 LC_{15} | — | November 21, 2008 | Mount Lemmon | Mount Lemmon Survey | H | 700 m | MPC · JPL |
| 382194 | 2012 LK_{21} | — | November 24, 2006 | Mount Lemmon | Mount Lemmon Survey | V | 690 m | MPC · JPL |
| 382195 | 2012 LY_{22} | — | July 11, 2004 | Anderson Mesa | LONEOS | EUN | 1.4 km | MPC · JPL |
| 382196 | 2012 MN_{7} | — | June 4, 2000 | Socorro | LINEAR | · | 2.2 km | MPC · JPL |
| 382197 | 2012 OO_{2} | — | February 10, 2002 | Socorro | LINEAR | · | 2.4 km | MPC · JPL |
| 382198 | 2012 OC_{3} | — | November 10, 2009 | Kitt Peak | Spacewatch | · | 1.5 km | MPC · JPL |
| 382199 | 2012 OC_{5} | — | November 24, 2008 | Kitt Peak | Spacewatch | · | 3.0 km | MPC · JPL |
| 382200 | 2012 OO_{5} | — | March 30, 2011 | Catalina | CSS | EUN | 2.1 km | MPC · JPL |

== 382201–382300 ==
back to top

| Designation | | | Discovery | | | Properties | | Ref |
| Permanent | Provisional | Named after | Date | Site | Discoverer(s) | Category | Diam. | Ref |
|---|---|---|---|---|---|---|---|---|
| 382201 | 2012 OY_{5} | — | July 13, 2004 | Siding Spring | SSS | MAR | 1.3 km | MPC · JPL |
| 382202 | 2012 PB_{3} | — | September 10, 2007 | Mount Lemmon | Mount Lemmon Survey | · | 1.9 km | MPC · JPL |
| 382203 | 2012 PC_{8} | — | June 7, 2010 | WISE | WISE | · | 4.3 km | MPC · JPL |
| 382204 | 2012 PF_{8} | — | September 13, 2007 | Catalina | CSS | · | 3.6 km | MPC · JPL |
| 382205 | 2012 PS_{11} | — | January 30, 2004 | Kitt Peak | Spacewatch | · | 5.3 km | MPC · JPL |
| 382206 | 2012 PH_{13} | — | April 10, 2005 | Kitt Peak | Spacewatch | · | 3.0 km | MPC · JPL |
| 382207 | 2012 PY_{14} | — | March 18, 2010 | Mount Lemmon | Mount Lemmon Survey | · | 3.7 km | MPC · JPL |
| 382208 | 2012 PA_{16} | — | December 18, 2004 | Mount Lemmon | Mount Lemmon Survey | · | 3.5 km | MPC · JPL |
| 382209 | 2012 PQ_{21} | — | October 16, 2007 | Catalina | CSS | · | 5.0 km | MPC · JPL |
| 382210 | 2012 PY_{22} | — | September 3, 2007 | Catalina | CSS | EOS | 2.1 km | MPC · JPL |
| 382211 | 2012 PQ_{25} | — | February 6, 2007 | Mount Lemmon | Mount Lemmon Survey | · | 1.5 km | MPC · JPL |
| 382212 | 2012 PK_{26} | — | October 14, 2007 | Catalina | CSS | · | 4.2 km | MPC · JPL |
| 382213 | 2012 PM_{33} | — | November 9, 2004 | Catalina | CSS | · | 2.4 km | MPC · JPL |
| 382214 | 2012 PE_{35} | — | January 23, 2006 | Kitt Peak | Spacewatch | · | 1.8 km | MPC · JPL |
| 382215 | 2012 PN_{36} | — | October 11, 2007 | Mount Lemmon | Mount Lemmon Survey | HYG | 3.1 km | MPC · JPL |
| 382216 | 2012 PO_{38} | — | October 24, 2005 | Mauna Kea | A. Boattini | GEF | 1.3 km | MPC · JPL |
| 382217 | 2012 PC_{42} | — | August 3, 2003 | Leyburn | W. K. Y. Yeung | · | 1.6 km | MPC · JPL |
| 382218 | 2012 QY_{19} | — | September 12, 2007 | Kitt Peak | Spacewatch | · | 2.9 km | MPC · JPL |
| 382219 | 2012 QE_{21} | — | March 4, 2005 | Catalina | CSS | · | 3.3 km | MPC · JPL |
| 382220 | 2012 QE_{30} | — | January 1, 2009 | Kitt Peak | Spacewatch | · | 3.6 km | MPC · JPL |
| 382221 | 2012 QD_{44} | — | October 3, 2008 | Kitt Peak | Spacewatch | AST | 1.9 km | MPC · JPL |
| 382222 | 2012 QV_{47} | — | April 25, 2007 | Kitt Peak | Spacewatch | · | 1.1 km | MPC · JPL |
| 382223 | 2012 QV_{50} | — | February 6, 2006 | Mount Lemmon | Mount Lemmon Survey | · | 3.0 km | MPC · JPL |
| 382224 | 2012 QZ_{51} | — | January 23, 2006 | Kitt Peak | Spacewatch | L5 | 10 km | MPC · JPL |
| 382225 | 2012 RN_{5} | — | September 16, 2003 | Kitt Peak | Spacewatch | · | 2.6 km | MPC · JPL |
| 382226 | 2012 RL_{10} | — | September 21, 2008 | Mount Lemmon | Mount Lemmon Survey | · | 2.4 km | MPC · JPL |
| 382227 | 2012 RA_{12} | — | January 16, 2004 | Kitt Peak | Spacewatch | · | 3.5 km | MPC · JPL |
| 382228 | 2012 RL_{13} | — | November 7, 2008 | Mount Lemmon | Mount Lemmon Survey | NEM | 2.3 km | MPC · JPL |
| 382229 | 2012 RW_{13} | — | March 8, 2005 | Mount Lemmon | Mount Lemmon Survey | · | 3.4 km | MPC · JPL |
| 382230 | 2012 RN_{18} | — | May 10, 2005 | Mount Lemmon | Mount Lemmon Survey | · | 3.0 km | MPC · JPL |
| 382231 | 2012 RH_{26} | — | October 23, 2003 | Kitt Peak | Spacewatch | · | 2.0 km | MPC · JPL |
| 382232 | 2012 RZ_{27} | — | January 19, 2004 | Kitt Peak | Spacewatch | · | 4.0 km | MPC · JPL |
| 382233 | 2012 RY_{28} | — | March 24, 2006 | Mount Lemmon | Mount Lemmon Survey | AGN | 1.3 km | MPC · JPL |
| 382234 | 2012 RE_{29} | — | September 20, 2001 | Socorro | LINEAR | · | 3.4 km | MPC · JPL |
| 382235 | 2012 RU_{30} | — | October 13, 2007 | Anderson Mesa | LONEOS | · | 4.9 km | MPC · JPL |
| 382236 | 2012 SM_{2} | — | October 7, 2007 | Kitt Peak | Spacewatch | · | 3.1 km | MPC · JPL |
| 382237 | 2012 SA_{4} | — | April 17, 1996 | Kitt Peak | Spacewatch | KOR | 1.8 km | MPC · JPL |
| 382238 Euphemus | 2012 SN_{9} | Euphemus | July 8, 2011 | Mayhill-ISON | L. Elenin | L5 | 10 km | MPC · JPL |
| 382239 | 2012 SR_{12} | — | March 25, 2006 | Mount Lemmon | Mount Lemmon Survey | NEM | 2.1 km | MPC · JPL |
| 382240 | 2012 SQ_{20} | — | October 21, 2007 | Mount Lemmon | Mount Lemmon Survey | · | 4.6 km | MPC · JPL |
| 382241 | 2012 SR_{28} | — | March 8, 2005 | Mount Lemmon | Mount Lemmon Survey | · | 2.1 km | MPC · JPL |
| 382242 | 2012 SP_{34} | — | September 13, 2007 | Mount Lemmon | Mount Lemmon Survey | · | 2.3 km | MPC · JPL |
| 382243 | 2012 SV_{39} | — | October 10, 2007 | Kitt Peak | Spacewatch | · | 2.7 km | MPC · JPL |
| 382244 | 2012 SM_{40} | — | April 22, 2004 | Kitt Peak | Spacewatch | CYB | 3.5 km | MPC · JPL |
| 382245 | 2012 SU_{51} | — | August 25, 2001 | Ondřejov | Ondřejov, Observatoř | · | 3.0 km | MPC · JPL |
| 382246 | 2012 SZ_{59} | — | August 19, 2006 | Kitt Peak | Spacewatch | · | 2.9 km | MPC · JPL |
| 382247 | 2012 TV_{3} | — | March 9, 2005 | Kitt Peak | Spacewatch | · | 3.5 km | MPC · JPL |
| 382248 | 2012 TY_{4} | — | April 12, 2010 | WISE | WISE | L5 | 8.6 km | MPC · JPL |
| 382249 | 2012 TO_{6} | — | November 15, 2003 | Kitt Peak | Spacewatch | AGN | 1.9 km | MPC · JPL |
| 382250 | 2012 TL_{16} | — | March 16, 2004 | Kitt Peak | Spacewatch | · | 4.2 km | MPC · JPL |
| 382251 | 2012 TJ_{25} | — | September 22, 2012 | Kitt Peak | Spacewatch | L5 | 9.3 km | MPC · JPL |
| 382252 | 2012 TE_{26} | — | November 19, 2007 | Kitt Peak | Spacewatch | · | 3.5 km | MPC · JPL |
| 382253 | 2012 TK_{26} | — | November 16, 2001 | Kitt Peak | Spacewatch | L5 | 9.7 km | MPC · JPL |
| 382254 | 2012 TV_{26} | — | December 17, 2003 | Kitt Peak | Spacewatch | (16286) | 3.1 km | MPC · JPL |
| 382255 | 2012 TC_{35} | — | February 4, 2006 | Kitt Peak | Spacewatch | L5 | 10 km | MPC · JPL |
| 382256 | 2012 TU_{53} | — | October 23, 2003 | Kitt Peak | Spacewatch | · | 2.3 km | MPC · JPL |
| 382257 | 2012 TK_{59} | — | December 16, 2007 | Mount Lemmon | Mount Lemmon Survey | CYB | 3.6 km | MPC · JPL |
| 382258 | 2012 TH_{67} | — | December 14, 2001 | Socorro | LINEAR | · | 4.3 km | MPC · JPL |
| 382259 | 2012 TR_{79} | — | August 20, 2011 | Haleakala | Pan-STARRS 1 | L5 | 8.5 km | MPC · JPL |
| 382260 | 2012 TP_{91} | — | October 25, 2005 | Kitt Peak | Spacewatch | 3:2 | 4.5 km | MPC · JPL |
| 382261 | 2012 TQ_{94} | — | December 4, 2007 | Catalina | CSS | · | 3.9 km | MPC · JPL |
| 382262 | 2012 TC_{114} | — | January 18, 2005 | La Silla | A. Boattini, H. Scholl | · | 2.3 km | MPC · JPL |
| 382263 | 2012 TM_{119} | — | September 28, 2006 | Mount Lemmon | Mount Lemmon Survey | VER | 4.1 km | MPC · JPL |
| 382264 | 2012 TO_{124} | — | August 29, 2011 | Haleakala | Pan-STARRS 1 | L5 | 6.8 km | MPC · JPL |
| 382265 | 2012 TF_{133} | — | March 2, 2006 | Kitt Peak | Spacewatch | L5 | 9.5 km | MPC · JPL |
| 382266 | 2012 TX_{134} | — | October 13, 2004 | Kitt Peak | Spacewatch | · | 1.8 km | MPC · JPL |
| 382267 | 2012 TT_{135} | — | December 20, 2004 | Mount Lemmon | Mount Lemmon Survey | · | 2.9 km | MPC · JPL |
| 382268 | 2012 TN_{147} | — | December 8, 2004 | Socorro | LINEAR | · | 2.6 km | MPC · JPL |
| 382269 | 2012 TC_{160} | — | December 9, 2004 | Kitt Peak | Spacewatch | MIS | 2.5 km | MPC · JPL |
| 382270 | 2012 TA_{174} | — | November 19, 2007 | Kitt Peak | Spacewatch | EOS | 5.2 km | MPC · JPL |
| 382271 | 2012 TM_{180} | — | April 14, 2010 | Catalina | CSS | · | 2.2 km | MPC · JPL |
| 382272 | 2012 TT_{181} | — | May 20, 1999 | Kitt Peak | Spacewatch | LIX | 2.7 km | MPC · JPL |
| 382273 | 2012 TQ_{197} | — | December 15, 2001 | Socorro | LINEAR | · | 4.8 km | MPC · JPL |
| 382274 | 2012 TE_{202} | — | April 16, 2004 | Kitt Peak | Spacewatch | · | 2.7 km | MPC · JPL |
| 382275 | 2012 TS_{204} | — | April 13, 2004 | Kitt Peak | Spacewatch | · | 3.0 km | MPC · JPL |
| 382276 | 2012 TO_{211} | — | October 3, 2003 | Kitt Peak | Spacewatch | MRX | 1.4 km | MPC · JPL |
| 382277 | 2012 TK_{218} | — | March 12, 2010 | Kitt Peak | Spacewatch | THM | 2.6 km | MPC · JPL |
| 382278 | 2012 TL_{221} | — | February 13, 2004 | Kitt Peak | Spacewatch | · | 3.4 km | MPC · JPL |
| 382279 | 2012 TY_{225} | — | March 20, 2004 | Socorro | LINEAR | EOS | 2.5 km | MPC · JPL |
| 382280 | 2012 TW_{255} | — | December 3, 2005 | Mauna Kea | A. Boattini | · | 1.9 km | MPC · JPL |
| 382281 | 2012 TC_{277} | — | October 9, 2007 | Mount Lemmon | Mount Lemmon Survey | LIX | 5.1 km | MPC · JPL |
| 382282 | 2012 TL_{291} | — | March 11, 2005 | Mount Lemmon | Mount Lemmon Survey | · | 2.5 km | MPC · JPL |
| 382283 | 2012 TJ_{297} | — | April 14, 2004 | Anderson Mesa | LONEOS | · | 1.2 km | MPC · JPL |
| 382284 | 2012 TN_{298} | — | March 17, 2004 | Kitt Peak | Spacewatch | · | 2.5 km | MPC · JPL |
| 382285 | 2012 TU_{305} | — | October 20, 2003 | Kitt Peak | Spacewatch | · | 2.2 km | MPC · JPL |
| 382286 | 2012 TE_{317} | — | September 24, 2006 | Anderson Mesa | LONEOS | · | 5.5 km | MPC · JPL |
| 382287 | 2012 TD_{322} | — | September 9, 2008 | Catalina | CSS | · | 2.1 km | MPC · JPL |
| 382288 | 2012 TN_{322} | — | December 18, 2007 | Kitt Peak | Spacewatch | · | 4.9 km | MPC · JPL |
| 382289 | 2012 UO_{3} | — | January 17, 2009 | Kitt Peak | Spacewatch | · | 1.9 km | MPC · JPL |
| 382290 | 2012 UJ_{36} | — | April 28, 2004 | Kitt Peak | Spacewatch | · | 3.6 km | MPC · JPL |
| 382291 | 2012 UQ_{61} | — | May 7, 2010 | WISE | WISE | L5 | 10 km | MPC · JPL |
| 382292 | 2012 UQ_{104} | — | September 17, 2006 | Catalina | CSS | · | 7.0 km | MPC · JPL |
| 382293 | 2012 UB_{111} | — | November 19, 2007 | Kitt Peak | Spacewatch | · | 3.0 km | MPC · JPL |
| 382294 | 2012 UN_{160} | — | September 12, 2001 | Kitt Peak | Spacewatch | · | 3.1 km | MPC · JPL |
| 382295 | 2012 UW_{168} | — | November 2, 2007 | Mount Lemmon | Mount Lemmon Survey | · | 3.4 km | MPC · JPL |
| 382296 | 2012 VD_{39} | — | September 5, 2007 | Catalina | CSS | · | 3.0 km | MPC · JPL |
| 382297 | 2012 VO_{43} | — | February 22, 2010 | WISE | WISE | · | 5.8 km | MPC · JPL |
| 382298 | 2012 VS_{47} | — | November 11, 2001 | Kitt Peak | Spacewatch | TIR | 4.0 km | MPC · JPL |
| 382299 | 2012 VJ_{65} | — | September 19, 2006 | Catalina | CSS | · | 3.0 km | MPC · JPL |
| 382300 | 2012 VP_{77} | — | April 19, 2006 | Kitt Peak | Spacewatch | · | 1.7 km | MPC · JPL |

== 382301–382400 ==
back to top

| Designation | | | Discovery | | | Properties | | Ref |
| Permanent | Provisional | Named after | Date | Site | Discoverer(s) | Category | Diam. | Ref |
|---|---|---|---|---|---|---|---|---|
| 382301 | 2012 VH_{97} | — | August 31, 2000 | Kitt Peak | Spacewatch | · | 4.6 km | MPC · JPL |
| 382302 | 2012 VZ_{112} | — | September 16, 2006 | Catalina | CSS | · | 3.0 km | MPC · JPL |
| 382303 | 2013 BO_{1} | — | December 23, 2000 | Kitt Peak | Spacewatch | L4 | 10 km | MPC · JPL |
| 382304 | 2013 OQ_{5} | — | September 25, 2009 | Catalina | CSS | EUN | 1.5 km | MPC · JPL |
| 382305 | 2013 PV | — | October 6, 2008 | Mount Lemmon | Mount Lemmon Survey | · | 2.9 km | MPC · JPL |
| 382306 | 2013 PL_{10} | — | September 23, 2008 | Mount Lemmon | Mount Lemmon Survey | · | 2.5 km | MPC · JPL |
| 382307 | 2013 PS_{10} | — | September 21, 2008 | Kitt Peak | Spacewatch | · | 2.8 km | MPC · JPL |
| 382308 | 2013 PD_{12} | — | December 15, 2004 | Socorro | LINEAR | · | 2.8 km | MPC · JPL |
| 382309 | 2013 PA_{34} | — | September 27, 2007 | Mount Lemmon | Mount Lemmon Survey | · | 4.9 km | MPC · JPL |
| 382310 | 2013 PG_{49} | — | December 19, 2004 | Mount Lemmon | Mount Lemmon Survey | · | 3.6 km | MPC · JPL |
| 382311 | 2013 QZ_{76} | — | December 25, 1998 | Kitt Peak | Spacewatch | · | 3.2 km | MPC · JPL |
| 382312 | 2013 RX_{32} | — | March 26, 2008 | Mount Lemmon | Mount Lemmon Survey | · | 1.5 km | MPC · JPL |
| 382313 | 2013 RS_{60} | — | October 22, 2009 | Mount Lemmon | Mount Lemmon Survey | · | 2.1 km | MPC · JPL |
| 382314 | 2013 RK_{63} | — | May 13, 2005 | Mount Lemmon | Mount Lemmon Survey | MAS | 830 m | MPC · JPL |
| 382315 | 2013 RO_{85} | — | December 27, 2000 | Kitt Peak | Spacewatch | MRX | 1.2 km | MPC · JPL |
| 382316 | 2013 RK_{97} | — | November 11, 2004 | Kitt Peak | Spacewatch | AGN | 1.4 km | MPC · JPL |
| 382317 | 2013 SH_{27} | — | April 14, 2005 | Kitt Peak | Spacewatch | · | 4.0 km | MPC · JPL |
| 382318 | 2013 SX_{29} | — | August 28, 2006 | Catalina | CSS | · | 740 m | MPC · JPL |
| 382319 | 2013 SL_{39} | — | March 10, 2007 | Kitt Peak | Spacewatch | · | 2.0 km | MPC · JPL |
| 382320 | 2013 SS_{51} | — | November 25, 2006 | Mount Lemmon | Mount Lemmon Survey | · | 760 m | MPC · JPL |
| 382321 | 2013 TR_{2} | — | November 11, 2004 | Kitt Peak | Spacewatch | · | 3.9 km | MPC · JPL |
| 382322 | 2013 TT_{2} | — | October 8, 2007 | Catalina | CSS | · | 4.7 km | MPC · JPL |
| 382323 | 2013 TW_{3} | — | April 11, 2007 | Kitt Peak | Spacewatch | · | 3.8 km | MPC · JPL |
| 382324 | 2013 TM_{7} | — | April 6, 2011 | Mount Lemmon | Mount Lemmon Survey | · | 2.4 km | MPC · JPL |
| 382325 | 2013 TH_{9} | — | September 8, 2007 | Anderson Mesa | LONEOS | · | 3.8 km | MPC · JPL |
| 382326 | 2013 TA_{12} | — | October 8, 2004 | Socorro | LINEAR | · | 2.7 km | MPC · JPL |
| 382327 | 2013 TH_{28} | — | February 25, 2006 | Kitt Peak | Spacewatch | · | 2.2 km | MPC · JPL |
| 382328 | 2013 TQ_{28} | — | April 10, 2005 | Kitt Peak | Spacewatch | · | 3.7 km | MPC · JPL |
| 382329 | 2013 TX_{29} | — | October 10, 1999 | Socorro | LINEAR | · | 2.8 km | MPC · JPL |
| 382330 | 2013 TY_{29} | — | September 25, 2008 | Mount Lemmon | Mount Lemmon Survey | · | 2.2 km | MPC · JPL |
| 382331 | 2013 TF_{30} | — | September 8, 2000 | Kitt Peak | Spacewatch | · | 1.4 km | MPC · JPL |
| 382332 | 2013 TP_{30} | — | September 19, 1995 | Kitt Peak | Spacewatch | · | 1.6 km | MPC · JPL |
| 382333 | 2013 TT_{30} | — | September 12, 2007 | Catalina | CSS | · | 3.8 km | MPC · JPL |
| 382334 | 2013 TZ_{31} | — | November 11, 2006 | Kitt Peak | Spacewatch | MAS | 820 m | MPC · JPL |
| 382335 | 2013 TT_{32} | — | November 27, 2009 | Mount Lemmon | Mount Lemmon Survey | · | 3.0 km | MPC · JPL |
| 382336 | 2013 TV_{32} | — | October 12, 1998 | Kitt Peak | Spacewatch | · | 1.1 km | MPC · JPL |
| 382337 | 2013 TC_{33} | — | March 6, 2011 | Mount Lemmon | Mount Lemmon Survey | · | 1.8 km | MPC · JPL |
| 382338 | 2013 TA_{39} | — | October 13, 1998 | Kitt Peak | Spacewatch | KOR | 1.1 km | MPC · JPL |
| 382339 | 2013 TW_{50} | — | November 19, 2009 | Kitt Peak | Spacewatch | · | 1.8 km | MPC · JPL |
| 382340 | 2013 TB_{51} | — | February 1, 2006 | Mount Lemmon | Mount Lemmon Survey | · | 1.7 km | MPC · JPL |
| 382341 | 2013 TZ_{52} | — | September 20, 2003 | Kitt Peak | Spacewatch | · | 1.0 km | MPC · JPL |
| 382342 | 2013 TN_{53} | — | January 16, 2005 | Kitt Peak | Spacewatch | · | 2.1 km | MPC · JPL |
| 382343 | 2013 TT_{53} | — | October 4, 2004 | Kitt Peak | Spacewatch | · | 2.0 km | MPC · JPL |
| 382344 | 2013 TW_{55} | — | April 14, 2004 | Bergisch Gladbach | W. Bickel | · | 5.3 km | MPC · JPL |
| 382345 | 2013 TH_{62} | — | February 20, 2006 | Kitt Peak | Spacewatch | · | 3.1 km | MPC · JPL |
| 382346 | 2013 TJ_{65} | — | August 8, 2004 | Socorro | LINEAR | · | 1.8 km | MPC · JPL |
| 382347 | 2013 TN_{71} | — | September 29, 2008 | Mount Lemmon | Mount Lemmon Survey | EOS | 2.2 km | MPC · JPL |
| 382348 | 2013 TC_{73} | — | September 14, 2006 | Catalina | CSS | · | 660 m | MPC · JPL |
| 382349 | 2013 TM_{73} | — | October 9, 2004 | Anderson Mesa | LONEOS | EUN · slow | 1.6 km | MPC · JPL |
| 382350 | 2013 TM_{75} | — | September 22, 2009 | Mount Lemmon | Mount Lemmon Survey | · | 3.4 km | MPC · JPL |
| 382351 | 2013 TS_{75} | — | September 9, 1996 | Kitt Peak | Spacewatch | · | 3.3 km | MPC · JPL |
| 382352 | 2013 TF_{76} | — | June 14, 2007 | Kitt Peak | Spacewatch | · | 2.0 km | MPC · JPL |
| 382353 | 2013 TQ_{76} | — | December 13, 2006 | Kitt Peak | Spacewatch | · | 1.3 km | MPC · JPL |
| 382354 | 2013 TT_{78} | — | September 27, 2009 | Kitt Peak | Spacewatch | · | 1.8 km | MPC · JPL |
| 382355 | 2013 TJ_{84} | — | April 10, 2005 | Kitt Peak | Spacewatch | · | 3.4 km | MPC · JPL |
| 382356 | 2013 TO_{84} | — | October 4, 2004 | Kitt Peak | Spacewatch | · | 2.1 km | MPC · JPL |
| 382357 | 2013 TP_{89} | — | October 7, 2004 | Kitt Peak | Spacewatch | HOF | 2.8 km | MPC · JPL |
| 382358 | 2013 TZ_{89} | — | February 16, 2004 | Socorro | LINEAR | · | 3.3 km | MPC · JPL |
| 382359 | 2013 TO_{93} | — | February 16, 2001 | Kitt Peak | Spacewatch | AST | 2.0 km | MPC · JPL |
| 382360 | 2013 TP_{93} | — | September 1, 2003 | Socorro | LINEAR | · | 660 m | MPC · JPL |
| 382361 | 2013 TR_{94} | — | July 5, 2005 | Mount Lemmon | Mount Lemmon Survey | · | 1.2 km | MPC · JPL |
| 382362 | 2013 TS_{94} | — | May 22, 2006 | Kitt Peak | Spacewatch | · | 2.8 km | MPC · JPL |
| 382363 | 2013 TT_{94} | — | August 25, 2003 | Socorro | LINEAR | · | 600 m | MPC · JPL |
| 382364 | 2013 TZ_{94} | — | October 3, 2008 | Mount Lemmon | Mount Lemmon Survey | · | 2.5 km | MPC · JPL |
| 382365 | 2013 TD_{98} | — | March 3, 2006 | Kitt Peak | Spacewatch | · | 2.0 km | MPC · JPL |
| 382366 | 2013 TP_{98} | — | October 25, 2005 | Catalina | CSS | · | 1.2 km | MPC · JPL |
| 382367 | 2013 TT_{98} | — | July 23, 1993 | Kitt Peak | Spacewatch | · | 890 m | MPC · JPL |
| 382368 | 2013 TX_{98} | — | December 10, 2004 | Kitt Peak | Spacewatch | · | 2.2 km | MPC · JPL |
| 382369 | 2013 TZ_{98} | — | March 31, 2008 | Mount Lemmon | Mount Lemmon Survey | · | 1.2 km | MPC · JPL |
| 382370 | 2013 TF_{99} | — | January 27, 2007 | Mount Lemmon | Mount Lemmon Survey | · | 1.4 km | MPC · JPL |
| 382371 | 2013 TU_{101} | — | February 22, 2006 | Mount Lemmon | Mount Lemmon Survey | GEF | 1.5 km | MPC · JPL |
| 382372 | 2013 TU_{102} | — | October 11, 2004 | Kitt Peak | Spacewatch | · | 1.9 km | MPC · JPL |
| 382373 | 2013 TY_{103} | — | February 10, 2011 | Mount Lemmon | Mount Lemmon Survey | AEO | 1.3 km | MPC · JPL |
| 382374 | 2013 TV_{107} | — | October 20, 2006 | Mount Lemmon | Mount Lemmon Survey | · | 1.3 km | MPC · JPL |
| 382375 | 2013 TB_{108} | — | January 28, 2007 | Mount Lemmon | Mount Lemmon Survey | MAS | 690 m | MPC · JPL |
| 382376 | 2013 TO_{109} | — | September 20, 2009 | Mount Lemmon | Mount Lemmon Survey | · | 1.8 km | MPC · JPL |
| 382377 | 2013 TB_{110} | — | February 2, 1997 | Kitt Peak | Spacewatch | NEM | 2.7 km | MPC · JPL |
| 382378 | 2013 TW_{113} | — | March 24, 2006 | Kitt Peak | Spacewatch | · | 2.7 km | MPC · JPL |
| 382379 | 2013 TA_{115} | — | November 26, 2009 | Catalina | CSS | · | 2.0 km | MPC · JPL |
| 382380 | 2013 TE_{120} | — | November 3, 2000 | Socorro | LINEAR | · | 1.9 km | MPC · JPL |
| 382381 | 2013 TU_{121} | — | September 28, 2003 | Kitt Peak | Spacewatch | · | 590 m | MPC · JPL |
| 382382 | 2013 TA_{122} | — | October 9, 2004 | Kitt Peak | Spacewatch | · | 1.8 km | MPC · JPL |
| 382383 | 2013 TE_{122} | — | April 12, 2005 | Mount Lemmon | Mount Lemmon Survey | · | 3.4 km | MPC · JPL |
| 382384 | 2013 TF_{122} | — | May 7, 2005 | Mount Lemmon | Mount Lemmon Survey | · | 2.9 km | MPC · JPL |
| 382385 | 2013 TR_{122} | — | October 3, 1999 | Kitt Peak | Spacewatch | · | 2.6 km | MPC · JPL |
| 382386 | 2013 TX_{124} | — | June 17, 2005 | Mount Lemmon | Mount Lemmon Survey | NYS | 1.5 km | MPC · JPL |
| 382387 | 2013 TY_{126} | — | February 13, 2004 | Kitt Peak | Spacewatch | · | 3.7 km | MPC · JPL |
| 382388 | 2013 TP_{127} | — | October 16, 1977 | Palomar | C. J. van Houten, I. van Houten-Groeneveld, T. Gehrels | · | 1.7 km | MPC · JPL |
| 382389 | 2013 TL_{129} | — | December 4, 2008 | Kitt Peak | Spacewatch | · | 4.4 km | MPC · JPL |
| 382390 | 2013 TC_{130} | — | March 30, 2012 | Kitt Peak | Spacewatch | · | 1.6 km | MPC · JPL |
| 382391 | 2013 TS_{136} | — | September 24, 2000 | Socorro | LINEAR | · | 710 m | MPC · JPL |
| 382392 | 2013 TT_{144} | — | December 19, 2003 | Kitt Peak | Spacewatch | THM | 2.7 km | MPC · JPL |
| 382393 | 2013 VX_{11} | — | January 30, 2009 | Catalina | CSS | H | 710 m | MPC · JPL |
| 382394 | 3549 P-L | — | October 17, 1960 | Palomar | C. J. van Houten, I. van Houten-Groeneveld, T. Gehrels | · | 1.9 km | MPC · JPL |
| 382395 | 1990 SM | — | September 22, 1990 | Siding Spring | R. H. McNaught, McKenzie, P. | APO +1km · PHA | 1.9 km | MPC · JPL |
| 382396 | 1991 TB_{16} | — | October 6, 1991 | Palomar | Lowe, A. | · | 1.1 km | MPC · JPL |
| 382397 | 1991 VH_{8} | — | November 4, 1991 | Kitt Peak | Spacewatch | · | 1.7 km | MPC · JPL |
| 382398 | 1994 SU_{8} | — | September 28, 1994 | Kitt Peak | Spacewatch | · | 950 m | MPC · JPL |
| 382399 | 1994 SB_{10} | — | September 28, 1994 | Kitt Peak | Spacewatch | · | 1.9 km | MPC · JPL |
| 382400 | 1994 SJ_{10} | — | September 28, 1994 | Kitt Peak | Spacewatch | · | 1.1 km | MPC · JPL |

== 382401–382500 ==
back to top

| Designation | | | Discovery | | | Properties | | Ref |
| Permanent | Provisional | Named after | Date | Site | Discoverer(s) | Category | Diam. | Ref |
|---|---|---|---|---|---|---|---|---|
| 382401 | 1994 UK_{3} | — | October 26, 1994 | Kitt Peak | Spacewatch | MAS | 700 m | MPC · JPL |
| 382402 | 1995 PR | — | August 4, 1995 | Haleakala | AMOS | V | 990 m | MPC · JPL |
| 382403 | 1995 SN_{43} | — | September 25, 1995 | Kitt Peak | Spacewatch | · | 680 m | MPC · JPL |
| 382404 | 1995 SK_{72} | — | September 20, 1995 | Kitt Peak | Spacewatch | THB | 2.9 km | MPC · JPL |
| 382405 | 1995 WQ_{24} | — | November 18, 1995 | Kitt Peak | Spacewatch | · | 1.6 km | MPC · JPL |
| 382406 | 1996 AJ_{1} | — | January 12, 1996 | Kitt Peak | Spacewatch | APO · PHA | 270 m | MPC · JPL |
| 382407 | 1996 TE_{5} | — | October 8, 1996 | Prescott | P. G. Comba | · | 3.4 km | MPC · JPL |
| 382408 | 1996 TJ_{45} | — | October 7, 1996 | Kitt Peak | Spacewatch | (5) | 1.5 km | MPC · JPL |
| 382409 | 1996 TJ_{46} | — | October 10, 1996 | Kitt Peak | Spacewatch | · | 2.1 km | MPC · JPL |
| 382410 | 1996 VF_{18} | — | November 6, 1996 | Kitt Peak | Spacewatch | THM | 1.9 km | MPC · JPL |
| 382411 | 1997 EP_{8} | — | March 2, 1997 | Kitt Peak | Spacewatch | · | 3.6 km | MPC · JPL |
| 382412 | 1997 SZ_{3} | — | September 25, 1997 | Pianoro | V. Goretti | · | 1.7 km | MPC · JPL |
| 382413 | 1997 WT_{12} | — | November 23, 1997 | Kitt Peak | Spacewatch | · | 1.2 km | MPC · JPL |
| 382414 | 1998 BC_{39} | — | January 29, 1998 | Kitt Peak | Spacewatch | · | 2.7 km | MPC · JPL |
| 382415 | 1998 FJ_{124} | — | March 24, 1998 | Socorro | LINEAR | · | 1.5 km | MPC · JPL |
| 382416 | 1998 KU_{11} | — | May 23, 1998 | Kitt Peak | Spacewatch | · | 1.9 km | MPC · JPL |
| 382417 | 1998 OF_{9} | — | July 26, 1998 | La Silla | E. W. Elst | NYS | 1.3 km | MPC · JPL |
| 382418 | 1998 QN | — | August 17, 1998 | Socorro | LINEAR | · | 1.7 km | MPC · JPL |
| 382419 | 1998 RQ_{9} | — | September 13, 1998 | Kitt Peak | Spacewatch | · | 800 m | MPC · JPL |
| 382420 | 1998 RC_{13} | — | September 14, 1998 | Kitt Peak | Spacewatch | · | 920 m | MPC · JPL |
| 382421 | 1998 SJ_{53} | — | September 30, 1998 | Kitt Peak | Spacewatch | · | 910 m | MPC · JPL |
| 382422 | 1998 TZ_{3} | — | October 12, 1998 | Kitt Peak | Spacewatch | · | 940 m | MPC · JPL |
| 382423 | 1998 TM_{27} | — | October 15, 1998 | Kitt Peak | Spacewatch | NYS | 880 m | MPC · JPL |
| 382424 | 1998 VS_{3} | — | November 10, 1998 | Caussols | ODAS | MAS | 760 m | MPC · JPL |
| 382425 | 1998 YQ_{21} | — | December 26, 1998 | Kitt Peak | Spacewatch | · | 1.3 km | MPC · JPL |
| 382426 | 1999 AO_{14} | — | January 8, 1999 | Kitt Peak | Spacewatch | · | 1.1 km | MPC · JPL |
| 382427 | 1999 CF_{3} | — | February 9, 1999 | Cloudcroft | W. Offutt | · | 1.6 km | MPC · JPL |
| 382428 | 1999 CR_{11} | — | February 12, 1999 | Socorro | LINEAR | · | 2.4 km | MPC · JPL |
| 382429 | 1999 FD_{73} | — | March 20, 1999 | Apache Point | SDSS | NYS · | 1.1 km | MPC · JPL |
| 382430 | 1999 RG_{41} | — | September 13, 1999 | Socorro | LINEAR | PHO | 1.2 km | MPC · JPL |
| 382431 | 1999 RO_{102} | — | September 8, 1999 | Socorro | LINEAR | · | 2.3 km | MPC · JPL |
| 382432 | 1999 RY_{187} | — | September 9, 1999 | Socorro | LINEAR | · | 1.8 km | MPC · JPL |
| 382433 | 1999 TZ_{51} | — | October 4, 1999 | Kitt Peak | Spacewatch | · | 1.7 km | MPC · JPL |
| 382434 | 1999 TD_{72} | — | October 9, 1999 | Kitt Peak | Spacewatch | · | 1.4 km | MPC · JPL |
| 382435 | 1999 TW_{125} | — | October 4, 1999 | Socorro | LINEAR | · | 740 m | MPC · JPL |
| 382436 | 1999 TA_{188} | — | October 12, 1999 | Socorro | LINEAR | · | 1.9 km | MPC · JPL |
| 382437 | 1999 TF_{212} | — | October 15, 1999 | Socorro | LINEAR | · | 2.5 km | MPC · JPL |
| 382438 | 1999 TK_{271} | — | October 3, 1999 | Socorro | LINEAR | · | 1.0 km | MPC · JPL |
| 382439 | 1999 TA_{316} | — | October 9, 1999 | Kitt Peak | Spacewatch | · | 1.6 km | MPC · JPL |
| 382440 | 1999 VV_{14} | — | November 2, 1999 | Kitt Peak | Spacewatch | · | 1.7 km | MPC · JPL |
| 382441 | 1999 VF_{181} | — | November 9, 1999 | Socorro | LINEAR | · | 680 m | MPC · JPL |
| 382442 | 1999 VV_{214} | — | November 1, 1999 | Kitt Peak | Spacewatch | WIT | 1.3 km | MPC · JPL |
| 382443 | 1999 XV_{112} | — | December 11, 1999 | Socorro | LINEAR | · | 4.2 km | MPC · JPL |
| 382444 | 1999 YK_{2} | — | December 16, 1999 | Kitt Peak | Spacewatch | MRX | 1.0 km | MPC · JPL |
| 382445 | 1999 YB_{14} | — | December 31, 1999 | Kitt Peak | Spacewatch | · | 710 m | MPC · JPL |
| 382446 | 2000 BW_{27} | — | January 30, 2000 | Socorro | LINEAR | PHO | 1.5 km | MPC · JPL |
| 382447 | 2000 DZ_{36} | — | February 25, 2000 | Catalina | CSS | · | 2.5 km | MPC · JPL |
| 382448 | 2000 KU_{1} | — | May 26, 2000 | Prescott | P. G. Comba | · | 1.1 km | MPC · JPL |
| 382449 | 2000 NH_{1} | — | July 3, 2000 | Kitt Peak | Spacewatch | EOS | 2.2 km | MPC · JPL |
| 382450 | 2000 OT_{30} | — | July 30, 2000 | Socorro | LINEAR | · | 4.7 km | MPC · JPL |
| 382451 | 2000 PJ_{27} | — | August 3, 2000 | Kitt Peak | Spacewatch | HYG | 3.2 km | MPC · JPL |
| 382452 | 2000 QS_{9} | — | August 24, 2000 | Bergisch Gladbach | W. Bickel | EUN | 1.3 km | MPC · JPL |
| 382453 | 2000 QY_{15} | — | August 24, 2000 | Socorro | LINEAR | (5) | 1.6 km | MPC · JPL |
| 382454 | 2000 QX_{67} | — | August 28, 2000 | Socorro | LINEAR | · | 3.8 km | MPC · JPL |
| 382455 | 2000 QD_{68} | — | August 28, 2000 | Socorro | LINEAR | · | 1.4 km | MPC · JPL |
| 382456 | 2000 QV_{84} | — | August 25, 2000 | Socorro | LINEAR | · | 1.8 km | MPC · JPL |
| 382457 | 2000 QO_{122} | — | August 25, 2000 | Socorro | LINEAR | · | 1.8 km | MPC · JPL |
| 382458 | 2000 RV_{74} | — | September 3, 2000 | Socorro | LINEAR | · | 1.1 km | MPC · JPL |
| 382459 | 2000 ST_{20} | — | September 23, 2000 | Socorro | LINEAR | AMO | 450 m | MPC · JPL |
| 382460 | 2000 SX_{47} | — | September 23, 2000 | Socorro | LINEAR | · | 1.7 km | MPC · JPL |
| 382461 | 2000 SS_{66} | — | September 24, 2000 | Socorro | LINEAR | (5) | 1.4 km | MPC · JPL |
| 382462 | 2000 SM_{89} | — | September 28, 2000 | Socorro | LINEAR | (5) | 1.4 km | MPC · JPL |
| 382463 | 2000 SG_{90} | — | September 22, 2000 | Socorro | LINEAR | · | 1.7 km | MPC · JPL |
| 382464 | 2000 SA_{95} | — | September 23, 2000 | Socorro | LINEAR | (5) | 1.2 km | MPC · JPL |
| 382465 | 2000 SX_{199} | — | September 24, 2000 | Socorro | LINEAR | · | 1.1 km | MPC · JPL |
| 382466 | 2000 SW_{223} | — | September 27, 2000 | Socorro | LINEAR | · | 1.5 km | MPC · JPL |
| 382467 | 2000 SF_{279} | — | September 30, 2000 | Socorro | LINEAR | · | 1.7 km | MPC · JPL |
| 382468 | 2000 SW_{302} | — | September 28, 2000 | Socorro | LINEAR | (5) | 1.3 km | MPC · JPL |
| 382469 | 2000 TQ_{23} | — | September 21, 2000 | Kitt Peak | Spacewatch | · | 750 m | MPC · JPL |
| 382470 | 2000 TO_{26} | — | October 2, 2000 | Socorro | LINEAR | · | 1.5 km | MPC · JPL |
| 382471 | 2000 US_{19} | — | October 31, 2000 | Oaxaca | Roe, J. M. | RAF | 1.3 km | MPC · JPL |
| 382472 | 2000 UY_{29} | — | October 25, 2000 | Socorro | LINEAR | · | 1.7 km | MPC · JPL |
| 382473 | 2000 UN_{52} | — | October 24, 2000 | Socorro | LINEAR | · | 3.4 km | MPC · JPL |
| 382474 | 2000 VF_{58} | — | November 3, 2000 | Socorro | LINEAR | · | 2.2 km | MPC · JPL |
| 382475 | 2000 WG_{116} | — | November 20, 2000 | Socorro | LINEAR | · | 1.9 km | MPC · JPL |
| 382476 | 2000 WC_{190} | — | November 18, 2000 | Anderson Mesa | LONEOS | · | 1.2 km | MPC · JPL |
| 382477 | 2000 WA_{192} | — | November 19, 2000 | Anderson Mesa | LONEOS | · | 2.2 km | MPC · JPL |
| 382478 | 2000 XB_{37} | — | December 5, 2000 | Socorro | LINEAR | · | 1.8 km | MPC · JPL |
| 382479 | 2000 XM_{40} | — | December 5, 2000 | Socorro | LINEAR | · | 1.9 km | MPC · JPL |
| 382480 | 2000 YD_{1} | — | December 16, 2000 | Kitt Peak | Spacewatch | · | 2.5 km | MPC · JPL |
| 382481 | 2000 YT_{4} | — | December 20, 2000 | Kitt Peak | Spacewatch | · | 2.1 km | MPC · JPL |
| 382482 | 2001 AF_{6} | — | January 2, 2001 | Socorro | LINEAR | · | 2.1 km | MPC · JPL |
| 382483 | 2001 AK_{17} | — | January 2, 2001 | Socorro | LINEAR | · | 2.1 km | MPC · JPL |
| 382484 | 2001 AO_{25} | — | January 5, 2001 | Socorro | LINEAR | · | 1.2 km | MPC · JPL |
| 382485 | 2001 BL_{3} | — | January 17, 2001 | Socorro | LINEAR | H | 610 m | MPC · JPL |
| 382486 | 2001 CX_{19} | — | February 3, 2001 | Prescott | P. G. Comba | · | 2.5 km | MPC · JPL |
| 382487 | 2001 DQ_{58} | — | February 18, 2001 | Haleakala | NEAT | H | 680 m | MPC · JPL |
| 382488 | 2001 DE_{79} | — | February 22, 2001 | Socorro | LINEAR | · | 3.8 km | MPC · JPL |
| 382489 | 2001 FW_{108} | — | March 18, 2001 | Socorro | LINEAR | · | 2.2 km | MPC · JPL |
| 382490 | 2001 GU_{8} | — | February 16, 2001 | Socorro | LINEAR | · | 1.1 km | MPC · JPL |
| 382491 | 2001 NW_{17} | — | July 3, 2001 | Haleakala | NEAT | H | 830 m | MPC · JPL |
| 382492 | 2001 OQ_{16} | — | July 22, 2001 | Palomar | NEAT | · | 1.6 km | MPC · JPL |
| 382493 | 2001 PF_{10} | — | August 8, 2001 | Haleakala | NEAT | NYS | 1.3 km | MPC · JPL |
| 382494 | 2001 PX_{45} | — | August 12, 2001 | Palomar | NEAT | H | 680 m | MPC · JPL |
| 382495 | 2001 QH_{1} | — | August 16, 2001 | Socorro | LINEAR | · | 1.8 km | MPC · JPL |
| 382496 | 2001 QX_{110} | — | August 24, 2001 | Ondřejov | P. Kušnirák, P. Pravec | · | 1.3 km | MPC · JPL |
| 382497 | 2001 QT_{129} | — | August 20, 2001 | Socorro | LINEAR | · | 1.5 km | MPC · JPL |
| 382498 | 2001 QM_{150} | — | August 26, 2001 | Prescott | P. G. Comba | NYS | 1.3 km | MPC · JPL |
| 382499 | 2001 QV_{175} | — | August 23, 2001 | Kitt Peak | Spacewatch | MAS | 790 m | MPC · JPL |
| 382500 | 2001 QV_{214} | — | August 23, 2001 | Anderson Mesa | LONEOS | MAS | 750 m | MPC · JPL |

== 382501–382600 ==
back to top

| Designation | | | Discovery | | | Properties | | Ref |
| Permanent | Provisional | Named after | Date | Site | Discoverer(s) | Category | Diam. | Ref |
|---|---|---|---|---|---|---|---|---|
| 382501 | 2001 QW_{280} | — | August 19, 2001 | Socorro | LINEAR | · | 1.7 km | MPC · JPL |
| 382502 | 2001 RR_{5} | — | September 9, 2001 | Desert Eagle | W. K. Y. Yeung | · | 2.9 km | MPC · JPL |
| 382503 | 2001 RE_{8} | — | September 8, 2001 | Socorro | LINEAR | AMO | 510 m | MPC · JPL |
| 382504 | 2001 RP_{19} | — | September 7, 2001 | Socorro | LINEAR | · | 1.2 km | MPC · JPL |
| 382505 | 2001 RF_{56} | — | September 12, 2001 | Socorro | LINEAR | · | 2.8 km | MPC · JPL |
| 382506 | 2001 RU_{127} | — | September 12, 2001 | Socorro | LINEAR | · | 1.3 km | MPC · JPL |
| 382507 | 2001 SN_{1} | — | September 17, 2001 | Desert Eagle | W. K. Y. Yeung | · | 1.4 km | MPC · JPL |
| 382508 | 2001 SX_{7} | — | September 18, 2001 | Kitt Peak | Spacewatch | · | 2.6 km | MPC · JPL |
| 382509 | 2001 SC_{14} | — | September 16, 2001 | Socorro | LINEAR | · | 1.1 km | MPC · JPL |
| 382510 | 2001 SK_{18} | — | September 16, 2001 | Socorro | LINEAR | V | 880 m | MPC · JPL |
| 382511 | 2001 SV_{24} | — | September 16, 2001 | Socorro | LINEAR | · | 1.3 km | MPC · JPL |
| 382512 | 2001 SL_{30} | — | September 16, 2001 | Socorro | LINEAR | MAS | 790 m | MPC · JPL |
| 382513 | 2001 SR_{89} | — | September 20, 2001 | Socorro | LINEAR | HYG | 2.8 km | MPC · JPL |
| 382514 | 2001 ST_{102} | — | September 20, 2001 | Socorro | LINEAR | THB | 3.7 km | MPC · JPL |
| 382515 | 2001 SQ_{103} | — | September 20, 2001 | Socorro | LINEAR | · | 1.1 km | MPC · JPL |
| 382516 | 2001 SE_{123} | — | September 16, 2001 | Socorro | LINEAR | · | 1.5 km | MPC · JPL |
| 382517 | 2001 SY_{127} | — | September 16, 2001 | Socorro | LINEAR | NYS | 1.2 km | MPC · JPL |
| 382518 | 2001 SG_{156} | — | September 17, 2001 | Socorro | LINEAR | · | 1.3 km | MPC · JPL |
| 382519 | 2001 SO_{172} | — | September 16, 2001 | Socorro | LINEAR | MAS | 900 m | MPC · JPL |
| 382520 | 2001 SZ_{173} | — | September 16, 2001 | Socorro | LINEAR | · | 1.4 km | MPC · JPL |
| 382521 | 2001 SB_{190} | — | September 19, 2001 | Socorro | LINEAR | · | 1.2 km | MPC · JPL |
| 382522 | 2001 SS_{212} | — | September 19, 2001 | Socorro | LINEAR | NYS | 1.4 km | MPC · JPL |
| 382523 | 2001 SZ_{227} | — | September 19, 2001 | Socorro | LINEAR | · | 1.0 km | MPC · JPL |
| 382524 | 2001 SA_{230} | — | September 19, 2001 | Socorro | LINEAR | NYS | 1.3 km | MPC · JPL |
| 382525 | 2001 SU_{247} | — | September 19, 2001 | Socorro | LINEAR | · | 1.4 km | MPC · JPL |
| 382526 | 2001 SY_{264} | — | September 25, 2001 | Desert Eagle | W. K. Y. Yeung | · | 1.2 km | MPC · JPL |
| 382527 | 2001 SN_{269} | — | September 19, 2001 | Kitt Peak | Spacewatch | MAS | 690 m | MPC · JPL |
| 382528 | 2001 SU_{303} | — | September 20, 2001 | Socorro | LINEAR | · | 1.1 km | MPC · JPL |
| 382529 | 2001 SE_{313} | — | September 21, 2001 | Socorro | LINEAR | · | 680 m | MPC · JPL |
| 382530 | 2001 SG_{332} | — | September 19, 2001 | Kitt Peak | Spacewatch | · | 1.1 km | MPC · JPL |
| 382531 | 2001 TK_{47} | — | October 14, 2001 | Cima Ekar | ADAS | · | 1.5 km | MPC · JPL |
| 382532 | 2001 TA_{53} | — | October 13, 2001 | Socorro | LINEAR | MAS | 790 m | MPC · JPL |
| 382533 | 2001 TZ_{57} | — | October 13, 2001 | Socorro | LINEAR | · | 1.2 km | MPC · JPL |
| 382534 | 2001 TM_{147} | — | October 10, 2001 | Palomar | NEAT | · | 1.4 km | MPC · JPL |
| 382535 | 2001 TM_{156} | — | October 14, 2001 | Kitt Peak | Spacewatch | · | 1.6 km | MPC · JPL |
| 382536 | 2001 TR_{158} | — | October 11, 2001 | Palomar | NEAT | MAS | 860 m | MPC · JPL |
| 382537 | 2001 TF_{159} | — | October 11, 2001 | Palomar | NEAT | NYS | 1.1 km | MPC · JPL |
| 382538 | 2001 TP_{173} | — | October 14, 2001 | Socorro | LINEAR | · | 3.1 km | MPC · JPL |
| 382539 | 2001 TM_{178} | — | October 14, 2001 | Socorro | LINEAR | · | 1.5 km | MPC · JPL |
| 382540 | 2001 TS_{223} | — | October 14, 2001 | Socorro | LINEAR | · | 3.3 km | MPC · JPL |
| 382541 | 2001 TG_{239} | — | October 15, 2001 | Palomar | NEAT | V | 770 m | MPC · JPL |
| 382542 | 2001 UJ_{28} | — | October 16, 2001 | Socorro | LINEAR | NYS | 1.3 km | MPC · JPL |
| 382543 | 2001 UH_{41} | — | October 17, 2001 | Socorro | LINEAR | · | 1.5 km | MPC · JPL |
| 382544 | 2001 UY_{79} | — | October 20, 2001 | Socorro | LINEAR | · | 1.4 km | MPC · JPL |
| 382545 | 2001 UF_{106} | — | October 20, 2001 | Socorro | LINEAR | · | 1.1 km | MPC · JPL |
| 382546 | 2001 UR_{126} | — | October 17, 2001 | Socorro | LINEAR | · | 2.8 km | MPC · JPL |
| 382547 | 2001 UQ_{129} | — | October 20, 2001 | Socorro | LINEAR | · | 4.8 km | MPC · JPL |
| 382548 | 2001 UP_{182} | — | October 16, 2001 | Socorro | LINEAR | · | 1.4 km | MPC · JPL |
| 382549 | 2001 UK_{186} | — | October 17, 2001 | Socorro | LINEAR | · | 3.3 km | MPC · JPL |
| 382550 | 2001 UP_{209} | — | October 20, 2001 | Palomar | NEAT | · | 1.3 km | MPC · JPL |
| 382551 | 2001 VO_{1} | — | November 9, 2001 | Palomar | NEAT | · | 1.3 km | MPC · JPL |
| 382552 | 2001 VT_{53} | — | November 10, 2001 | Socorro | LINEAR | THB | 3.6 km | MPC · JPL |
| 382553 | 2001 VM_{69} | — | October 15, 2001 | Socorro | LINEAR | · | 4.2 km | MPC · JPL |
| 382554 | 2001 VG_{111} | — | November 12, 2001 | Socorro | LINEAR | · | 1.7 km | MPC · JPL |
| 382555 | 2001 VX_{117} | — | November 12, 2001 | Socorro | LINEAR | NYS | 1.7 km | MPC · JPL |
| 382556 | 2001 VF_{124} | — | November 9, 2001 | Socorro | LINEAR | NYS | 1.3 km | MPC · JPL |
| 382557 | 2001 WQ_{64} | — | November 20, 2001 | Socorro | LINEAR | · | 3.8 km | MPC · JPL |
| 382558 | 2001 XO_{34} | — | December 9, 2001 | Socorro | LINEAR | · | 3.1 km | MPC · JPL |
| 382559 | 2001 XW_{159} | — | December 14, 2001 | Socorro | LINEAR | · | 3.2 km | MPC · JPL |
| 382560 | 2001 XG_{215} | — | December 13, 2001 | Socorro | LINEAR | · | 1.5 km | MPC · JPL |
| 382561 | 2001 XL_{218} | — | December 15, 2001 | Socorro | LINEAR | NYS | 1.3 km | MPC · JPL |
| 382562 | 2001 XE_{243} | — | December 14, 2001 | Socorro | LINEAR | · | 2.6 km | MPC · JPL |
| 382563 | 2001 XQ_{264} | — | December 14, 2001 | Socorro | LINEAR | · | 3.8 km | MPC · JPL |
| 382564 | 2001 YA_{37} | — | December 18, 2001 | Socorro | LINEAR | · | 1.6 km | MPC · JPL |
| 382565 | 2002 AM_{40} | — | January 9, 2002 | Socorro | LINEAR | · | 1.6 km | MPC · JPL |
| 382566 | 2002 AK_{50} | — | January 9, 2002 | Socorro | LINEAR | · | 1.2 km | MPC · JPL |
| 382567 | 2002 AB_{53} | — | January 9, 2002 | Socorro | LINEAR | · | 1.5 km | MPC · JPL |
| 382568 | 2002 AA_{55} | — | January 9, 2002 | Socorro | LINEAR | · | 720 m | MPC · JPL |
| 382569 | 2002 AX_{67} | — | January 9, 2002 | Kitt Peak | Spacewatch | · | 890 m | MPC · JPL |
| 382570 | 2002 AM_{86} | — | January 9, 2002 | Socorro | LINEAR | · | 1.7 km | MPC · JPL |
| 382571 | 2002 AY_{126} | — | January 13, 2002 | Socorro | LINEAR | · | 1.0 km | MPC · JPL |
| 382572 | 2002 AJ_{149} | — | January 14, 2002 | Socorro | LINEAR | · | 630 m | MPC · JPL |
| 382573 | 2002 AK_{174} | — | January 14, 2002 | Socorro | LINEAR | · | 1.2 km | MPC · JPL |
| 382574 | 2002 AQ_{195} | — | January 13, 2002 | Kitt Peak | Spacewatch | · | 2.8 km | MPC · JPL |
| 382575 | 2002 BT_{12} | — | January 20, 2002 | Kitt Peak | Spacewatch | · | 960 m | MPC · JPL |
| 382576 | 2002 BX_{26} | — | January 17, 2002 | Palomar | NEAT | · | 1.8 km | MPC · JPL |
| 382577 | 2002 CY_{67} | — | February 7, 2002 | Socorro | LINEAR | · | 1.9 km | MPC · JPL |
| 382578 | 2002 CJ_{97} | — | February 7, 2002 | Socorro | LINEAR | EUN | 1.4 km | MPC · JPL |
| 382579 | 2002 CZ_{126} | — | February 7, 2002 | Socorro | LINEAR | · | 2.0 km | MPC · JPL |
| 382580 | 2002 CR_{150} | — | February 10, 2002 | Socorro | LINEAR | · | 1.0 km | MPC · JPL |
| 382581 | 2002 CS_{150} | — | February 10, 2002 | Socorro | LINEAR | · | 1.1 km | MPC · JPL |
| 382582 | 2002 CX_{152} | — | February 11, 2002 | Socorro | LINEAR | · | 1.3 km | MPC · JPL |
| 382583 | 2002 CQ_{166} | — | February 8, 2002 | Socorro | LINEAR | · | 1.4 km | MPC · JPL |
| 382584 | 2002 CP_{194} | — | February 10, 2002 | Socorro | LINEAR | · | 1.3 km | MPC · JPL |
| 382585 | 2002 CM_{207} | — | February 10, 2002 | Socorro | LINEAR | · | 1.3 km | MPC · JPL |
| 382586 | 2002 CC_{214} | — | February 10, 2002 | Socorro | LINEAR | · | 710 m | MPC · JPL |
| 382587 | 2002 CL_{229} | — | February 8, 2002 | Kitt Peak | Spacewatch | · | 1.1 km | MPC · JPL |
| 382588 | 2002 CE_{234} | — | February 12, 2002 | Palomar | NEAT | · | 1.5 km | MPC · JPL |
| 382589 | 2002 CW_{261} | — | February 5, 2002 | Palomar | NEAT | · | 1.1 km | MPC · JPL |
| 382590 | 2002 CJ_{288} | — | February 10, 2002 | Socorro | LINEAR | · | 1.5 km | MPC · JPL |
| 382591 | 2002 CT_{301} | — | February 12, 2002 | Socorro | LINEAR | (5) | 1.6 km | MPC · JPL |
| 382592 | 2002 CO_{302} | — | February 12, 2002 | Socorro | LINEAR | · | 1.5 km | MPC · JPL |
| 382593 | 2002 CB_{306} | — | February 4, 2002 | Palomar | NEAT | · | 1.1 km | MPC · JPL |
| 382594 | 2002 DH_{17} | — | February 20, 2002 | Anderson Mesa | LONEOS | JUN | 1.6 km | MPC · JPL |
| 382595 | 2002 DD_{18} | — | February 20, 2002 | Socorro | LINEAR | (5) | 1.3 km | MPC · JPL |
| 382596 | 2002 EY_{1} | — | March 5, 2002 | Nashville | Clingan, R. | · | 1.1 km | MPC · JPL |
| 382597 | 2002 EL_{57} | — | March 13, 2002 | Socorro | LINEAR | EUN | 1.3 km | MPC · JPL |
| 382598 | 2002 EG_{96} | — | March 10, 2002 | Kitt Peak | Spacewatch | · | 1.7 km | MPC · JPL |
| 382599 | 2002 EL_{111} | — | March 9, 2002 | Anderson Mesa | LONEOS | · | 1.7 km | MPC · JPL |
| 382600 | 2002 EG_{122} | — | March 12, 2002 | Palomar | NEAT | · | 1.1 km | MPC · JPL |

== 382601–382700 ==
back to top

| Designation | | | Discovery | | | Properties | | Ref |
| Permanent | Provisional | Named after | Date | Site | Discoverer(s) | Category | Diam. | Ref |
|---|---|---|---|---|---|---|---|---|
| 382601 | 2002 EK_{124} | — | March 12, 2002 | Kitt Peak | Spacewatch | · | 1.1 km | MPC · JPL |
| 382602 | 2002 GW_{11} | — | April 15, 2002 | Desert Eagle | W. K. Y. Yeung | · | 1.5 km | MPC · JPL |
| 382603 | 2002 GA_{68} | — | April 8, 2002 | Palomar | NEAT | · | 1.3 km | MPC · JPL |
| 382604 | 2002 GC_{75} | — | April 9, 2002 | Palomar | NEAT | · | 1.1 km | MPC · JPL |
| 382605 | 2002 GU_{85} | — | April 10, 2002 | Palomar | NEAT | EUN | 1.7 km | MPC · JPL |
| 382606 | 2002 JY_{3} | — | May 5, 2002 | Socorro | LINEAR | · | 1.5 km | MPC · JPL |
| 382607 | 2002 JA_{108} | — | May 14, 2002 | Palomar | NEAT | H | 520 m | MPC · JPL |
| 382608 | 2002 LW_{22} | — | June 8, 2002 | Socorro | LINEAR | · | 2.9 km | MPC · JPL |
| 382609 | 2002 LQ_{29} | — | June 9, 2002 | Haleakala | NEAT | · | 3.0 km | MPC · JPL |
| 382610 | 2002 LJ_{30} | — | June 1, 2002 | Palomar | NEAT | · | 1.6 km | MPC · JPL |
| 382611 | 2002 NA_{16} | — | July 5, 2002 | Socorro | LINEAR | · | 960 m | MPC · JPL |
| 382612 | 2002 NH_{48} | — | July 14, 2002 | Palomar | NEAT | · | 1.0 km | MPC · JPL |
| 382613 | 2002 NW_{61} | — | July 13, 2002 | Socorro | LINEAR | H | 750 m | MPC · JPL |
| 382614 | 2002 NN_{70} | — | July 9, 2002 | Palomar | NEAT | BRA | 1.8 km | MPC · JPL |
| 382615 | 2002 NM_{71} | — | July 8, 2002 | Palomar | NEAT | PHO | 1.0 km | MPC · JPL |
| 382616 | 2002 OX_{7} | — | July 21, 2002 | Palomar | NEAT | · | 1.8 km | MPC · JPL |
| 382617 | 2002 OK_{20} | — | July 28, 2002 | Palomar | NEAT | ADE | 2.1 km | MPC · JPL |
| 382618 | 2002 OL_{34} | — | July 29, 2002 | Palomar | NEAT | KOR | 1.3 km | MPC · JPL |
| 382619 | 2002 PB_{31} | — | August 6, 2002 | Palomar | NEAT | · | 2.4 km | MPC · JPL |
| 382620 | 2002 PX_{32} | — | August 6, 2002 | Palomar | NEAT | · | 1.8 km | MPC · JPL |
| 382621 | 2002 PS_{78} | — | August 11, 2002 | Palomar | NEAT | · | 950 m | MPC · JPL |
| 382622 | 2002 PF_{88} | — | August 12, 2002 | Socorro | LINEAR | H | 590 m | MPC · JPL |
| 382623 | 2002 PE_{113} | — | August 12, 2002 | Socorro | LINEAR | · | 740 m | MPC · JPL |
| 382624 | 2002 PY_{124} | — | August 13, 2002 | Anderson Mesa | LONEOS | · | 770 m | MPC · JPL |
| 382625 | 2002 PC_{130} | — | August 7, 2002 | Palomar | NEAT | AMO | 750 m | MPC · JPL |
| 382626 | 2002 PU_{153} | — | August 8, 2002 | Palomar | NEAT | · | 640 m | MPC · JPL |
| 382627 | 2002 PB_{167} | — | August 8, 2002 | Palomar | NEAT | H | 620 m | MPC · JPL |
| 382628 | 2002 PA_{182} | — | August 15, 2002 | Palomar | NEAT | · | 2.1 km | MPC · JPL |
| 382629 | 2002 PA_{190} | — | August 15, 2002 | Palomar | NEAT | · | 790 m | MPC · JPL |
| 382630 | 2002 QC_{9} | — | August 19, 2002 | Palomar | NEAT | · | 890 m | MPC · JPL |
| 382631 | 2002 QQ_{14} | — | August 26, 2002 | Palomar | NEAT | · | 840 m | MPC · JPL |
| 382632 | 2002 QN_{21} | — | August 26, 2002 | Palomar | NEAT | PHO | 1.2 km | MPC · JPL |
| 382633 | 2002 QP_{75} | — | August 18, 2002 | Palomar | NEAT | H | 490 m | MPC · JPL |
| 382634 | 2002 QJ_{82} | — | August 30, 2002 | Palomar | NEAT | · | 870 m | MPC · JPL |
| 382635 | 2002 QB_{86} | — | August 17, 2002 | Palomar | NEAT | · | 2.6 km | MPC · JPL |
| 382636 | 2002 QP_{103} | — | August 18, 2002 | Palomar | NEAT | · | 720 m | MPC · JPL |
| 382637 | 2002 QO_{114} | — | August 28, 2002 | Palomar | NEAT | · | 2.9 km | MPC · JPL |
| 382638 | 2002 QJ_{134} | — | August 30, 2002 | Palomar | NEAT | · | 610 m | MPC · JPL |
| 382639 | 2002 QX_{137} | — | August 17, 2002 | Palomar | NEAT | · | 820 m | MPC · JPL |
| 382640 | 2002 QH_{140} | — | August 20, 2002 | Palomar | NEAT | · | 810 m | MPC · JPL |
| 382641 | 2002 RX_{5} | — | September 4, 2002 | Palomar | NEAT | PHO | 1.5 km | MPC · JPL |
| 382642 | 2002 RP_{53} | — | September 5, 2002 | Socorro | LINEAR | · | 1.1 km | MPC · JPL |
| 382643 | 2002 RT_{126} | — | September 9, 2002 | Palomar | NEAT | · | 780 m | MPC · JPL |
| 382644 | 2002 RC_{134} | — | September 10, 2002 | Palomar | NEAT | · | 730 m | MPC · JPL |
| 382645 | 2002 RE_{142} | — | September 11, 2002 | Palomar | NEAT | V | 620 m | MPC · JPL |
| 382646 | 2002 RN_{175} | — | September 13, 2002 | Palomar | NEAT | · | 940 m | MPC · JPL |
| 382647 | 2002 RB_{178} | — | September 13, 2002 | Palomar | NEAT | · | 2.4 km | MPC · JPL |
| 382648 | 2002 RC_{188} | — | September 12, 2002 | Palomar | NEAT | V | 620 m | MPC · JPL |
| 382649 | 2002 RJ_{215} | — | September 13, 2002 | Socorro | LINEAR | · | 860 m | MPC · JPL |
| 382650 | 2002 RW_{271} | — | September 4, 2002 | Palomar | NEAT | · | 640 m | MPC · JPL |
| 382651 | 2002 RB_{280} | — | September 14, 2002 | Palomar | NEAT | · | 870 m | MPC · JPL |
| 382652 | 2002 SS_{3} | — | September 26, 2002 | Palomar | NEAT | · | 790 m | MPC · JPL |
| 382653 | 2002 SV_{11} | — | September 27, 2002 | Palomar | NEAT | · | 880 m | MPC · JPL |
| 382654 | 2002 SS_{46} | — | September 29, 2002 | Haleakala | NEAT | · | 1.3 km | MPC · JPL |
| 382655 | 2002 SY_{63} | — | September 27, 2002 | Palomar | NEAT | H | 540 m | MPC · JPL |
| 382656 | 2002 SW_{67} | — | September 26, 2002 | Palomar | NEAT | · | 1.7 km | MPC · JPL |
| 382657 | 2002 TD_{9} | — | October 1, 2002 | Črni Vrh | Mikuž, H. | · | 2.4 km | MPC · JPL |
| 382658 | 2002 TU_{24} | — | October 2, 2002 | Socorro | LINEAR | · | 2.5 km | MPC · JPL |
| 382659 | 2002 TK_{61} | — | October 3, 2002 | Campo Imperatore | CINEOS | · | 3.9 km | MPC · JPL |
| 382660 | 2002 TK_{80} | — | October 1, 2002 | Anderson Mesa | LONEOS | · | 920 m | MPC · JPL |
| 382661 | 2002 TT_{88} | — | October 3, 2002 | Palomar | NEAT | · | 1.5 km | MPC · JPL |
| 382662 | 2002 TL_{94} | — | October 3, 2002 | Socorro | LINEAR | · | 640 m | MPC · JPL |
| 382663 | 2002 TB_{98} | — | October 1, 1995 | Kitt Peak | Spacewatch | · | 850 m | MPC · JPL |
| 382664 | 2002 TD_{101} | — | October 4, 2002 | Socorro | LINEAR | · | 820 m | MPC · JPL |
| 382665 | 2002 TG_{101} | — | October 4, 2002 | Socorro | LINEAR | · | 2.3 km | MPC · JPL |
| 382666 | 2002 TL_{101} | — | October 4, 2002 | Socorro | LINEAR | (2076) | 930 m | MPC · JPL |
| 382667 | 2002 TZ_{107} | — | October 1, 2002 | Anderson Mesa | LONEOS | · | 1.1 km | MPC · JPL |
| 382668 | 2002 TG_{121} | — | October 3, 2002 | Palomar | NEAT | · | 1.1 km | MPC · JPL |
| 382669 | 2002 TA_{126} | — | October 4, 2002 | Palomar | NEAT | · | 1.2 km | MPC · JPL |
| 382670 | 2002 TQ_{147} | — | October 4, 2002 | Palomar | NEAT | · | 1.1 km | MPC · JPL |
| 382671 | 2002 TQ_{155} | — | October 5, 2002 | Palomar | NEAT | · | 720 m | MPC · JPL |
| 382672 | 2002 TG_{205} | — | October 4, 2002 | Socorro | LINEAR | · | 990 m | MPC · JPL |
| 382673 | 2002 TP_{210} | — | October 7, 2002 | Socorro | LINEAR | · | 2.1 km | MPC · JPL |
| 382674 | 2002 TH_{224} | — | October 8, 2002 | Anderson Mesa | LONEOS | · | 430 m | MPC · JPL |
| 382675 | 2002 TG_{286} | — | October 10, 2002 | Socorro | LINEAR | · | 1.3 km | MPC · JPL |
| 382676 | 2002 TL_{287} | — | October 10, 2002 | Socorro | LINEAR | · | 1.7 km | MPC · JPL |
| 382677 | 2002 TG_{314} | — | October 4, 2002 | Apache Point | SDSS | TEL | 1.4 km | MPC · JPL |
| 382678 | 2002 TT_{346} | — | October 5, 2002 | Apache Point | SDSS | · | 980 m | MPC · JPL |
| 382679 | 2002 TP_{370} | — | October 10, 2002 | Apache Point | SDSS | · | 1.0 km | MPC · JPL |
| 382680 | 2002 TO_{381} | — | October 9, 2002 | Palomar | NEAT | · | 560 m | MPC · JPL |
| 382681 | 2002 UD_{4} | — | October 28, 2002 | Socorro | LINEAR | PHO | 1.5 km | MPC · JPL |
| 382682 | 2002 UK_{51} | — | October 29, 2002 | Apache Point | SDSS | · | 930 m | MPC · JPL |
| 382683 | 2002 UL_{60} | — | October 29, 2002 | Apache Point | SDSS | EOS | 1.6 km | MPC · JPL |
| 382684 | 2002 UJ_{71} | — | October 16, 2002 | Palomar | NEAT | · | 1.0 km | MPC · JPL |
| 382685 | 2002 UW_{75} | — | October 31, 2002 | Palomar | NEAT | · | 1.1 km | MPC · JPL |
| 382686 | 2002 VZ_{14} | — | November 6, 2002 | Needville | Needville | · | 2.8 km | MPC · JPL |
| 382687 | 2002 VH_{25} | — | November 5, 2002 | Socorro | LINEAR | NYS | 1.5 km | MPC · JPL |
| 382688 | 2002 VH_{26} | — | November 5, 2002 | Socorro | LINEAR | · | 1.2 km | MPC · JPL |
| 382689 | 2002 VK_{27} | — | November 5, 2002 | Socorro | LINEAR | · | 1.0 km | MPC · JPL |
| 382690 | 2002 VN_{51} | — | November 6, 2002 | Anderson Mesa | LONEOS | NYS | 930 m | MPC · JPL |
| 382691 | 2002 VS_{60} | — | November 3, 2002 | Haleakala | NEAT | · | 1.1 km | MPC · JPL |
| 382692 | 2002 VT_{60} | — | November 4, 2002 | Palomar | NEAT | NYS | 1.1 km | MPC · JPL |
| 382693 | 2002 VY_{60} | — | November 5, 2002 | Socorro | LINEAR | · | 1.3 km | MPC · JPL |
| 382694 | 2002 VM_{66} | — | November 6, 2002 | Socorro | LINEAR | · | 1.2 km | MPC · JPL |
| 382695 | 2002 VK_{71} | — | November 7, 2002 | Socorro | LINEAR | · | 930 m | MPC · JPL |
| 382696 | 2002 VU_{88} | — | November 11, 2002 | Anderson Mesa | LONEOS | · | 1.2 km | MPC · JPL |
| 382697 | 2002 VR_{91} | — | November 12, 2002 | Anderson Mesa | LONEOS | · | 3.0 km | MPC · JPL |
| 382698 | 2002 VL_{92} | — | November 12, 2002 | Socorro | LINEAR | T_{j} (2.89) | 6.1 km | MPC · JPL |
| 382699 | 2002 VW_{100} | — | November 11, 2002 | Anderson Mesa | LONEOS | · | 2.3 km | MPC · JPL |
| 382700 | 2002 VK_{114} | — | November 13, 2002 | Palomar | NEAT | · | 1.1 km | MPC · JPL |

== 382701–382800 ==
back to top

| Designation | | | Discovery | | | Properties | | Ref |
| Permanent | Provisional | Named after | Date | Site | Discoverer(s) | Category | Diam. | Ref |
|---|---|---|---|---|---|---|---|---|
| 382701 | 2002 VR_{135} | — | November 7, 2002 | Kitt Peak | M. W. Buie | · | 720 m | MPC · JPL |
| 382702 | 2002 VU_{137} | — | November 13, 2002 | Palomar | Lowe, A. | · | 1.9 km | MPC · JPL |
| 382703 | 2002 VX_{139} | — | November 13, 2002 | Apache Point | SDSS | · | 3.4 km | MPC · JPL |
| 382704 | 2002 VJ_{142} | — | November 5, 2002 | Palomar | NEAT | · | 3.8 km | MPC · JPL |
| 382705 | 2002 VR_{146} | — | November 4, 2002 | Palomar | NEAT | · | 4.7 km | MPC · JPL |
| 382706 | 2002 VE_{147} | — | November 13, 2002 | Palomar | NEAT | · | 800 m | MPC · JPL |
| 382707 | 2002 WD_{19} | — | November 24, 2002 | Palomar | S. F. Hönig | MAS | 610 m | MPC · JPL |
| 382708 | 2002 WR_{21} | — | November 24, 2002 | Palomar | NEAT | · | 1.3 km | MPC · JPL |
| 382709 | 2002 WX_{22} | — | November 24, 2002 | Palomar | NEAT | · | 3.2 km | MPC · JPL |
| 382710 | 2002 WP_{25} | — | November 24, 2002 | Palomar | NEAT | · | 4.2 km | MPC · JPL |
| 382711 | 2002 WM_{27} | — | November 24, 2002 | Palomar | NEAT | · | 1.0 km | MPC · JPL |
| 382712 | 2002 WM_{29} | — | November 16, 2002 | Palomar | NEAT | · | 970 m | MPC · JPL |
| 382713 | 2002 XB_{1} | — | December 1, 2002 | Nashville | Clingan, R. | · | 990 m | MPC · JPL |
| 382714 | 2002 XJ_{2} | — | December 1, 2002 | Socorro | LINEAR | · | 3.5 km | MPC · JPL |
| 382715 | 2002 XJ_{17} | — | November 14, 2002 | Socorro | LINEAR | · | 1.4 km | MPC · JPL |
| 382716 | 2002 XW_{41} | — | December 6, 2002 | Socorro | LINEAR | · | 1.2 km | MPC · JPL |
| 382717 | 2002 XG_{43} | — | December 10, 2002 | Palomar | NEAT | · | 1 km | MPC · JPL |
| 382718 | 2002 XR_{50} | — | December 10, 2002 | Socorro | LINEAR | · | 1.2 km | MPC · JPL |
| 382719 | 2002 XU_{64} | — | December 11, 2002 | Socorro | LINEAR | H | 800 m | MPC · JPL |
| 382720 | 2002 XO_{79} | — | December 11, 2002 | Socorro | LINEAR | PHO | 1.6 km | MPC · JPL |
| 382721 | 2002 XH_{82} | — | December 11, 2002 | Socorro | LINEAR | · | 3.4 km | MPC · JPL |
| 382722 | 2002 XR_{90} | — | December 3, 2002 | Uccle | T. Pauwels | · | 1.7 km | MPC · JPL |
| 382723 | 2002 XK_{119} | — | December 10, 2002 | Palomar | NEAT | · | 1.1 km | MPC · JPL |
| 382724 | 2002 YR_{8} | — | December 31, 2002 | Socorro | LINEAR | · | 1.3 km | MPC · JPL |
| 382725 | 2002 YT_{24} | — | December 31, 2002 | Socorro | LINEAR | MAS | 880 m | MPC · JPL |
| 382726 | 2002 YG_{26} | — | December 31, 2002 | Socorro | LINEAR | T_{j} (2.96) | 4.1 km | MPC · JPL |
| 382727 | 2003 AR_{3} | — | January 2, 2003 | Socorro | LINEAR | PHO | 1.2 km | MPC · JPL |
| 382728 | 2003 AD_{21} | — | January 5, 2003 | Socorro | LINEAR | · | 1.5 km | MPC · JPL |
| 382729 | 2003 AV_{25} | — | January 4, 2003 | Socorro | LINEAR | · | 4.0 km | MPC · JPL |
| 382730 | 2003 AG_{33} | — | January 5, 2003 | Socorro | LINEAR | · | 4.7 km | MPC · JPL |
| 382731 | 2003 AN_{42} | — | January 7, 2003 | Socorro | LINEAR | · | 5.9 km | MPC · JPL |
| 382732 | 2003 AF_{43} | — | December 5, 2002 | Socorro | LINEAR | · | 3.5 km | MPC · JPL |
| 382733 | 2003 AN_{51} | — | December 5, 2002 | Socorro | LINEAR | · | 3.0 km | MPC · JPL |
| 382734 | 2003 AZ_{63} | — | January 8, 2003 | Socorro | LINEAR | · | 3.5 km | MPC · JPL |
| 382735 | 2003 AJ_{70} | — | January 9, 2003 | Socorro | LINEAR | · | 1.0 km | MPC · JPL |
| 382736 | 2003 AG_{82} | — | January 13, 2003 | Socorro | LINEAR | EUP | 6.2 km | MPC · JPL |
| 382737 | 2003 AM_{90} | — | January 5, 2003 | Socorro | LINEAR | · | 1.7 km | MPC · JPL |
| 382738 | 2003 BY_{5} | — | January 27, 2003 | Anderson Mesa | LONEOS | PHO | 1.1 km | MPC · JPL |
| 382739 | 2003 BW_{11} | — | January 26, 2003 | Anderson Mesa | LONEOS | · | 3.8 km | MPC · JPL |
| 382740 | 2003 BF_{14} | — | January 26, 2003 | Haleakala | NEAT | · | 1.2 km | MPC · JPL |
| 382741 | 2003 BC_{24} | — | January 25, 2003 | Palomar | NEAT | · | 3.9 km | MPC · JPL |
| 382742 | 2003 BK_{48} | — | January 26, 2003 | Kitt Peak | Spacewatch | · | 3.6 km | MPC · JPL |
| 382743 | 2003 BQ_{74} | — | January 29, 2003 | Palomar | NEAT | · | 1.3 km | MPC · JPL |
| 382744 | 2003 BD_{92} | — | January 26, 2003 | Haleakala | NEAT | · | 1.3 km | MPC · JPL |
| 382745 | 2003 CC | — | February 1, 2003 | Kitt Peak | Spacewatch | AMO · APO · PHA | 290 m | MPC · JPL |
| 382746 | 2003 CH_{7} | — | February 1, 2003 | Socorro | LINEAR | PHO | 1.6 km | MPC · JPL |
| 382747 | 2003 CA_{26} | — | February 2, 2003 | Palomar | NEAT | · | 3.8 km | MPC · JPL |
| 382748 | 2003 CM_{26} | — | October 24, 2001 | Kitt Peak | Spacewatch | · | 2.7 km | MPC · JPL |
| 382749 | 2003 DB | — | February 19, 2003 | Palomar | NEAT | T_{j} (2.98) | 4.5 km | MPC · JPL |
| 382750 | 2003 DK | — | February 19, 2003 | Haleakala | NEAT | TIR | 3.9 km | MPC · JPL |
| 382751 | 2003 DC_{21} | — | February 22, 2003 | Palomar | NEAT | H | 780 m | MPC · JPL |
| 382752 | 2003 DY_{24} | — | February 22, 2003 | Palomar | NEAT | · | 2.1 km | MPC · JPL |
| 382753 | 2003 EU_{8} | — | March 6, 2003 | Socorro | LINEAR | T_{j} (2.95) | 2.3 km | MPC · JPL |
| 382754 | 2003 EW_{38} | — | March 8, 2003 | Kitt Peak | Spacewatch | NYS | 1.1 km | MPC · JPL |
| 382755 | 2003 ET_{44} | — | March 7, 2003 | Anderson Mesa | LONEOS | · | 1.3 km | MPC · JPL |
| 382756 | 2003 FE_{17} | — | March 24, 2003 | Kitt Peak | Spacewatch | · | 1.8 km | MPC · JPL |
| 382757 | 2003 FS_{37} | — | March 23, 2003 | Kitt Peak | Spacewatch | · | 1.3 km | MPC · JPL |
| 382758 | 2003 GY | — | April 5, 2003 | Haleakala | NEAT | APO · PHA | 320 m | MPC · JPL |
| 382759 | 2003 LT_{3} | — | June 3, 2003 | Catalina | CSS | T_{j} (2.95) | 4.0 km | MPC · JPL |
| 382760 | 2003 NY | — | July 2, 2003 | Socorro | LINEAR | · | 1.9 km | MPC · JPL |
| 382761 | 2003 OW_{15} | — | July 23, 2003 | Palomar | NEAT | DOR | 2.2 km | MPC · JPL |
| 382762 | 2003 OJ_{19} | — | July 30, 2003 | Palomar | NEAT | · | 2.5 km | MPC · JPL |
| 382763 | 2003 OS_{30} | — | July 24, 2003 | Palomar | NEAT | · | 2.5 km | MPC · JPL |
| 382764 | 2003 QP_{10} | — | August 22, 2003 | Kleť | J. Tichá, M. Tichý | MAR | 1.5 km | MPC · JPL |
| 382765 | 2003 QR_{23} | — | August 21, 2003 | Campo Imperatore | CINEOS | BAR | 1.8 km | MPC · JPL |
| 382766 | 2003 QJ_{103} | — | August 31, 2003 | Haleakala | NEAT | · | 2.7 km | MPC · JPL |
| 382767 | 2003 RO_{12} | — | September 14, 2003 | Haleakala | NEAT | · | 2.0 km | MPC · JPL |
| 382768 | 2003 SJ_{6} | — | September 16, 2003 | Haleakala | NEAT | · | 2.8 km | MPC · JPL |
| 382769 | 2003 SX_{7} | — | September 16, 2003 | Palomar | NEAT | · | 2.4 km | MPC · JPL |
| 382770 | 2003 SG_{24} | — | September 17, 2003 | Palomar | NEAT | · | 2.3 km | MPC · JPL |
| 382771 | 2003 SL_{37} | — | September 16, 2003 | Palomar | NEAT | · | 2.2 km | MPC · JPL |
| 382772 | 2003 SM_{50} | — | September 18, 2003 | Palomar | NEAT | · | 3.2 km | MPC · JPL |
| 382773 | 2003 SC_{71} | — | September 4, 2003 | Socorro | LINEAR | GEF | 1.4 km | MPC · JPL |
| 382774 | 2003 SD_{77} | — | September 19, 2003 | Kitt Peak | Spacewatch | · | 2.5 km | MPC · JPL |
| 382775 | 2003 SQ_{96} | — | September 19, 2003 | Palomar | NEAT | · | 2.1 km | MPC · JPL |
| 382776 | 2003 SS_{102} | — | September 20, 2003 | Socorro | LINEAR | · | 2.2 km | MPC · JPL |
| 382777 | 2003 SR_{111} | — | September 20, 2003 | Socorro | LINEAR | · | 2.0 km | MPC · JPL |
| 382778 | 2003 SM_{119} | — | September 17, 2003 | Anderson Mesa | LONEOS | · | 750 m | MPC · JPL |
| 382779 | 2003 SL_{121} | — | September 17, 2003 | Kitt Peak | Spacewatch | · | 1.7 km | MPC · JPL |
| 382780 | 2003 SX_{184} | — | September 21, 2003 | Kitt Peak | Spacewatch | (13314) | 2.1 km | MPC · JPL |
| 382781 | 2003 SY_{240} | — | September 27, 2003 | Socorro | LINEAR | · | 2.9 km | MPC · JPL |
| 382782 | 2003 SN_{267} | — | September 29, 2003 | Kitt Peak | Spacewatch | · | 1.8 km | MPC · JPL |
| 382783 | 2003 SR_{275} | — | September 29, 2003 | Socorro | LINEAR | · | 1.3 km | MPC · JPL |
| 382784 | 2003 SG_{296} | — | September 30, 2003 | Socorro | LINEAR | GEF | 1.4 km | MPC · JPL |
| 382785 | 2003 SO_{327} | — | September 19, 2003 | Kitt Peak | Spacewatch | MRX | 910 m | MPC · JPL |
| 382786 | 2003 SW_{333} | — | September 28, 2003 | Apache Point | SDSS | · | 1.7 km | MPC · JPL |
| 382787 | 2003 SK_{346} | — | September 18, 2003 | Kitt Peak | Spacewatch | · | 1.6 km | MPC · JPL |
| 382788 | 2003 SE_{349} | — | September 18, 2003 | Kitt Peak | Spacewatch | · | 1.7 km | MPC · JPL |
| 382789 | 2003 SV_{350} | — | September 19, 2003 | Kitt Peak | Spacewatch | · | 1.2 km | MPC · JPL |
| 382790 | 2003 SC_{370} | — | September 26, 2003 | Apache Point | SDSS | · | 1.6 km | MPC · JPL |
| 382791 | 2003 SA_{375} | — | September 26, 2003 | Apache Point | SDSS | · | 1.9 km | MPC · JPL |
| 382792 | 2003 SM_{384} | — | September 26, 2003 | Apache Point | SDSS | · | 1.9 km | MPC · JPL |
| 382793 | 2003 SB_{387} | — | September 26, 2003 | Apache Point | SDSS | · | 1.6 km | MPC · JPL |
| 382794 | 2003 TH_{18} | — | October 14, 2003 | Palomar | NEAT | · | 2.2 km | MPC · JPL |
| 382795 | 2003 TF_{20} | — | October 14, 2003 | Palomar | NEAT | · | 2.6 km | MPC · JPL |
| 382796 | 2003 UL_{8} | — | October 5, 2003 | Socorro | LINEAR | · | 3.5 km | MPC · JPL |
| 382797 | 2003 UF_{44} | — | October 18, 2003 | Kitt Peak | Spacewatch | · | 2.0 km | MPC · JPL |
| 382798 | 2003 UP_{49} | — | October 16, 2003 | Palomar | NEAT | · | 2.3 km | MPC · JPL |
| 382799 | 2003 UC_{50} | — | October 2, 2003 | Socorro | LINEAR | · | 2.2 km | MPC · JPL |
| 382800 | 2003 UD_{58} | — | October 16, 2003 | Kitt Peak | Spacewatch | · | 610 m | MPC · JPL |

== 382801–382900 ==
back to top

| Designation | | | Discovery | | | Properties | | Ref |
| Permanent | Provisional | Named after | Date | Site | Discoverer(s) | Category | Diam. | Ref |
|---|---|---|---|---|---|---|---|---|
| 382801 | 2003 UY_{74} | — | September 21, 2003 | Anderson Mesa | LONEOS | · | 690 m | MPC · JPL |
| 382802 | 2003 UT_{130} | — | October 19, 2003 | Palomar | NEAT | · | 2.2 km | MPC · JPL |
| 382803 | 2003 US_{136} | — | October 21, 2003 | Socorro | LINEAR | BRA | 2.0 km | MPC · JPL |
| 382804 | 2003 UY_{136} | — | October 21, 2003 | Palomar | NEAT | · | 690 m | MPC · JPL |
| 382805 | 2003 UA_{144} | — | September 29, 2003 | Socorro | LINEAR | · | 940 m | MPC · JPL |
| 382806 | 2003 UZ_{157} | — | October 20, 2003 | Kitt Peak | Spacewatch | · | 620 m | MPC · JPL |
| 382807 | 2003 UB_{192} | — | October 23, 2003 | Anderson Mesa | LONEOS | GEF | 1.6 km | MPC · JPL |
| 382808 | 2003 UF_{206} | — | October 22, 2003 | Socorro | LINEAR | (18466) | 3.0 km | MPC · JPL |
| 382809 | 2003 UN_{207} | — | October 22, 2003 | Kitt Peak | Spacewatch | · | 640 m | MPC · JPL |
| 382810 | 2003 UX_{214} | — | September 22, 2003 | Kitt Peak | Spacewatch | · | 2.0 km | MPC · JPL |
| 382811 | 2003 UM_{216} | — | October 21, 2003 | Socorro | LINEAR | · | 3.0 km | MPC · JPL |
| 382812 | 2003 UD_{219} | — | October 21, 2003 | Palomar | NEAT | · | 710 m | MPC · JPL |
| 382813 | 2003 UA_{239} | — | October 24, 2003 | Socorro | LINEAR | · | 2.2 km | MPC · JPL |
| 382814 | 2003 UD_{334} | — | October 18, 2003 | Apache Point | SDSS | · | 1.8 km | MPC · JPL |
| 382815 | 2003 UG_{346} | — | October 19, 2003 | Apache Point | SDSS | AST | 1.5 km | MPC · JPL |
| 382816 | 2003 UO_{352} | — | October 19, 2003 | Apache Point | SDSS | AGN | 1.2 km | MPC · JPL |
| 382817 | 2003 UX_{380} | — | October 22, 2003 | Apache Point | SDSS | · | 640 m | MPC · JPL |
| 382818 | 2003 VD_{6} | — | November 15, 2003 | Palomar | NEAT | · | 810 m | MPC · JPL |
| 382819 | 2003 VE_{11} | — | November 15, 2003 | Palomar | NEAT | BRA | 1.9 km | MPC · JPL |
| 382820 | 2003 WB_{9} | — | November 16, 2003 | Kitt Peak | Spacewatch | · | 670 m | MPC · JPL |
| 382821 | 2003 WA_{38} | — | November 19, 2003 | Socorro | LINEAR | (18466) | 2.8 km | MPC · JPL |
| 382822 | 2003 WQ_{46} | — | November 18, 2003 | Palomar | NEAT | AGN | 1.5 km | MPC · JPL |
| 382823 | 2003 WJ_{79} | — | November 20, 2003 | Socorro | LINEAR | MRX | 1.2 km | MPC · JPL |
| 382824 | 2003 WE_{86} | — | June 29, 2003 | Socorro | LINEAR | · | 3.5 km | MPC · JPL |
| 382825 | 2003 XB_{22} | — | December 15, 2003 | Siding Spring | R. H. McNaught | APO · PHA | 490 m | MPC · JPL |
| 382826 | 2003 XL_{28} | — | December 1, 2003 | Kitt Peak | Spacewatch | · | 1.7 km | MPC · JPL |
| 382827 | 2003 XN_{30} | — | November 19, 2003 | Kitt Peak | Spacewatch | · | 2.0 km | MPC · JPL |
| 382828 | 2003 YW_{2} | — | December 18, 2003 | Desert Eagle | W. K. Y. Yeung | KOR | 1.7 km | MPC · JPL |
| 382829 | 2003 YP_{22} | — | December 18, 2003 | Socorro | LINEAR | H | 530 m | MPC · JPL |
| 382830 | 2003 YA_{181} | — | December 19, 2003 | Kitt Peak | Spacewatch | · | 2.7 km | MPC · JPL |
| 382831 | 2003 YC_{181} | — | December 21, 2003 | Kitt Peak | Spacewatch | · | 500 m | MPC · JPL |
| 382832 | 2003 YD_{181} | — | December 22, 2003 | Kitt Peak | Spacewatch | · | 2.0 km | MPC · JPL |
| 382833 | 2004 AS_{5} | — | January 13, 2004 | Palomar | NEAT | · | 780 m | MPC · JPL |
| 382834 | 2004 AC_{21} | — | January 15, 2004 | Kitt Peak | Spacewatch | · | 2.0 km | MPC · JPL |
| 382835 | 2004 AT_{23} | — | January 15, 2004 | Kitt Peak | Spacewatch | · | 550 m | MPC · JPL |
| 382836 | 2004 BQ_{30} | — | January 18, 2004 | Palomar | NEAT | · | 3.0 km | MPC · JPL |
| 382837 | 2004 BZ_{38} | — | January 20, 2004 | Socorro | LINEAR | · | 870 m | MPC · JPL |
| 382838 | 2004 BG_{83} | — | January 23, 2004 | Socorro | LINEAR | · | 780 m | MPC · JPL |
| 382839 | 2004 BE_{88} | — | January 23, 2004 | Anderson Mesa | LONEOS | PHO | 1.3 km | MPC · JPL |
| 382840 | 2004 BR_{130} | — | January 16, 2004 | Kitt Peak | Spacewatch | (883) | 790 m | MPC · JPL |
| 382841 | 2004 CN_{14} | — | February 11, 2004 | Kitt Peak | Spacewatch | EOS | 2.0 km | MPC · JPL |
| 382842 | 2004 CP_{43} | — | February 12, 2004 | Kitt Peak | Spacewatch | EOS | 2.3 km | MPC · JPL |
| 382843 | 2004 CX_{47} | — | February 14, 2004 | Haleakala | NEAT | · | 750 m | MPC · JPL |
| 382844 | 2004 CB_{53} | — | February 11, 2004 | Kitt Peak | Spacewatch | · | 1.7 km | MPC · JPL |
| 382845 | 2004 CR_{103} | — | February 12, 2004 | Palomar | NEAT | · | 1.8 km | MPC · JPL |
| 382846 | 2004 DK_{47} | — | February 19, 2004 | Socorro | LINEAR | · | 1.1 km | MPC · JPL |
| 382847 | 2004 DK_{53} | — | February 23, 2004 | Bergisch Gladbach | W. Bickel | · | 680 m | MPC · JPL |
| 382848 | 2004 EF_{18} | — | March 12, 2004 | Palomar | NEAT | · | 4.5 km | MPC · JPL |
| 382849 | 2004 EA_{23} | — | March 15, 2004 | Catalina | CSS | · | 3.7 km | MPC · JPL |
| 382850 | 2004 EJ_{30} | — | March 15, 2004 | Catalina | CSS | · | 1.8 km | MPC · JPL |
| 382851 | 2004 EA_{54} | — | March 15, 2004 | Campo Imperatore | CINEOS | · | 770 m | MPC · JPL |
| 382852 | 2004 EF_{72} | — | March 15, 2004 | Socorro | LINEAR | · | 690 m | MPC · JPL |
| 382853 | 2004 ER_{88} | — | March 14, 2004 | Kitt Peak | Spacewatch | (2076) | 820 m | MPC · JPL |
| 382854 | 2004 EC_{96} | — | March 15, 2004 | Socorro | LINEAR | · | 3.6 km | MPC · JPL |
| 382855 | 2004 ED_{96} | — | March 15, 2004 | Palomar | NEAT | PHO | 1.0 km | MPC · JPL |
| 382856 | 2004 FK_{28} | — | March 18, 2004 | Socorro | LINEAR | · | 2.6 km | MPC · JPL |
| 382857 | 2004 FY_{28} | — | March 28, 2004 | Socorro | LINEAR | H | 610 m | MPC · JPL |
| 382858 | 2004 FE_{42} | — | February 13, 2004 | Kitt Peak | Spacewatch | · | 1.1 km | MPC · JPL |
| 382859 | 2004 FE_{83} | — | March 17, 2004 | Kitt Peak | Spacewatch | · | 870 m | MPC · JPL |
| 382860 | 2004 FT_{84} | — | March 18, 2004 | Socorro | LINEAR | · | 910 m | MPC · JPL |
| 382861 | 2004 FZ_{96} | — | March 23, 2004 | Socorro | LINEAR | · | 2.5 km | MPC · JPL |
| 382862 | 2004 FS_{97} | — | March 23, 2004 | Socorro | LINEAR | · | 920 m | MPC · JPL |
| 382863 | 2004 FD_{109} | — | March 24, 2004 | Anderson Mesa | LONEOS | · | 930 m | MPC · JPL |
| 382864 | 2004 FP_{125} | — | March 27, 2004 | Socorro | LINEAR | · | 820 m | MPC · JPL |
| 382865 | 2004 FV_{127} | — | March 27, 2004 | Socorro | LINEAR | · | 1.6 km | MPC · JPL |
| 382866 | 2004 FM_{155} | — | March 17, 2004 | Kitt Peak | Spacewatch | · | 3.2 km | MPC · JPL |
| 382867 | 2004 FT_{166} | — | March 16, 2004 | Siding Spring | SSS | · | 4.4 km | MPC · JPL |
| 382868 | 2004 GK_{14} | — | April 13, 2004 | Kitt Peak | Spacewatch | · | 1.5 km | MPC · JPL |
| 382869 | 2004 GX_{67} | — | April 13, 2004 | Kitt Peak | Spacewatch | · | 2.9 km | MPC · JPL |
| 382870 | 2004 HR_{31} | — | April 19, 2004 | Socorro | LINEAR | · | 3.3 km | MPC · JPL |
| 382871 | 2004 HS_{44} | — | April 21, 2004 | Socorro | LINEAR | · | 1.9 km | MPC · JPL |
| 382872 | 2004 HB_{61} | — | April 24, 2004 | Kitt Peak | Spacewatch | H | 440 m | MPC · JPL |
| 382873 | 2004 JJ_{23} | — | May 13, 2004 | Kitt Peak | Spacewatch | · | 3.1 km | MPC · JPL |
| 382874 | 2004 JQ_{51} | — | May 14, 2004 | Socorro | LINEAR | · | 3.2 km | MPC · JPL |
| 382875 | 2004 KE_{1} | — | May 19, 2004 | Kitt Peak | Spacewatch | AMO | 160 m | MPC · JPL |
| 382876 | 2004 KQ_{15} | — | May 19, 2004 | Kitt Peak | Spacewatch | · | 2.7 km | MPC · JPL |
| 382877 | 2004 LX_{1} | — | June 7, 2004 | Palomar | NEAT | H | 700 m | MPC · JPL |
| 382878 | 2004 LM_{5} | — | May 23, 2004 | Socorro | LINEAR | · | 1.3 km | MPC · JPL |
| 382879 | 2004 LD_{6} | — | June 13, 2004 | Palomar | NEAT | · | 2.1 km | MPC · JPL |
| 382880 | 2004 LF_{10} | — | June 13, 2004 | Palomar | NEAT | · | 1.7 km | MPC · JPL |
| 382881 | 2004 LV_{11} | — | June 12, 2004 | Siding Spring | SSS | · | 2.4 km | MPC · JPL |
| 382882 | 2004 LV_{26} | — | June 12, 2004 | Socorro | LINEAR | H | 650 m | MPC · JPL |
| 382883 | 2004 ML_{8} | — | June 16, 2004 | Kitt Peak | Spacewatch | · | 1.7 km | MPC · JPL |
| 382884 | 2004 NZ_{22} | — | July 11, 2004 | Socorro | LINEAR | · | 3.3 km | MPC · JPL |
| 382885 | 2004 NY_{25} | — | July 11, 2004 | Socorro | LINEAR | · | 1.6 km | MPC · JPL |
| 382886 | 2004 PT_{26} | — | August 9, 2004 | Anderson Mesa | LONEOS | H | 660 m | MPC · JPL |
| 382887 | 2004 PJ_{27} | — | August 8, 2004 | Reedy Creek | J. Broughton | · | 1.3 km | MPC · JPL |
| 382888 | 2004 PD_{40} | — | August 9, 2004 | Socorro | LINEAR | · | 1.6 km | MPC · JPL |
| 382889 | 2004 PG_{54} | — | August 8, 2004 | Anderson Mesa | LONEOS | · | 1.6 km | MPC · JPL |
| 382890 | 2004 PW_{55} | — | August 8, 2004 | Anderson Mesa | LONEOS | (1547) | 1.7 km | MPC · JPL |
| 382891 | 2004 PK_{63} | — | August 10, 2004 | Socorro | LINEAR | · | 1.3 km | MPC · JPL |
| 382892 | 2004 PN_{85} | — | August 10, 2004 | Socorro | LINEAR | · | 2.9 km | MPC · JPL |
| 382893 | 2004 PC_{88} | — | August 11, 2004 | Socorro | LINEAR | · | 2.2 km | MPC · JPL |
| 382894 | 2004 PK_{95} | — | August 12, 2004 | Palomar | NEAT | · | 1.9 km | MPC · JPL |
| 382895 | 2004 QS_{9} | — | August 21, 2004 | Siding Spring | SSS | · | 1.3 km | MPC · JPL |
| 382896 | 2004 QM_{17} | — | August 25, 2004 | Socorro | LINEAR | · | 3.6 km | MPC · JPL |
| 382897 | 2004 QZ_{18} | — | August 21, 2004 | Catalina | CSS | · | 2.0 km | MPC · JPL |
| 382898 | 2004 QJ_{19} | — | August 23, 2004 | Siding Spring | SSS | EUN | 1.5 km | MPC · JPL |
| 382899 | 2004 QM_{27} | — | August 23, 2004 | Siding Spring | SSS | · | 1.4 km | MPC · JPL |
| 382900 Rendelmann | 2004 RH_{8} | Rendelmann | September 6, 2004 | Altschwendt | W. Ries | · | 1.5 km | MPC · JPL |

== 382901–383000 ==
back to top

| Designation | | | Discovery | | | Properties | | Ref |
| Permanent | Provisional | Named after | Date | Site | Discoverer(s) | Category | Diam. | Ref |
|---|---|---|---|---|---|---|---|---|
| 382901 | 2004 RY_{68} | — | September 8, 2004 | Socorro | LINEAR | · | 1.3 km | MPC · JPL |
| 382902 | 2004 RN_{71} | — | September 8, 2004 | Socorro | LINEAR | · | 1.3 km | MPC · JPL |
| 382903 | 2004 RB_{77} | — | September 8, 2004 | Socorro | LINEAR | · | 1.4 km | MPC · JPL |
| 382904 | 2004 RT_{81} | — | September 8, 2004 | Socorro | LINEAR | · | 1.2 km | MPC · JPL |
| 382905 | 2004 RD_{105} | — | September 8, 2004 | Palomar | NEAT | EUN | 1.3 km | MPC · JPL |
| 382906 | 2004 RM_{120} | — | September 7, 2004 | Kitt Peak | Spacewatch | (5) | 1.1 km | MPC · JPL |
| 382907 | 2004 RZ_{139} | — | September 8, 2004 | Socorro | LINEAR | · | 1.4 km | MPC · JPL |
| 382908 | 2004 RY_{158} | — | September 10, 2004 | Socorro | LINEAR | · | 1.5 km | MPC · JPL |
| 382909 | 2004 RF_{168} | — | September 8, 2004 | Socorro | LINEAR | · | 1.4 km | MPC · JPL |
| 382910 | 2004 RL_{190} | — | August 19, 2004 | Socorro | LINEAR | · | 2.0 km | MPC · JPL |
| 382911 | 2004 RA_{191} | — | September 10, 2004 | Socorro | LINEAR | (1547) | 1.6 km | MPC · JPL |
| 382912 | 2004 RR_{194} | — | September 10, 2004 | Socorro | LINEAR | · | 1.8 km | MPC · JPL |
| 382913 | 2004 RA_{196} | — | September 10, 2004 | Socorro | LINEAR | · | 1.2 km | MPC · JPL |
| 382914 | 2004 RK_{199} | — | September 10, 2004 | Socorro | LINEAR | (1547) | 2.0 km | MPC · JPL |
| 382915 | 2004 RJ_{200} | — | September 10, 2004 | Socorro | LINEAR | · | 2.3 km | MPC · JPL |
| 382916 | 2004 RX_{207} | — | September 11, 2004 | Socorro | LINEAR | MAR | 1.3 km | MPC · JPL |
| 382917 | 2004 RP_{214} | — | September 11, 2004 | Socorro | LINEAR | · | 2.2 km | MPC · JPL |
| 382918 | 2004 RU_{217} | — | September 11, 2004 | Socorro | LINEAR | · | 2.0 km | MPC · JPL |
| 382919 | 2004 RS_{245} | — | September 10, 2004 | Kitt Peak | Spacewatch | · | 1.6 km | MPC · JPL |
| 382920 | 2004 RO_{249} | — | September 12, 2004 | Kitt Peak | Spacewatch | · | 1.2 km | MPC · JPL |
| 382921 | 2004 RE_{254} | — | September 6, 2004 | Palomar | NEAT | · | 2.8 km | MPC · JPL |
| 382922 | 2004 RW_{324} | — | September 13, 2004 | Socorro | LINEAR | · | 1.4 km | MPC · JPL |
| 382923 | 2004 RZ_{339} | — | August 20, 2004 | Catalina | CSS | · | 1.5 km | MPC · JPL |
| 382924 | 2004 RJ_{341} | — | September 11, 2004 | Socorro | LINEAR | MAR | 1.3 km | MPC · JPL |
| 382925 | 2004 SJ_{52} | — | September 18, 2004 | Socorro | LINEAR | (5) | 1.4 km | MPC · JPL |
| 382926 | 2004 SL_{53} | — | September 22, 2004 | Socorro | LINEAR | · | 1.4 km | MPC · JPL |
| 382927 | 2004 TG_{13} | — | October 8, 2004 | Socorro | LINEAR | · | 2.1 km | MPC · JPL |
| 382928 | 2004 TA_{59} | — | October 5, 2004 | Kitt Peak | Spacewatch | · | 1.6 km | MPC · JPL |
| 382929 | 2004 TP_{59} | — | October 5, 2004 | Kitt Peak | Spacewatch | EUN | 1.3 km | MPC · JPL |
| 382930 | 2004 TO_{61} | — | October 5, 2004 | Anderson Mesa | LONEOS | · | 1.7 km | MPC · JPL |
| 382931 | 2004 TD_{79} | — | October 4, 2004 | Socorro | LINEAR | EUN | 2.0 km | MPC · JPL |
| 382932 | 2004 TU_{95} | — | October 5, 2004 | Kitt Peak | Spacewatch | · | 2.3 km | MPC · JPL |
| 382933 | 2004 TT_{119} | — | September 14, 2004 | Socorro | LINEAR | · | 1.6 km | MPC · JPL |
| 382934 | 2004 TM_{144} | — | October 4, 2004 | Kitt Peak | Spacewatch | · | 1.5 km | MPC · JPL |
| 382935 | 2004 TP_{155} | — | October 6, 2004 | Kitt Peak | Spacewatch | HIL · 3:2 | 5.6 km | MPC · JPL |
| 382936 | 2004 TQ_{158} | — | October 6, 2004 | Kitt Peak | Spacewatch | · | 1.5 km | MPC · JPL |
| 382937 | 2004 TK_{175} | — | October 9, 2004 | Socorro | LINEAR | · | 1.9 km | MPC · JPL |
| 382938 | 2004 TK_{194} | — | October 7, 2004 | Kitt Peak | Spacewatch | (1547) | 1.8 km | MPC · JPL |
| 382939 | 2004 TS_{240} | — | October 10, 2004 | Socorro | LINEAR | EUN | 1.6 km | MPC · JPL |
| 382940 | 2004 TM_{241} | — | October 10, 2004 | Socorro | LINEAR | · | 1.8 km | MPC · JPL |
| 382941 | 2004 TV_{277} | — | October 9, 2004 | Kitt Peak | Spacewatch | · | 1.5 km | MPC · JPL |
| 382942 | 2004 TD_{287} | — | October 9, 2004 | Socorro | LINEAR | · | 2.0 km | MPC · JPL |
| 382943 | 2004 TU_{309} | — | September 18, 2004 | Socorro | LINEAR | · | 1.7 km | MPC · JPL |
| 382944 | 2004 TA_{316} | — | October 11, 2004 | Kitt Peak | Spacewatch | · | 2.3 km | MPC · JPL |
| 382945 | 2004 TM_{333} | — | October 9, 2004 | Kitt Peak | Spacewatch | · | 1.3 km | MPC · JPL |
| 382946 | 2004 TW_{335} | — | October 10, 2004 | Kitt Peak | Spacewatch | · | 1.7 km | MPC · JPL |
| 382947 | 2004 TQ_{343} | — | October 14, 2004 | Kitt Peak | Spacewatch | · | 1.4 km | MPC · JPL |
| 382948 | 2004 TP_{357} | — | October 6, 2004 | Kitt Peak | Spacewatch | · | 1.7 km | MPC · JPL |
| 382949 | 2004 UA_{5} | — | October 18, 2004 | Socorro | LINEAR | · | 1.7 km | MPC · JPL |
| 382950 | 2004 VP_{10} | — | November 3, 2004 | Catalina | CSS | · | 1.9 km | MPC · JPL |
| 382951 | 2004 VB_{11} | — | November 3, 2004 | Catalina | CSS | JUN | 1.3 km | MPC · JPL |
| 382952 | 2004 VA_{13} | — | November 3, 2004 | Palomar | NEAT | · | 2.3 km | MPC · JPL |
| 382953 | 2004 VH_{16} | — | November 4, 2004 | Needville | J. Dellinger, D. Wells | · | 1.3 km | MPC · JPL |
| 382954 | 2004 VY_{24} | — | November 4, 2004 | Anderson Mesa | LONEOS | · | 1.6 km | MPC · JPL |
| 382955 | 2004 VJ_{31} | — | November 3, 2004 | Kitt Peak | Spacewatch | · | 1.3 km | MPC · JPL |
| 382956 | 2004 VG_{77} | — | November 12, 2004 | Catalina | CSS | · | 1.4 km | MPC · JPL |
| 382957 | 2004 VG_{90} | — | November 11, 2004 | Kitt Peak | Spacewatch | · | 2.0 km | MPC · JPL |
| 382958 | 2004 VD_{130} | — | November 9, 2004 | Catalina | CSS | · | 1.4 km | MPC · JPL |
| 382959 | 2004 XL_{17} | — | December 3, 2004 | Kitt Peak | Spacewatch | HNS | 1.7 km | MPC · JPL |
| 382960 | 2004 XM_{21} | — | December 8, 2004 | Socorro | LINEAR | · | 2.3 km | MPC · JPL |
| 382961 | 2004 XX_{23} | — | December 9, 2004 | Socorro | LINEAR | · | 3.3 km | MPC · JPL |
| 382962 | 2004 XK_{40} | — | December 10, 2004 | Socorro | LINEAR | · | 2.3 km | MPC · JPL |
| 382963 | 2004 XS_{44} | — | December 2, 2004 | Catalina | CSS | · | 2.5 km | MPC · JPL |
| 382964 | 2004 XH_{58} | — | December 10, 2004 | Kitt Peak | Spacewatch | MRX | 1.4 km | MPC · JPL |
| 382965 | 2004 XQ_{92} | — | December 11, 2004 | Socorro | LINEAR | · | 1.9 km | MPC · JPL |
| 382966 | 2004 XX_{96} | — | December 11, 2004 | Kitt Peak | Spacewatch | · | 2.0 km | MPC · JPL |
| 382967 | 2004 XQ_{120} | — | December 14, 2004 | Socorro | LINEAR | · | 1.8 km | MPC · JPL |
| 382968 | 2004 XH_{122} | — | December 9, 2004 | Vail-Jarnac | Jarnac | · | 1.5 km | MPC · JPL |
| 382969 | 2004 XH_{133} | — | December 15, 2004 | Kitt Peak | Spacewatch | MRX | 1.3 km | MPC · JPL |
| 382970 | 2004 XE_{135} | — | December 15, 2004 | Socorro | LINEAR | · | 3.2 km | MPC · JPL |
| 382971 | 2005 AX_{12} | — | January 6, 2005 | Socorro | LINEAR | · | 3.9 km | MPC · JPL |
| 382972 | 2005 AK_{26} | — | January 12, 2005 | Socorro | LINEAR | · | 2.3 km | MPC · JPL |
| 382973 | 2005 AP_{34} | — | December 20, 2004 | Mount Lemmon | Mount Lemmon Survey | GEF | 1.5 km | MPC · JPL |
| 382974 | 2005 AN_{40} | — | January 15, 2005 | Socorro | LINEAR | ADE | 2.7 km | MPC · JPL |
| 382975 | 2005 AL_{59} | — | January 15, 2005 | Socorro | LINEAR | MRX · | 1.1 km | MPC · JPL |
| 382976 | 2005 AG_{62} | — | January 15, 2005 | Kitt Peak | Spacewatch | · | 2.9 km | MPC · JPL |
| 382977 | 2005 AY_{70} | — | January 15, 2005 | Kitt Peak | Spacewatch | · | 2.1 km | MPC · JPL |
| 382978 | 2005 BW_{2} | — | January 18, 2005 | Sandlot | G. Hug | JUN | 1.5 km | MPC · JPL |
| 382979 | 2005 BK_{14} | — | January 20, 2005 | Wrightwood | J. W. Young | · | 2.1 km | MPC · JPL |
| 382980 | 2005 BD_{46} | — | January 16, 2005 | Mauna Kea | Veillet, C. | AGN | 1.2 km | MPC · JPL |
| 382981 | 2005 CA_{2} | — | February 1, 2005 | Palomar | NEAT | · | 4.7 km | MPC · JPL |
| 382982 | 2005 CR_{15} | — | February 2, 2005 | Socorro | LINEAR | · | 2.2 km | MPC · JPL |
| 382983 | 2005 CS_{19} | — | February 2, 2005 | Catalina | CSS | JUN | 1.1 km | MPC · JPL |
| 382984 | 2005 CU_{21} | — | February 3, 2005 | Socorro | LINEAR | · | 1.7 km | MPC · JPL |
| 382985 | 2005 CZ_{26} | — | February 1, 2005 | Kitt Peak | Spacewatch | GAL | 1.7 km | MPC · JPL |
| 382986 | 2005 CM_{37} | — | February 4, 2005 | Mayhill | Lowe, A. | · | 2.4 km | MPC · JPL |
| 382987 | 2005 EW_{10} | — | March 2, 2005 | Kitt Peak | Spacewatch | · | 2.1 km | MPC · JPL |
| 382988 | 2005 EW_{41} | — | March 2, 2005 | Kitt Peak | Spacewatch | · | 2.8 km | MPC · JPL |
| 382989 | 2005 EE_{50} | — | March 3, 2005 | Catalina | CSS | · | 2.0 km | MPC · JPL |
| 382990 | 2005 EN_{73} | — | March 3, 2005 | Kitt Peak | Spacewatch | · | 1.9 km | MPC · JPL |
| 382991 | 2005 EJ_{88} | — | March 8, 2005 | Anderson Mesa | LONEOS | · | 2.0 km | MPC · JPL |
| 382992 | 2005 EV_{157} | — | March 9, 2005 | Mount Lemmon | Mount Lemmon Survey | · | 1.7 km | MPC · JPL |
| 382993 | 2005 ED_{190} | — | March 11, 2005 | Mount Lemmon | Mount Lemmon Survey | · | 1.5 km | MPC · JPL |
| 382994 | 2005 EY_{291} | — | March 10, 2005 | Catalina | CSS | · | 2.6 km | MPC · JPL |
| 382995 | 2005 GO_{10} | — | April 1, 2005 | Kitt Peak | Spacewatch | · | 1.9 km | MPC · JPL |
| 382996 | 2005 GR_{227} | — | April 5, 2005 | Anderson Mesa | LONEOS | · | 800 m | MPC · JPL |
| 382997 | 2005 HY_{3} | — | April 28, 2005 | Mayhill | Lowe, A. | · | 1.3 km | MPC · JPL |
| 382998 | 2005 JL_{19} | — | May 4, 2005 | Kitt Peak | Spacewatch | · | 2.8 km | MPC · JPL |
| 382999 | 2005 JS_{80} | — | May 4, 2005 | Catalina | CSS | · | 4.6 km | MPC · JPL |
| 383000 | 2005 JH_{107} | — | May 12, 2005 | Mount Lemmon | Mount Lemmon Survey | · | 3.5 km | MPC · JPL |

back to top

== See also ==
- Meanings of minor-planet names: 382001–383000
