= List of minor planets: 379001–380000 =

The following is a partial list of minor planets, running from minor-planet number 379001 through 380000, inclusive. The primary data for this and other partial lists is based on JPL's "Small-Body Orbital Elements" and data available from the Minor Planet Center. Critical list information is also provided by the MPC, unless otherwise specified from Lowell Observatory. A detailed description of the table's columns and additional sources are given on the main page including a complete list of every page in this series, and a statistical break-up on the dynamical classification of minor planets.

Also see the summary list of all named bodies in numerical and alphabetical order, and the corresponding naming citations for the number range of this particular list. New namings may only be added to this list after official publication, as the preannouncement of names is condemned by the Working Group for Small Bodies Nomenclature of the International Astronomical Union.

Near-Earth obj.	MBA (inner)	MBA (outer)	Centaur
Mars-crosser	MBA (middle)	Jupiter trojan	Trans-Neptunian obj.
Unclassified

== 379001–379100 ==
Designation			Discovery			Properties		Ref
Permanent	Provisional	Named after	Date	Site	Discoverer(s)	Category	Diam.	Ref
379001	2008 UE_{335}	—	March 16, 2005	Mount Lemmon	Mount Lemmon Survey	·	2.7 km	MPC · JPL
379002	2008 UO_{336}	—	October 23, 2008	Kitt Peak	Spacewatch	·	2.0 km	MPC · JPL
379003	2008 UN_{340}	—	October 24, 2008	Kitt Peak	Spacewatch	·	1.9 km	MPC · JPL
379004	2008 UP_{344}	—	October 30, 2008	Kitt Peak	Spacewatch	·	1.5 km	MPC · JPL
379005	2008 UQ_{344}	—	October 30, 2008	Kitt Peak	Spacewatch	·	3.6 km	MPC · JPL
379006	2008 UY_{346}	—	October 31, 2008	Mount Lemmon	Mount Lemmon Survey	·	3.4 km	MPC · JPL
379007	2008 UZ_{347}	—	October 23, 2008	Kitt Peak	Spacewatch	·	2.0 km	MPC · JPL
379008	2008 UH_{349}	—	October 27, 2008	Mount Lemmon	Mount Lemmon Survey	·	2.8 km	MPC · JPL
379009	2008 UN_{350}	—	October 22, 2008	Kitt Peak	Spacewatch	·	1.8 km	MPC · JPL
379010	2008 UY_{352}	—	October 30, 2008	Kitt Peak	Spacewatch	·	3.6 km	MPC · JPL
379011	2008 UA_{354}	—	October 22, 2008	Kitt Peak	Spacewatch	·	4.4 km	MPC · JPL
379012	2008 UJ_{354}	—	October 24, 2008	Catalina	CSS	·	3.0 km	MPC · JPL
379013	2008 UJ_{359}	—	October 27, 2008	Mount Lemmon	Mount Lemmon Survey	·	2.4 km	MPC · JPL
379014	2008 UD_{369}	—	October 26, 2008	Kitt Peak	Spacewatch	GEF	1.7 km	MPC · JPL
379015	2008 UG_{369}	—	October 27, 2008	Mount Lemmon	Mount Lemmon Survey	·	3.1 km	MPC · JPL
379016	2008 VZ_{4}	—	November 4, 2008	Socorro	LINEAR	H	780 m	MPC · JPL
379017	2008 VJ_{7}	—	November 2, 2008	Mount Lemmon	Mount Lemmon Survey	·	2.4 km	MPC · JPL
379018	2008 VE_{19}	—	November 1, 2008	Kitt Peak	Spacewatch	KOR	1.5 km	MPC · JPL
379019	2008 VH_{21}	—	November 1, 2008	Mount Lemmon	Mount Lemmon Survey	·	3.0 km	MPC · JPL
379020	2008 VM_{23}	—	November 1, 2008	Kitt Peak	Spacewatch	·	3.8 km	MPC · JPL
379021	2008 VY_{34}	—	November 2, 2008	Mount Lemmon	Mount Lemmon Survey	·	5.8 km	MPC · JPL
379022	2008 VP_{35}	—	November 2, 2008	Kitt Peak	Spacewatch	EOS	2.0 km	MPC · JPL
379023	2008 VW_{35}	—	October 25, 2008	Kitt Peak	Spacewatch	EOS	2.0 km	MPC · JPL
379024	2008 VR_{38}	—	November 2, 2008	Kitt Peak	Spacewatch	·	1.6 km	MPC · JPL
379025	2008 VE_{39}	—	November 2, 2008	Kitt Peak	Spacewatch	·	1.9 km	MPC · JPL
379026	2008 VJ_{39}	—	November 2, 2008	Mount Lemmon	Mount Lemmon Survey	·	4.7 km	MPC · JPL
379027	2008 VP_{44}	—	November 3, 2008	Mount Lemmon	Mount Lemmon Survey	·	1.8 km	MPC · JPL
379028	2008 VN_{46}	—	November 3, 2008	Kitt Peak	Spacewatch	·	4.4 km	MPC · JPL
379029	2008 VP_{51}	—	November 5, 2008	Kitt Peak	Spacewatch	·	1.8 km	MPC · JPL
379030	2008 VA_{59}	—	November 7, 2008	Mount Lemmon	Mount Lemmon Survey	EOS	2.3 km	MPC · JPL
379031	2008 VW_{60}	—	October 20, 2008	Kitt Peak	Spacewatch	KOR	1.4 km	MPC · JPL
379032	2008 VS_{70}	—	November 8, 2008	Kitt Peak	Spacewatch	·	1.6 km	MPC · JPL
379033	2008 VV_{70}	—	November 8, 2008	Kitt Peak	Spacewatch	VER	3.3 km	MPC · JPL
379034	2008 VJ_{73}	—	March 11, 2005	Mount Lemmon	Mount Lemmon Survey	·	3.2 km	MPC · JPL
379035	2008 VL_{76}	—	November 7, 2008	Catalina	CSS	·	3.8 km	MPC · JPL
379036	2008 VG_{77}	—	November 2, 2008	Mount Lemmon	Mount Lemmon Survey	·	3.1 km	MPC · JPL
379037	2008 WV_{9}	—	November 17, 2008	Kitt Peak	Spacewatch	THM	2.6 km	MPC · JPL
379038	2008 WC_{13}	—	November 19, 2008	Socorro	LINEAR	H	460 m	MPC · JPL
379039	2008 WA_{15}	—	November 17, 2008	Kitt Peak	Spacewatch	KOR	1.5 km	MPC · JPL
379040	2008 WO_{18}	—	November 17, 2008	Kitt Peak	Spacewatch	·	1.9 km	MPC · JPL
379041	2008 WW_{19}	—	November 17, 2008	Kitt Peak	Spacewatch	KOR	1.4 km	MPC · JPL
379042	2008 WV_{23}	—	October 20, 2008	Kitt Peak	Spacewatch	·	2.4 km	MPC · JPL
379043	2008 WM_{25}	—	November 18, 2008	Kitt Peak	Spacewatch	KOR	1.3 km	MPC · JPL
379044	2008 WR_{25}	—	November 18, 2008	Kitt Peak	Spacewatch	KOR	1.2 km	MPC · JPL
379045	2008 WF_{29}	—	October 9, 2008	Mount Lemmon	Mount Lemmon Survey	·	3.0 km	MPC · JPL
379046	2008 WU_{29}	—	November 19, 2008	Mount Lemmon	Mount Lemmon Survey	VER	4.0 km	MPC · JPL
379047	2008 WV_{31}	—	November 19, 2008	Mount Lemmon	Mount Lemmon Survey	·	1.5 km	MPC · JPL
379048	2008 WL_{33}	—	November 21, 2008	Socorro	LINEAR	·	2.3 km	MPC · JPL
379049	2008 WB_{37}	—	November 17, 2008	Kitt Peak	Spacewatch	·	2.1 km	MPC · JPL
379050	2008 WE_{42}	—	November 17, 2008	Kitt Peak	Spacewatch	·	2.4 km	MPC · JPL
379051	2008 WD_{43}	—	April 8, 2006	Kitt Peak	Spacewatch	·	1.8 km	MPC · JPL
379052	2008 WT_{45}	—	November 17, 2008	Kitt Peak	Spacewatch	·	5.9 km	MPC · JPL
379053	2008 WC_{47}	—	October 22, 2008	Kitt Peak	Spacewatch	·	2.8 km	MPC · JPL
379054	2008 WO_{48}	—	October 23, 2003	Kitt Peak	Spacewatch	·	2.4 km	MPC · JPL
379055	2008 WA_{49}	—	November 18, 2008	Catalina	CSS	·	1.9 km	MPC · JPL
379056	2008 WK_{53}	—	November 19, 2008	Kitt Peak	Spacewatch	·	2.4 km	MPC · JPL
379057	2008 WJ_{58}	—	November 20, 2008	Mount Lemmon	Mount Lemmon Survey	·	3.1 km	MPC · JPL
379058	2008 WG_{64}	—	November 18, 2008	Catalina	CSS	·	4.3 km	MPC · JPL
379059	2008 WN_{65}	—	November 17, 2008	Catalina	CSS	·	2.3 km	MPC · JPL
379060	2008 WV_{66}	—	October 25, 2008	Mount Lemmon	Mount Lemmon Survey	·	2.8 km	MPC · JPL
379061	2008 WY_{73}	—	November 19, 2008	Mount Lemmon	Mount Lemmon Survey	·	2.3 km	MPC · JPL
379062	2008 WU_{76}	—	November 20, 2008	Kitt Peak	Spacewatch	EOS	2.0 km	MPC · JPL
379063	2008 WY_{79}	—	November 2, 2008	Mount Lemmon	Mount Lemmon Survey	·	1.9 km	MPC · JPL
379064	2008 WN_{83}	—	November 20, 2008	Kitt Peak	Spacewatch	·	2.6 km	MPC · JPL
379065	2008 WN_{86}	—	November 21, 2008	Kitt Peak	Spacewatch	·	2.0 km	MPC · JPL
379066	2008 WN_{88}	—	November 21, 2008	Kitt Peak	Spacewatch	·	3.8 km	MPC · JPL
379067	2008 WY_{91}	—	November 24, 2008	Dauban	Kugel, F.	·	2.0 km	MPC · JPL
379068	2008 WD_{92}	—	November 24, 2008	Dauban	Kugel, F.	·	4.2 km	MPC · JPL
379069	2008 WW_{99}	—	October 6, 2008	Mount Lemmon	Mount Lemmon Survey	·	2.3 km	MPC · JPL
379070	2008 WS_{103}	—	November 30, 2008	Mount Lemmon	Mount Lemmon Survey	·	2.0 km	MPC · JPL
379071	2008 WK_{107}	—	November 30, 2008	Mount Lemmon	Mount Lemmon Survey	KOR	1.3 km	MPC · JPL
379072	2008 WZ_{113}	—	November 30, 2008	Kitt Peak	Spacewatch	·	5.2 km	MPC · JPL
379073	2008 WD_{115}	—	November 30, 2008	Mount Lemmon	Mount Lemmon Survey	THM	2.2 km	MPC · JPL
379074	2008 WS_{119}	—	November 30, 2008	Mount Lemmon	Mount Lemmon Survey	·	4.0 km	MPC · JPL
379075	2008 WR_{125}	—	November 24, 2008	Mount Lemmon	Mount Lemmon Survey	·	2.7 km	MPC · JPL
379076	2008 WT_{125}	—	November 30, 2008	Kitt Peak	Spacewatch	·	2.4 km	MPC · JPL
379077	2008 WV_{125}	—	November 21, 2008	Mount Lemmon	Mount Lemmon Survey	THM	2.1 km	MPC · JPL
379078	2008 WE_{128}	—	November 18, 2008	Kitt Peak	Spacewatch	·	2.7 km	MPC · JPL
379079	2008 WW_{131}	—	November 19, 2008	Catalina	CSS	·	2.7 km	MPC · JPL
379080	2008 WG_{133}	—	November 19, 2008	Kitt Peak	Spacewatch	·	2.9 km	MPC · JPL
379081	2008 WJ_{135}	—	November 18, 2008	Kitt Peak	Spacewatch	·	1.9 km	MPC · JPL
379082	2008 WF_{137}	—	November 22, 2008	Kitt Peak	Spacewatch	EOS	2.8 km	MPC · JPL
379083	2008 WX_{138}	—	November 24, 2008	Socorro	LINEAR	·	5.0 km	MPC · JPL
379084	2008 WS_{139}	—	November 21, 2008	Catalina	CSS	T_{j} (2.99)	5.6 km	MPC · JPL
379085	2008 XZ_{1}	—	December 4, 2008	Catalina	CSS	T_{j} (2.97)	4.5 km	MPC · JPL
379086	2008 XG_{11}	—	November 7, 2008	Mount Lemmon	Mount Lemmon Survey	·	3.3 km	MPC · JPL
379087	2008 XR_{15}	—	December 3, 2008	Mount Lemmon	Mount Lemmon Survey	·	2.1 km	MPC · JPL
379088	2008 XL_{17}	—	November 19, 2008	Kitt Peak	Spacewatch	·	3.1 km	MPC · JPL
379089	2008 XY_{20}	—	December 1, 2008	Kitt Peak	Spacewatch	·	3.4 km	MPC · JPL
379090	2008 XY_{27}	—	April 25, 2000	Kitt Peak	Spacewatch	·	3.0 km	MPC · JPL
379091	2008 XE_{29}	—	December 4, 2008	Kitt Peak	Spacewatch	VER	3.0 km	MPC · JPL
379092	2008 XM_{31}	—	December 2, 2008	Kitt Peak	Spacewatch	·	2.0 km	MPC · JPL
379093	2008 XK_{45}	—	December 3, 2008	Kitt Peak	Spacewatch	·	2.7 km	MPC · JPL
379094	2008 XL_{53}	—	December 6, 2008	Mount Lemmon	Mount Lemmon Survey	·	3.3 km	MPC · JPL
379095	2008 XQ_{55}	—	December 6, 2008	Kitt Peak	Spacewatch	·	2.4 km	MPC · JPL
379096	2008 YD	—	October 10, 2008	Mount Lemmon	Mount Lemmon Survey	slow	2.9 km	MPC · JPL
379097	2008 YO_{5}	—	December 22, 2008	Marly	P. Kocher	·	2.4 km	MPC · JPL
379098	2008 YV_{5}	—	December 21, 2008	Črni Vrh	J. Zakrajšek, H. Mikuž	T_{j} (2.98)	4.1 km	MPC · JPL
379099	2008 YE_{6}	—	November 20, 2001	Socorro	LINEAR	·	780 m	MPC · JPL
379100	2008 YQ_{7}	—	December 20, 2008	La Sagra	OAM	·	2.3 km	MPC · JPL

== 379101–379200 ==
back to top

Designation			Discovery			Properties		Ref
Permanent	Provisional	Named after	Date	Site	Discoverer(s)	Category	Diam.	Ref
379101	2008 YE_{12}	—	December 21, 2008	Mount Lemmon	Mount Lemmon Survey	VER	3.7 km	MPC · JPL
379102	2008 YF_{13}	—	November 8, 2008	Mount Lemmon	Mount Lemmon Survey	·	3.5 km	MPC · JPL
379103	2008 YS_{13}	—	December 21, 2008	Mount Lemmon	Mount Lemmon Survey	T_{j} (2.99)	7.9 km	MPC · JPL
379104	2008 YL_{14}	—	November 30, 2008	Kitt Peak	Spacewatch	·	2.9 km	MPC · JPL
379105	2008 YU_{22}	—	December 21, 2008	Mount Lemmon	Mount Lemmon Survey	·	4.4 km	MPC · JPL
379106	2008 YW_{23}	—	December 21, 2008	La Sagra	OAM	T_{j} (2.98)	5.1 km	MPC · JPL
379107	2008 YL_{25}	—	December 22, 2008	Catalina	CSS	·	4.3 km	MPC · JPL
379108	2008 YY_{40}	—	December 30, 2008	Mount Lemmon	Mount Lemmon Survey	(1298)	3.2 km	MPC · JPL
379109	2008 YE_{41}	—	December 30, 2008	Catalina	CSS	·	4.0 km	MPC · JPL
379110	2008 YW_{55}	—	December 30, 2008	Kitt Peak	Spacewatch	·	3.3 km	MPC · JPL
379111	2008 YU_{60}	—	December 30, 2008	Mount Lemmon	Mount Lemmon Survey	·	3.4 km	MPC · JPL
379112	2008 YD_{64}	—	December 30, 2008	Mount Lemmon	Mount Lemmon Survey	·	4.5 km	MPC · JPL
379113	2008 YN_{108}	—	December 29, 2008	Kitt Peak	Spacewatch	HYG	3.0 km	MPC · JPL
379114	2008 YG_{125}	—	December 30, 2008	Kitt Peak	Spacewatch	CYB	4.4 km	MPC · JPL
379115	2008 YZ_{127}	—	December 30, 2008	Kitt Peak	Spacewatch	·	3.3 km	MPC · JPL
379116	2008 YX_{135}	—	December 30, 2008	Kitt Peak	Spacewatch	·	2.9 km	MPC · JPL
379117	2008 YT_{136}	—	December 30, 2008	Kitt Peak	Spacewatch	·	3.8 km	MPC · JPL
379118	2008 YA_{138}	—	December 30, 2008	Kitt Peak	Spacewatch	THM	2.3 km	MPC · JPL
379119	2008 YL_{171}	—	December 30, 2008	Socorro	LINEAR	·	2.6 km	MPC · JPL
379120	2009 AD_{15}	—	January 2, 2009	Mount Lemmon	Mount Lemmon Survey	·	2.2 km	MPC · JPL
379121	2009 AO_{21}	—	January 3, 2009	Kitt Peak	Spacewatch	THM	2.4 km	MPC · JPL
379122	2009 AD_{35}	—	January 15, 2009	Kitt Peak	Spacewatch	·	3.5 km	MPC · JPL
379123	2009 AD_{48}	—	January 1, 2009	Kitt Peak	Spacewatch	·	2.0 km	MPC · JPL
379124	2009 BE_{10}	—	January 20, 2009	Bergisch Gladbach	W. Bickel	·	2.5 km	MPC · JPL
379125	2009 BT_{14}	—	January 16, 2009	Kitt Peak	Spacewatch	·	3.1 km	MPC · JPL
379126	2009 BN_{31}	—	January 16, 2009	Kitt Peak	Spacewatch	·	3.2 km	MPC · JPL
379127	2009 BY_{74}	—	January 20, 2009	Catalina	CSS	·	4.8 km	MPC · JPL
379128	2009 BW_{135}	—	November 5, 2007	Mount Lemmon	Mount Lemmon Survey	CYB	3.7 km	MPC · JPL
379129	2009 BV_{183}	—	January 20, 2009	Catalina	CSS	·	3.6 km	MPC · JPL
379130 Lopresti	2009 CA_{20}	Lopresti	February 15, 2009	San Marcello	L. Tesi, Fagioli, G.	·	3.6 km	MPC · JPL
379131	2009 CL_{40}	—	February 13, 2009	Kitt Peak	Spacewatch	·	3.2 km	MPC · JPL
379132	2009 CX_{42}	—	February 14, 2009	Mount Lemmon	Mount Lemmon Survey	DOR	3.4 km	MPC · JPL
379133	2009 CL_{45}	—	February 14, 2009	Kitt Peak	Spacewatch	·	2.5 km	MPC · JPL
379134	2009 CJ_{53}	—	February 13, 2009	La Sagra	OAM	·	4.8 km	MPC · JPL
379135	2009 CR_{55}	—	February 14, 2009	Catalina	CSS	T_{j} (2.98)	4.1 km	MPC · JPL
379136	2009 DL_{22}	—	February 19, 2009	Kitt Peak	Spacewatch	3:2	5.9 km	MPC · JPL
379137	2009 DA_{24}	—	February 21, 2009	Mount Lemmon	Mount Lemmon Survey	·	3.7 km	MPC · JPL
379138	2009 DE_{51}	—	February 20, 2009	Catalina	CSS	H	620 m	MPC · JPL
379139	2009 DS_{124}	—	February 19, 2009	Kitt Peak	Spacewatch	·	770 m	MPC · JPL
379140	2009 EK_{16}	—	February 19, 2009	Catalina	CSS	·	890 m	MPC · JPL
379141	2009 EF_{26}	—	March 15, 2009	Kitt Peak	Spacewatch	3:2	5.5 km	MPC · JPL
379142	2009 FR_{40}	—	March 17, 2009	Kitt Peak	Spacewatch	HIL · 3:2 · (6124)	6.6 km	MPC · JPL
379143	2009 HU_{11}	—	April 19, 2009	Kitt Peak	Spacewatch	L5	14 km	MPC · JPL
379144	2009 HV_{11}	—	April 17, 2009	Catalina	CSS	H	670 m	MPC · JPL
379145	2009 HP_{55}	—	April 21, 2009	Kitt Peak	Spacewatch	·	630 m	MPC · JPL
379146	2009 OM	—	July 16, 2009	La Sagra	OAM	·	880 m	MPC · JPL
379147	2009 OF_{4}	—	July 24, 2009	Sierra Stars	R. Matson	·	810 m	MPC · JPL
379148	2009 PR_{6}	—	August 15, 2009	Kitt Peak	Spacewatch	·	940 m	MPC · JPL
379149	2009 PH_{10}	—	August 15, 2009	La Sagra	OAM	·	1.2 km	MPC · JPL
379150	2009 PK_{12}	—	August 15, 2009	Catalina	CSS	NYS	1.3 km	MPC · JPL
379151	2009 PA_{17}	—	August 14, 2009	Siding Spring	SSS	PHO	1.6 km	MPC · JPL
379152	2009 PE_{21}	—	August 15, 2009	Catalina	CSS	·	1.3 km	MPC · JPL
379153	2009 QV_{1}	—	March 31, 2008	Mount Lemmon	Mount Lemmon Survey	NYS	1.1 km	MPC · JPL
379154	2009 QU_{4}	—	August 16, 2009	La Sagra	OAM	·	910 m	MPC · JPL
379155 Volkerheinrich	2009 QR_{6}	Volkerheinrich	August 18, 2009	Tzec Maun	E. Schwab	·	1.1 km	MPC · JPL
379156	2009 QN_{8}	—	August 17, 2009	Socorro	LINEAR	·	1.5 km	MPC · JPL
379157	2009 QB_{11}	—	August 16, 2009	Kitt Peak	Spacewatch	·	1.6 km	MPC · JPL
379158	2009 QO_{12}	—	August 16, 2009	Kitt Peak	Spacewatch	·	1.2 km	MPC · JPL
379159	2009 QW_{12}	—	August 16, 2009	Kitt Peak	Spacewatch	NYS	1.1 km	MPC · JPL
379160	2009 QA_{17}	—	August 17, 2009	La Sagra	OAM	NYS	1.3 km	MPC · JPL
379161	2009 QL_{19}	—	August 18, 2009	Kitt Peak	Spacewatch	·	1.2 km	MPC · JPL
379162	2009 QY_{21}	—	June 16, 2005	Mount Lemmon	Mount Lemmon Survey	·	1.1 km	MPC · JPL
379163	2009 QS_{22}	—	August 20, 2009	La Sagra	OAM	NYS	1.1 km	MPC · JPL
379164	2009 QG_{39}	—	August 20, 2009	Kitt Peak	Spacewatch	NYS	890 m	MPC · JPL
379165	2009 QR_{40}	—	April 6, 2008	Mount Lemmon	Mount Lemmon Survey	·	1.2 km	MPC · JPL
379166	2009 QV_{42}	—	August 26, 2009	Catalina	CSS	·	1.3 km	MPC · JPL
379167	2009 QK_{53}	—	August 16, 2009	Kitt Peak	Spacewatch	NYS	1.0 km	MPC · JPL
379168	2009 QO_{53}	—	August 16, 2009	Kitt Peak	Spacewatch	·	1.6 km	MPC · JPL
379169	2009 QP_{53}	—	August 16, 2009	Kitt Peak	Spacewatch	·	1.5 km	MPC · JPL
379170	2009 QJ_{55}	—	August 28, 2009	Kitt Peak	Spacewatch	·	1.1 km	MPC · JPL
379171	2009 QM_{57}	—	August 16, 2009	Kitt Peak	Spacewatch	·	1.0 km	MPC · JPL
379172	2009 QY_{57}	—	August 16, 2009	Kitt Peak	Spacewatch	·	1.4 km	MPC · JPL
379173 Gamaovalia	2009 RA_{2}	Gamaovalia	September 10, 2009	ESA OGS	Busch, M., Kresken, R.	EUN	1.5 km	MPC · JPL
379174	2009 RY_{2}	—	August 28, 2009	Catalina	CSS	·	1.7 km	MPC · JPL
379175	2009 RT_{3}	—	September 13, 2009	Kachina	Hobart, J.	·	1.0 km	MPC · JPL
379176	2009 RD_{6}	—	September 13, 2009	Dauban	Kugel, F.	·	1.5 km	MPC · JPL
379177	2009 RC_{8}	—	September 12, 2009	Kitt Peak	Spacewatch	·	920 m	MPC · JPL
379178	2009 RF_{11}	—	September 12, 2009	Kitt Peak	Spacewatch	MAS	780 m	MPC · JPL
379179	2009 RK_{13}	—	September 12, 2009	Kitt Peak	Spacewatch	·	1.2 km	MPC · JPL
379180	2009 RV_{18}	—	August 20, 2009	Kitt Peak	Spacewatch	·	980 m	MPC · JPL
379181	2009 RL_{19}	—	September 14, 2009	La Sagra	OAM	NYS	1.2 km	MPC · JPL
379182	2009 RQ_{19}	—	August 16, 2009	Kitt Peak	Spacewatch	·	1.1 km	MPC · JPL
379183	2009 RB_{32}	—	September 14, 2009	Kitt Peak	Spacewatch	·	1.6 km	MPC · JPL
379184	2009 RR_{39}	—	September 15, 2009	Kitt Peak	Spacewatch	·	1.3 km	MPC · JPL
379185	2009 RP_{52}	—	September 15, 2009	Kitt Peak	Spacewatch	·	1.8 km	MPC · JPL
379186	2009 RH_{59}	—	September 15, 2009	Kitt Peak	Spacewatch	·	1.2 km	MPC · JPL
379187	2009 RV_{63}	—	September 15, 2009	Kitt Peak	Spacewatch	L4	10 km	MPC · JPL
379188	2009 RF_{69}	—	August 17, 2009	Catalina	CSS	·	1.7 km	MPC · JPL
379189	2009 RO_{69}	—	September 15, 2009	Mount Lemmon	Mount Lemmon Survey	·	1.4 km	MPC · JPL
379190	2009 SE_{14}	—	December 12, 2006	Mount Lemmon	Mount Lemmon Survey	·	990 m	MPC · JPL
379191	2009 SG_{15}	—	August 26, 2009	Catalina	CSS	·	1.3 km	MPC · JPL
379192	2009 SG_{16}	—	September 20, 2009	Mayhill	Lowe, A.	·	1.3 km	MPC · JPL
379193	2009 SH_{17}	—	August 27, 2009	Kitt Peak	Spacewatch	·	1.3 km	MPC · JPL
379194	2009 SD_{26}	—	September 16, 2009	Kitt Peak	Spacewatch	·	1.7 km	MPC · JPL
379195	2009 SO_{29}	—	September 16, 2009	Kitt Peak	Spacewatch	·	1.4 km	MPC · JPL
379196	2009 SD_{38}	—	September 16, 2009	Kitt Peak	Spacewatch	·	1.6 km	MPC · JPL
379197	2009 SR_{45}	—	September 16, 2009	Kitt Peak	Spacewatch	·	1.7 km	MPC · JPL
379198	2009 SD_{52}	—	April 22, 2004	Siding Spring	SSS	EUN	1.4 km	MPC · JPL
379199	2009 SF_{53}	—	September 17, 2009	Catalina	CSS	·	1.5 km	MPC · JPL
379200	2009 SP_{58}	—	September 17, 2009	Kitt Peak	Spacewatch	·	1.1 km	MPC · JPL

== 379201–379300 ==
back to top

Designation			Discovery			Properties		Ref
Permanent	Provisional	Named after	Date	Site	Discoverer(s)	Category	Diam.	Ref
379201	2009 SO_{59}	—	September 17, 2009	Kitt Peak	Spacewatch	·	1.8 km	MPC · JPL
379202	2009 SG_{63}	—	August 16, 2009	Kitt Peak	Spacewatch	·	1.2 km	MPC · JPL
379203	2009 SF_{66}	—	September 17, 2009	Kitt Peak	Spacewatch	NYS	1.4 km	MPC · JPL
379204	2009 SO_{70}	—	October 24, 2005	Kitt Peak	Spacewatch	·	1.6 km	MPC · JPL
379205	2009 ST_{87}	—	September 18, 2009	Kitt Peak	Spacewatch	MAS	770 m	MPC · JPL
379206	2009 SK_{96}	—	September 19, 2009	Mount Lemmon	Mount Lemmon Survey	·	1.7 km	MPC · JPL
379207	2009 ST_{101}	—	September 24, 2009	Vail-Jarnac	Jarnac	·	1.2 km	MPC · JPL
379208	2009 SL_{122}	—	September 18, 2009	Kitt Peak	Spacewatch	·	1.0 km	MPC · JPL
379209	2009 SD_{124}	—	September 18, 2009	Kitt Peak	Spacewatch	·	1.7 km	MPC · JPL
379210	2009 SO_{125}	—	September 18, 2009	Kitt Peak	Spacewatch	·	1.5 km	MPC · JPL
379211	2009 SR_{130}	—	September 18, 2009	Kitt Peak	Spacewatch	·	1.2 km	MPC · JPL
379212	2009 SZ_{130}	—	September 18, 2009	Kitt Peak	Spacewatch	·	1.2 km	MPC · JPL
379213	2009 SG_{134}	—	September 18, 2009	Kitt Peak	Spacewatch	·	1.6 km	MPC · JPL
379214	2009 SY_{134}	—	September 18, 2009	Kitt Peak	Spacewatch	·	1.0 km	MPC · JPL
379215	2009 SC_{141}	—	September 19, 2009	Kitt Peak	Spacewatch	NYS	1.1 km	MPC · JPL
379216	2009 SW_{153}	—	September 20, 2009	Kitt Peak	Spacewatch	·	1.0 km	MPC · JPL
379217	2009 SY_{156}	—	September 20, 2009	Kitt Peak	Spacewatch	·	1.1 km	MPC · JPL
379218	2009 SB_{182}	—	September 21, 2009	Mount Lemmon	Mount Lemmon Survey	MAS	700 m	MPC · JPL
379219	2009 SG_{184}	—	September 21, 2009	Kitt Peak	Spacewatch	EUN	1.5 km	MPC · JPL
379220	2009 SP_{184}	—	September 21, 2009	Kitt Peak	Spacewatch	V	750 m	MPC · JPL
379221	2009 SY_{192}	—	September 22, 2009	Kitt Peak	Spacewatch	·	1.1 km	MPC · JPL
379222	2009 SJ_{193}	—	September 22, 2009	Kitt Peak	Spacewatch	·	1.2 km	MPC · JPL
379223	2009 SM_{201}	—	September 22, 2009	Kitt Peak	Spacewatch	·	1.1 km	MPC · JPL
379224	2009 SQ_{213}	—	September 23, 2009	Kitt Peak	Spacewatch	·	1.0 km	MPC · JPL
379225	2009 SZ_{214}	—	September 23, 2009	Kitt Peak	Spacewatch	(5)	1.0 km	MPC · JPL
379226	2009 SV_{217}	—	September 24, 2009	Mount Lemmon	Mount Lemmon Survey	·	1.2 km	MPC · JPL
379227	2009 SJ_{230}	—	September 16, 2009	Catalina	CSS	·	1.7 km	MPC · JPL
379228	2009 SN_{233}	—	September 20, 2009	Kitt Peak	Spacewatch	PHO	1.1 km	MPC · JPL
379229	2009 SV_{240}	—	September 18, 2009	Catalina	CSS	·	2.5 km	MPC · JPL
379230	2009 SG_{253}	—	September 22, 2009	Mount Lemmon	Mount Lemmon Survey	·	1.8 km	MPC · JPL
379231	2009 SO_{264}	—	January 4, 2003	Kitt Peak	Spacewatch	·	1.2 km	MPC · JPL
379232	2009 SJ_{269}	—	September 24, 2009	Kitt Peak	Spacewatch	MAS	640 m	MPC · JPL
379233	2009 ST_{273}	—	September 17, 2009	Kitt Peak	Spacewatch	MAS	710 m	MPC · JPL
379234	2009 SP_{274}	—	September 16, 2009	Kitt Peak	Spacewatch	·	1.1 km	MPC · JPL
379235	2009 SU_{275}	—	September 25, 2009	Kitt Peak	Spacewatch	MAS	550 m	MPC · JPL
379236	2009 SN_{276}	—	September 17, 2009	Kitt Peak	Spacewatch	·	990 m	MPC · JPL
379237	2009 SP_{278}	—	September 25, 2009	Kitt Peak	Spacewatch	·	1.2 km	MPC · JPL
379238	2009 SC_{280}	—	September 17, 2009	Kitt Peak	Spacewatch	·	1.3 km	MPC · JPL
379239	2009 SE_{300}	—	September 22, 2009	Mount Lemmon	Mount Lemmon Survey	·	980 m	MPC · JPL
379240	2009 SE_{320}	—	September 20, 2009	Mount Lemmon	Mount Lemmon Survey	·	1.4 km	MPC · JPL
379241	2009 SA_{338}	—	September 28, 2009	Catalina	CSS	·	1.7 km	MPC · JPL
379242	2009 SW_{341}	—	September 16, 2009	Kitt Peak	Spacewatch	·	780 m	MPC · JPL
379243	2009 SJ_{349}	—	April 15, 2007	Catalina	CSS	HNS	1.5 km	MPC · JPL
379244	2009 SW_{349}	—	September 22, 2009	Mount Lemmon	Mount Lemmon Survey	·	2.5 km	MPC · JPL
379245	2009 SZ_{354}	—	September 22, 2009	Mount Lemmon	Mount Lemmon Survey	·	930 m	MPC · JPL
379246	2009 SJ_{355}	—	September 20, 2009	Mount Lemmon	Mount Lemmon Survey	·	2.0 km	MPC · JPL
379247	2009 TY_{8}	—	October 11, 2009	Mount Lemmon	Mount Lemmon Survey	·	1.2 km	MPC · JPL
379248	2009 TK_{15}	—	October 15, 2009	Taunus	Karge, S., R. Kling	·	1.3 km	MPC · JPL
379249	2009 TZ_{17}	—	October 15, 2009	Catalina	CSS	EUN	1.4 km	MPC · JPL
379250	2009 TR_{18}	—	September 18, 2009	Kitt Peak	Spacewatch	·	1.1 km	MPC · JPL
379251	2009 TW_{19}	—	October 11, 2009	Mount Lemmon	Mount Lemmon Survey	·	930 m	MPC · JPL
379252	2009 TA_{38}	—	October 14, 2009	Catalina	CSS	·	1.2 km	MPC · JPL
379253	2009 TG_{38}	—	September 28, 2009	Mount Lemmon	Mount Lemmon Survey	(194)	3.1 km	MPC · JPL
379254	2009 TT_{39}	—	October 14, 2009	Catalina	CSS	·	2.0 km	MPC · JPL
379255	2009 TH_{43}	—	October 2, 2009	Mount Lemmon	Mount Lemmon Survey	·	1.3 km	MPC · JPL
379256	2009 TZ_{47}	—	August 31, 2005	Campo Imperatore	CINEOS	V	580 m	MPC · JPL
379257	2009 UR_{2}	—	October 16, 2009	Dauban	Kugel, F.	·	1.7 km	MPC · JPL
379258	2009 UT_{16}	—	October 17, 2009	La Sagra	OAM	·	850 m	MPC · JPL
379259	2009 UP_{19}	—	October 23, 2009	BlackBird	Levin, K.	·	2.0 km	MPC · JPL
379260	2009 UJ_{23}	—	October 18, 2009	Mount Lemmon	Mount Lemmon Survey	·	1.4 km	MPC · JPL
379261	2009 UU_{30}	—	October 18, 2009	Mount Lemmon	Mount Lemmon Survey	·	1.5 km	MPC · JPL
379262	2009 UJ_{44}	—	October 18, 2009	Mount Lemmon	Mount Lemmon Survey	RAF	1.3 km	MPC · JPL
379263	2009 UZ_{44}	—	January 25, 2007	Kitt Peak	Spacewatch	·	1.2 km	MPC · JPL
379264	2009 UW_{47}	—	October 19, 2009	Kitt Peak	Spacewatch	·	2.1 km	MPC · JPL
379265	2009 UO_{48}	—	October 22, 2009	Mount Lemmon	Mount Lemmon Survey	·	1.1 km	MPC · JPL
379266	2009 UF_{51}	—	October 22, 2009	Catalina	CSS	·	2.0 km	MPC · JPL
379267	2009 UF_{61}	—	October 17, 2009	Mount Lemmon	Mount Lemmon Survey	NYS	1.1 km	MPC · JPL
379268	2009 UE_{81}	—	October 22, 2009	Catalina	CSS	·	950 m	MPC · JPL
379269	2009 UA_{88}	—	September 30, 2005	Mount Lemmon	Mount Lemmon Survey	MAR	1.2 km	MPC · JPL
379270	2009 UW_{88}	—	October 24, 2009	Catalina	CSS	·	1.1 km	MPC · JPL
379271	2009 UG_{98}	—	October 23, 2009	Mount Lemmon	Mount Lemmon Survey	·	1.2 km	MPC · JPL
379272	2009 UJ_{98}	—	October 23, 2009	Mount Lemmon	Mount Lemmon Survey	·	1.2 km	MPC · JPL
379273	2009 UN_{98}	—	October 23, 2009	Mount Lemmon	Mount Lemmon Survey	V	670 m	MPC · JPL
379274	2009 UN_{100}	—	November 4, 2005	Mount Lemmon	Mount Lemmon Survey	·	1.1 km	MPC · JPL
379275	2009 UT_{111}	—	October 24, 2009	Catalina	CSS	·	1.3 km	MPC · JPL
379276	2009 UL_{114}	—	October 21, 2009	Mount Lemmon	Mount Lemmon Survey	MAS	720 m	MPC · JPL
379277	2009 UD_{127}	—	October 22, 2009	Catalina	CSS	(194)	2.5 km	MPC · JPL
379278	2009 UP_{131}	—	October 27, 2009	Mount Lemmon	Mount Lemmon Survey	·	3.5 km	MPC · JPL
379279	2009 UQ_{138}	—	October 22, 2009	Mount Lemmon	Mount Lemmon Survey	(5)	1.2 km	MPC · JPL
379280	2009 UP_{146}	—	October 16, 2009	Mount Lemmon	Mount Lemmon Survey	·	1.9 km	MPC · JPL
379281	2009 UU_{146}	—	October 24, 2009	Kitt Peak	Spacewatch	EUN	1.2 km	MPC · JPL
379282	2009 UX_{146}	—	October 30, 2009	Mount Lemmon	Mount Lemmon Survey	·	1.4 km	MPC · JPL
379283	2009 VF_{1}	—	November 9, 2009	Tzec Maun	D. Chestnov, A. Novichonok	·	3.4 km	MPC · JPL
379284	2009 VZ_{1}	—	February 21, 2007	Mount Lemmon	Mount Lemmon Survey	EUN	2.2 km	MPC · JPL
379285	2009 VB_{10}	—	September 21, 2009	Mount Lemmon	Mount Lemmon Survey	·	1.4 km	MPC · JPL
379286	2009 VD_{10}	—	September 19, 2009	Mount Lemmon	Mount Lemmon Survey	·	1.0 km	MPC · JPL
379287	2009 VU_{16}	—	November 8, 2009	Mount Lemmon	Mount Lemmon Survey	·	2.1 km	MPC · JPL
379288	2009 VO_{27}	—	November 8, 2009	Kitt Peak	Spacewatch	MAR	1.1 km	MPC · JPL
379289	2009 VU_{30}	—	November 9, 2009	Mount Lemmon	Mount Lemmon Survey	ADE	2.8 km	MPC · JPL
379290	2009 VH_{37}	—	October 25, 2009	Kitt Peak	Spacewatch	·	1.5 km	MPC · JPL
379291	2009 VM_{38}	—	October 24, 2009	Kitt Peak	Spacewatch	·	1.6 km	MPC · JPL
379292	2009 VB_{43}	—	September 22, 1996	Xinglong	SCAP	·	1.3 km	MPC · JPL
379293	2009 VK_{44}	—	November 12, 2009	Hibiscus	Teamo, N.	(5)	930 m	MPC · JPL
379294	2009 VO_{44}	—	November 15, 2009	Mayhill	Mayhill	·	3.9 km	MPC · JPL
379295	2009 VR_{61}	—	October 23, 2009	Kitt Peak	Spacewatch	·	1.3 km	MPC · JPL
379296	2009 VJ_{64}	—	November 8, 2009	Kitt Peak	Spacewatch	·	1.7 km	MPC · JPL
379297	2009 VJ_{68}	—	July 1, 2008	Catalina	CSS	·	2.9 km	MPC · JPL
379298	2009 VO_{70}	—	April 21, 2007	Cerro Tololo	Deep Ecliptic Survey	·	1.4 km	MPC · JPL
379299	2009 VF_{71}	—	November 9, 2009	Mount Lemmon	Mount Lemmon Survey	·	1.9 km	MPC · JPL
379300	2009 VL_{71}	—	November 9, 2009	Nogales	Tenagra II	·	1.6 km	MPC · JPL

== 379301–379400 ==
back to top

Designation			Discovery			Properties		Ref
Permanent	Provisional	Named after	Date	Site	Discoverer(s)	Category	Diam.	Ref
379301	2009 VH_{72}	—	November 14, 2009	Socorro	LINEAR	·	1.2 km	MPC · JPL
379302	2009 VB_{76}	—	November 13, 2009	La Sagra	OAM	·	2.2 km	MPC · JPL
379303	2009 VQ_{78}	—	November 9, 2009	Catalina	CSS	MAR	1.5 km	MPC · JPL
379304	2009 VN_{81}	—	November 9, 2009	Mount Lemmon	Mount Lemmon Survey	·	1.3 km	MPC · JPL
379305	2009 VH_{83}	—	October 30, 2009	Mount Lemmon	Mount Lemmon Survey	·	1.1 km	MPC · JPL
379306	2009 VR_{84}	—	November 9, 2009	Kitt Peak	Spacewatch	·	1.5 km	MPC · JPL
379307	2009 VB_{88}	—	November 10, 2009	Kitt Peak	Spacewatch	·	1.0 km	MPC · JPL
379308	2009 VQ_{90}	—	March 26, 2007	Kitt Peak	Spacewatch	·	1.9 km	MPC · JPL
379309	2009 VA_{91}	—	November 11, 2009	Kitt Peak	Spacewatch	·	1.1 km	MPC · JPL
379310	2009 VH_{91}	—	November 10, 2009	Kitt Peak	Spacewatch	EUN	1.8 km	MPC · JPL
379311	2009 VN_{103}	—	December 19, 2004	Mount Lemmon	Mount Lemmon Survey	·	2.2 km	MPC · JPL
379312	2009 WY_{4}	—	November 16, 2009	Kitt Peak	Spacewatch	·	1.9 km	MPC · JPL
379313	2009 WF_{10}	—	November 19, 2009	Socorro	LINEAR	·	1.4 km	MPC · JPL
379314	2009 WN_{14}	—	November 16, 2009	Mount Lemmon	Mount Lemmon Survey	·	1.1 km	MPC · JPL
379315	2009 WA_{19}	—	October 22, 2009	Mount Lemmon	Mount Lemmon Survey	·	1.2 km	MPC · JPL
379316	2009 WL_{19}	—	January 28, 2006	Catalina	CSS	·	3.3 km	MPC · JPL
379317	2009 WM_{25}	—	November 22, 2009	Catalina	CSS	·	1.4 km	MPC · JPL
379318	2009 WZ_{27}	—	November 25, 2005	Mount Lemmon	Mount Lemmon Survey	·	1.0 km	MPC · JPL
379319	2009 WA_{28}	—	March 13, 2007	Mount Lemmon	Mount Lemmon Survey	·	1.7 km	MPC · JPL
379320	2009 WS_{32}	—	November 16, 2009	Kitt Peak	Spacewatch	·	1.7 km	MPC · JPL
379321	2009 WT_{34}	—	November 16, 2009	Kitt Peak	Spacewatch	·	2.1 km	MPC · JPL
379322	2009 WC_{36}	—	November 17, 2009	Kitt Peak	Spacewatch	·	1.3 km	MPC · JPL
379323	2009 WW_{39}	—	December 17, 2001	Socorro	LINEAR	·	1.6 km	MPC · JPL
379324	2009 WZ_{41}	—	November 17, 2009	Kitt Peak	Spacewatch	EUN	1.3 km	MPC · JPL
379325	2009 WM_{42}	—	November 17, 2009	Mount Lemmon	Mount Lemmon Survey	·	2.4 km	MPC · JPL
379326	2009 WF_{52}	—	November 17, 2009	Catalina	CSS	·	2.1 km	MPC · JPL
379327	2009 WJ_{67}	—	November 17, 2009	Mount Lemmon	Mount Lemmon Survey	DOR	3.2 km	MPC · JPL
379328	2009 WA_{69}	—	November 17, 2009	Kitt Peak	Spacewatch	·	1.9 km	MPC · JPL
379329	2009 WY_{70}	—	November 18, 2009	Kitt Peak	Spacewatch	·	900 m	MPC · JPL
379330	2009 WP_{71}	—	October 21, 2009	Mount Lemmon	Mount Lemmon Survey	·	2.7 km	MPC · JPL
379331	2009 WG_{73}	—	November 18, 2009	Kitt Peak	Spacewatch	·	1.3 km	MPC · JPL
379332	2009 WG_{74}	—	November 18, 2009	Kitt Peak	Spacewatch	NYS	1.4 km	MPC · JPL
379333	2009 WU_{75}	—	November 18, 2009	Kitt Peak	Spacewatch	·	1.3 km	MPC · JPL
379334	2009 WX_{75}	—	November 18, 2009	Kitt Peak	Spacewatch	·	1.2 km	MPC · JPL
379335	2009 WT_{77}	—	December 25, 2005	Kitt Peak	Spacewatch	·	1.5 km	MPC · JPL
379336	2009 WY_{77}	—	November 18, 2009	Kitt Peak	Spacewatch	·	1.7 km	MPC · JPL
379337	2009 WK_{83}	—	November 19, 2009	Kitt Peak	Spacewatch	·	1.7 km	MPC · JPL
379338	2009 WZ_{83}	—	September 19, 2009	Mount Lemmon	Mount Lemmon Survey	·	1.3 km	MPC · JPL
379339	2009 WS_{85}	—	November 19, 2009	Kitt Peak	Spacewatch	·	2.7 km	MPC · JPL
379340	2009 WY_{87}	—	November 19, 2009	Kitt Peak	Spacewatch	(5)	1.4 km	MPC · JPL
379341	2009 WT_{89}	—	November 19, 2009	Kitt Peak	Spacewatch	·	4.0 km	MPC · JPL
379342	2009 WN_{92}	—	November 19, 2009	Mount Lemmon	Mount Lemmon Survey	·	1.7 km	MPC · JPL
379343	2009 WO_{92}	—	November 19, 2009	Kitt Peak	Spacewatch	·	1.4 km	MPC · JPL
379344	2009 WA_{93}	—	November 19, 2009	Kitt Peak	Spacewatch	·	2.3 km	MPC · JPL
379345	2009 WC_{101}	—	November 22, 2009	Kitt Peak	Spacewatch	·	1.4 km	MPC · JPL
379346	2009 WS_{101}	—	November 22, 2009	Catalina	CSS	·	2.1 km	MPC · JPL
379347	2009 WQ_{105}	—	November 25, 2009	La Sagra	OAM	(5)	2.1 km	MPC · JPL
379348	2009 WF_{116}	—	December 1, 2005	Mount Lemmon	Mount Lemmon Survey	·	1.9 km	MPC · JPL
379349	2009 WL_{125}	—	November 16, 2009	Kitt Peak	Spacewatch	·	1.7 km	MPC · JPL
379350	2009 WG_{132}	—	November 20, 2009	Andrushivka	Andrushivka	·	2.1 km	MPC · JPL
379351	2009 WN_{132}	—	November 21, 2009	Catalina	CSS	·	1.8 km	MPC · JPL
379352	2009 WT_{136}	—	November 23, 2009	Catalina	CSS	·	1.2 km	MPC · JPL
379353	2009 WP_{150}	—	March 26, 2007	Mount Lemmon	Mount Lemmon Survey	KON	2.5 km	MPC · JPL
379354	2009 WB_{159}	—	November 20, 2009	Mount Lemmon	Mount Lemmon Survey	·	1.6 km	MPC · JPL
379355	2009 WJ_{159}	—	November 20, 2009	Andrushivka	Andrushivka	·	1.3 km	MPC · JPL
379356	2009 WO_{165}	—	November 21, 2009	Kitt Peak	Spacewatch	·	1.5 km	MPC · JPL
379357	2009 WY_{171}	—	November 22, 2009	Mount Lemmon	Mount Lemmon Survey	·	1.9 km	MPC · JPL
379358	2009 WG_{175}	—	November 23, 2009	Kitt Peak	Spacewatch	·	1.8 km	MPC · JPL
379359	2009 WX_{176}	—	November 23, 2009	Catalina	CSS	·	2.4 km	MPC · JPL
379360	2009 WJ_{180}	—	November 23, 2009	Kitt Peak	Spacewatch	·	1.5 km	MPC · JPL
379361	2009 WV_{180}	—	November 23, 2009	Kitt Peak	Spacewatch	·	1.7 km	MPC · JPL
379362	2009 WE_{188}	—	October 28, 2005	Kitt Peak	Spacewatch	·	1.9 km	MPC · JPL
379363	2009 WH_{192}	—	November 24, 2009	Mount Lemmon	Mount Lemmon Survey	·	1.2 km	MPC · JPL
379364	2009 WO_{209}	—	November 17, 2009	Kitt Peak	Spacewatch	·	1.3 km	MPC · JPL
379365	2009 WC_{211}	—	November 18, 2009	Kitt Peak	Spacewatch	·	1.2 km	MPC · JPL
379366	2009 WE_{212}	—	November 18, 2009	Kitt Peak	Spacewatch	·	1.9 km	MPC · JPL
379367	2009 WT_{212}	—	November 18, 2009	Kitt Peak	Spacewatch	·	1.5 km	MPC · JPL
379368	2009 WU_{214}	—	November 21, 2009	Kitt Peak	Spacewatch	·	1.3 km	MPC · JPL
379369	2009 WN_{216}	—	October 24, 2009	Catalina	CSS	KON	3.9 km	MPC · JPL
379370	2009 WX_{242}	—	November 19, 2009	Kitt Peak	Spacewatch	·	1.6 km	MPC · JPL
379371	2009 WA_{248}	—	November 16, 2009	Mount Lemmon	Mount Lemmon Survey	·	940 m	MPC · JPL
379372	2009 WA_{250}	—	November 25, 2009	Kitt Peak	Spacewatch	·	2.0 km	MPC · JPL
379373	2009 WS_{253}	—	November 17, 2009	Kitt Peak	Spacewatch	·	1.2 km	MPC · JPL
379374	2009 WV_{255}	—	November 20, 2009	Kitt Peak	Spacewatch	·	1.9 km	MPC · JPL
379375	2009 WW_{259}	—	November 16, 2009	Kitt Peak	Spacewatch	·	2.5 km	MPC · JPL
379376	2009 WR_{261}	—	November 16, 2009	Socorro	LINEAR	·	2.9 km	MPC · JPL
379377	2009 WZ_{261}	—	November 20, 2009	Mount Lemmon	Mount Lemmon Survey	EUN	1.6 km	MPC · JPL
379378	2009 WT_{262}	—	November 21, 2009	Mount Lemmon	Mount Lemmon Survey	·	1.5 km	MPC · JPL
379379	2009 XT_{3}	—	December 9, 2009	La Sagra	OAM	·	2.3 km	MPC · JPL
379380	2009 XF_{4}	—	December 10, 2009	Mount Lemmon	Mount Lemmon Survey	·	2.0 km	MPC · JPL
379381	2009 XN_{10}	—	December 10, 2009	Mount Lemmon	Mount Lemmon Survey	·	2.5 km	MPC · JPL
379382	2009 XP_{12}	—	November 8, 2009	Kitt Peak	Spacewatch	(5)	1.2 km	MPC · JPL
379383	2009 XX_{13}	—	November 10, 2009	Kitt Peak	Spacewatch	NEM	2.1 km	MPC · JPL
379384	2009 XC_{15}	—	December 15, 2009	Mount Lemmon	Mount Lemmon Survey	WIT	930 m	MPC · JPL
379385	2009 XB_{17}	—	December 15, 2009	Mount Lemmon	Mount Lemmon Survey	·	2.5 km	MPC · JPL
379386	2009 XV_{19}	—	December 15, 2009	Mount Lemmon	Mount Lemmon Survey	·	1.7 km	MPC · JPL
379387	2009 YM_{5}	—	December 17, 2009	Mount Lemmon	Mount Lemmon Survey	·	2.3 km	MPC · JPL
379388	2009 YR_{5}	—	December 17, 2009	Mount Lemmon	Mount Lemmon Survey	·	1.6 km	MPC · JPL
379389	2009 YD_{6}	—	December 17, 2009	Kitt Peak	Spacewatch	AEO	1.9 km	MPC · JPL
379390	2009 YE_{6}	—	December 17, 2009	Kitt Peak	Spacewatch	·	1.3 km	MPC · JPL
379391	2009 YR_{9}	—	December 17, 2009	Mount Lemmon	Mount Lemmon Survey	·	1.9 km	MPC · JPL
379392	2009 YB_{10}	—	December 17, 2009	Mount Lemmon	Mount Lemmon Survey	HOF	3.4 km	MPC · JPL
379393	2009 YR_{10}	—	December 18, 2009	Mount Lemmon	Mount Lemmon Survey	DOR	2.5 km	MPC · JPL
379394	2009 YV_{12}	—	December 18, 2009	Kitt Peak	Spacewatch	·	3.3 km	MPC · JPL
379395	2009 YZ_{13}	—	September 4, 2008	Kitt Peak	Spacewatch	AGN	1.0 km	MPC · JPL
379396	2009 YM_{20}	—	December 27, 2009	Kitt Peak	Spacewatch	·	2.3 km	MPC · JPL
379397	2009 YY_{20}	—	December 27, 2009	Kitt Peak	Spacewatch	·	2.3 km	MPC · JPL
379398	2010 AU_{2}	—	January 7, 2010	Bisei SG Center	BATTeRS	·	2.3 km	MPC · JPL
379399	2010 AZ_{3}	—	January 9, 2010	Janesville	Doc Greiner Research Observatory	·	2.8 km	MPC · JPL
379400	2010 AG_{8}	—	January 6, 2010	Catalina	CSS	·	2.4 km	MPC · JPL

== 379401–379500 ==
back to top

Designation			Discovery			Properties		Ref
Permanent	Provisional	Named after	Date	Site	Discoverer(s)	Category	Diam.	Ref
379401	2010 AH_{8}	—	January 6, 2010	Catalina	CSS	·	2.4 km	MPC · JPL
379402	2010 AL_{8}	—	January 6, 2010	Catalina	CSS	NAE	3.2 km	MPC · JPL
379403	2010 AA_{10}	—	January 6, 2010	Catalina	CSS	·	2.2 km	MPC · JPL
379404	2010 AH_{23}	—	January 6, 2010	Kitt Peak	Spacewatch	EOS	2.5 km	MPC · JPL
379405	2010 AU_{32}	—	November 17, 2009	Mount Lemmon	Mount Lemmon Survey	·	2.7 km	MPC · JPL
379406	2010 AY_{40}	—	January 5, 2010	Kitt Peak	Spacewatch	·	2.4 km	MPC · JPL
379407	2010 AX_{41}	—	January 6, 2010	Catalina	CSS	·	1.8 km	MPC · JPL
379408	2010 AA_{42}	—	January 6, 2010	Catalina	CSS	·	1.4 km	MPC · JPL
379409	2010 AD_{43}	—	December 19, 2009	Kitt Peak	Spacewatch	·	2.1 km	MPC · JPL
379410	2010 AP_{50}	—	January 8, 2010	Kitt Peak	Spacewatch	·	3.5 km	MPC · JPL
379411	2010 AW_{56}	—	December 27, 2009	Kitt Peak	Spacewatch	·	1.7 km	MPC · JPL
379412	2010 AO_{59}	—	January 6, 2010	Catalina	CSS	·	1.8 km	MPC · JPL
379413	2010 AA_{61}	—	January 10, 2010	Socorro	LINEAR	·	3.4 km	MPC · JPL
379414	2010 AU_{67}	—	January 12, 2010	Kitt Peak	Spacewatch	·	3.6 km	MPC · JPL
379415	2010 AB_{71}	—	January 12, 2010	Mount Lemmon	Mount Lemmon Survey	·	1.4 km	MPC · JPL
379416	2010 AV_{73}	—	November 27, 2009	Kitt Peak	Spacewatch	·	2.6 km	MPC · JPL
379417	2010 AY_{73}	—	January 15, 2010	Catalina	CSS	·	4.4 km	MPC · JPL
379418	2010 AE_{74}	—	January 7, 2010	Kitt Peak	Spacewatch	·	3.2 km	MPC · JPL
379419	2010 AD_{75}	—	December 30, 2000	Socorro	LINEAR	·	2.3 km	MPC · JPL
379420	2010 AP_{75}	—	January 10, 2010	Socorro	LINEAR	ADE	3.4 km	MPC · JPL
379421	2010 AF_{77}	—	November 16, 2009	Mount Lemmon	Mount Lemmon Survey	·	2.8 km	MPC · JPL
379422	2010 AW_{77}	—	January 6, 2010	Catalina	CSS	·	2.9 km	MPC · JPL
379423	2010 AB_{122}	—	January 14, 2010	WISE	WISE	·	3.1 km	MPC · JPL
379424	2010 BW	—	January 17, 2010	Bisei SG Center	BATTeRS	HOF	2.6 km	MPC · JPL
379425	2010 BK_{6}	—	January 17, 2010	Siding Spring	SSS	EUP	6.0 km	MPC · JPL
379426	2010 BF_{10}	—	January 16, 2010	WISE	WISE	CYB	6.5 km	MPC · JPL
379427	2010 BV_{93}	—	January 27, 2010	WISE	WISE	T_{j} (2.97)	4.8 km	MPC · JPL
379428	2010 CL_{5}	—	February 9, 2010	Catalina	CSS	AGN	1.5 km	MPC · JPL
379429	2010 CK_{11}	—	December 6, 2008	Mount Lemmon	Mount Lemmon Survey	·	3.5 km	MPC · JPL
379430	2010 CF_{18}	—	February 12, 2010	Pla D'Arguines	R. Ferrando	·	3.3 km	MPC · JPL
379431	2010 CU_{25}	—	February 9, 2010	Mount Lemmon	Mount Lemmon Survey	·	3.6 km	MPC · JPL
379432	2010 CB_{26}	—	April 2, 2006	Kitt Peak	Spacewatch	KOR	1.3 km	MPC · JPL
379433	2010 CS_{34}	—	October 26, 2008	Mount Lemmon	Mount Lemmon Survey	·	3.6 km	MPC · JPL
379434	2010 CH_{35}	—	February 10, 2010	Kitt Peak	Spacewatch	·	4.4 km	MPC · JPL
379435	2010 CX_{41}	—	February 6, 2010	Mount Lemmon	Mount Lemmon Survey	·	5.6 km	MPC · JPL
379436	2010 CK_{43}	—	January 16, 2010	Catalina	CSS	·	2.9 km	MPC · JPL
379437	2010 CD_{53}	—	February 14, 2010	WISE	WISE	·	2.6 km	MPC · JPL
379438	2010 CE_{57}	—	April 12, 2005	Kitt Peak	Spacewatch	THM	3.8 km	MPC · JPL
379439	2010 CH_{61}	—	February 9, 2010	Catalina	CSS	·	1.5 km	MPC · JPL
379440	2010 CW_{67}	—	February 2, 2000	Kitt Peak	Spacewatch	·	2.2 km	MPC · JPL
379441	2010 CV_{70}	—	January 6, 2010	Kitt Peak	Spacewatch	·	4.2 km	MPC · JPL
379442	2010 CD_{80}	—	February 13, 2010	Mount Lemmon	Mount Lemmon Survey	·	3.2 km	MPC · JPL
379443	2010 CV_{80}	—	February 13, 2010	Mount Lemmon	Mount Lemmon Survey	CYB	5.2 km	MPC · JPL
379444	2010 CE_{81}	—	February 13, 2010	Mount Lemmon	Mount Lemmon Survey	·	4.3 km	MPC · JPL
379445	2010 CX_{81}	—	February 13, 2010	Kitt Peak	Spacewatch	THM	2.3 km	MPC · JPL
379446	2010 CK_{85}	—	February 14, 2010	Kitt Peak	Spacewatch	·	2.2 km	MPC · JPL
379447	2010 CZ_{92}	—	February 14, 2010	Kitt Peak	Spacewatch	THM	2.8 km	MPC · JPL
379448	2010 CM_{95}	—	March 9, 2005	Mount Lemmon	Mount Lemmon Survey	·	2.2 km	MPC · JPL
379449	2010 CN_{98}	—	February 14, 2010	Mount Lemmon	Mount Lemmon Survey	·	1.8 km	MPC · JPL
379450	2010 CY_{98}	—	September 12, 2007	Mount Lemmon	Mount Lemmon Survey	·	2.3 km	MPC · JPL
379451	2010 CV_{100}	—	February 14, 2010	Mount Lemmon	Mount Lemmon Survey	·	1.8 km	MPC · JPL
379452	2010 CD_{114}	—	February 14, 2010	Mount Lemmon	Mount Lemmon Survey	THM	2.9 km	MPC · JPL
379453	2010 CH_{117}	—	February 14, 2010	Mount Lemmon	Mount Lemmon Survey	·	3.4 km	MPC · JPL
379454	2010 CG_{118}	—	February 15, 2010	Kitt Peak	Spacewatch	HOF	2.6 km	MPC · JPL
379455	2010 CP_{141}	—	March 1, 2005	Kitt Peak	Spacewatch	·	2.0 km	MPC · JPL
379456	2010 CW_{144}	—	February 13, 2010	Catalina	CSS	·	4.3 km	MPC · JPL
379457	2010 CD_{155}	—	February 15, 2010	Kitt Peak	Spacewatch	·	4.0 km	MPC · JPL
379458	2010 CG_{156}	—	February 15, 2010	Kitt Peak	Spacewatch	·	5.6 km	MPC · JPL
379459	2010 CH_{157}	—	February 15, 2010	Kitt Peak	Spacewatch	EOS	1.7 km	MPC · JPL
379460	2010 CS_{159}	—	February 15, 2010	Kitt Peak	Spacewatch	·	2.5 km	MPC · JPL
379461	2010 CP_{161}	—	February 6, 2010	Mount Lemmon	Mount Lemmon Survey	·	2.6 km	MPC · JPL
379462	2010 CG_{165}	—	February 10, 2010	Kitt Peak	Spacewatch	·	3.0 km	MPC · JPL
379463	2010 CK_{172}	—	February 15, 2010	Kitt Peak	Spacewatch	·	3.2 km	MPC · JPL
379464	2010 CA_{177}	—	February 10, 2010	Kitt Peak	Spacewatch	·	3.2 km	MPC · JPL
379465	2010 CE_{177}	—	February 10, 2010	Kitt Peak	Spacewatch	·	4.3 km	MPC · JPL
379466	2010 CJ_{183}	—	February 15, 2010	Haleakala	Pan-STARRS 1	·	3.1 km	MPC · JPL
379467	2010 CV_{183}	—	February 15, 2010	Haleakala	Pan-STARRS 1	·	4.7 km	MPC · JPL
379468	2010 CC_{185}	—	February 15, 2010	Mount Lemmon	Mount Lemmon Survey	VER	2.7 km	MPC · JPL
379469	2010 CM_{185}	—	February 5, 2010	Kitt Peak	Spacewatch	·	4.0 km	MPC · JPL
379470 Carolynjones	2010 DQ_{4}	Carolynjones	February 16, 2010	Mount Lemmon	Mount Lemmon Survey	·	2.0 km	MPC · JPL
379471	2010 DG_{34}	—	February 20, 2010	WISE	WISE	EUP	4.1 km	MPC · JPL
379472	2010 DT_{40}	—	February 16, 2010	Haleakala	M. Micheli	·	2.2 km	MPC · JPL
379473	2010 DC_{42}	—	February 17, 2010	Mount Lemmon	Mount Lemmon Survey	·	1.8 km	MPC · JPL
379474	2010 DA_{47}	—	February 13, 2010	Kitt Peak	Spacewatch	·	3.2 km	MPC · JPL
379475	2010 DB_{47}	—	February 17, 2010	Kitt Peak	Spacewatch	·	3.4 km	MPC · JPL
379476	2010 DU_{76}	—	February 17, 2010	Catalina	CSS	·	3.7 km	MPC · JPL
379477	2010 DE_{79}	—	February 18, 2010	Catalina	CSS	·	2.9 km	MPC · JPL
379478	2010 DE_{86}	—	February 11, 2002	Socorro	LINEAR	·	2.8 km	MPC · JPL
379479	2010 EH_{10}	—	March 4, 2010	WISE	WISE	·	2.3 km	MPC · JPL
379480	2010 EQ_{35}	—	March 6, 1999	Kitt Peak	Spacewatch	·	2.8 km	MPC · JPL
379481	2010 ET_{45}	—	March 15, 2010	Dauban	Kugel, F.	·	3.3 km	MPC · JPL
379482	2010 EZ_{77}	—	March 12, 2010	Mount Lemmon	Mount Lemmon Survey	·	3.9 km	MPC · JPL
379483	2010 EP_{91}	—	September 20, 1996	Kitt Peak	Spacewatch	·	3.1 km	MPC · JPL
379484	2010 EB_{98}	—	March 14, 2010	Mount Lemmon	Mount Lemmon Survey	VER	3.4 km	MPC · JPL
379485	2010 EL_{98}	—	March 14, 2010	Kitt Peak	Spacewatch	·	2.8 km	MPC · JPL
379486	2010 EB_{106}	—	March 13, 2010	Catalina	CSS	·	3.0 km	MPC · JPL
379487	2010 ED_{107}	—	March 12, 2010	Catalina	CSS	·	4.2 km	MPC · JPL
379488	2010 EK_{107}	—	March 12, 2010	Kitt Peak	Spacewatch	THM	2.8 km	MPC · JPL
379489	2010 EZ_{107}	—	March 12, 2010	Mount Lemmon	Mount Lemmon Survey	·	3.7 km	MPC · JPL
379490	2010 EB_{112}	—	March 12, 2010	Mount Lemmon	Mount Lemmon Survey	·	2.7 km	MPC · JPL
379491	2010 EQ_{127}	—	March 12, 2010	Catalina	CSS	·	3.4 km	MPC · JPL
379492	2010 EH_{139}	—	March 12, 2010	Mount Lemmon	Mount Lemmon Survey	·	3.1 km	MPC · JPL
379493	2010 ER_{139}	—	March 13, 2010	Mount Lemmon	Mount Lemmon Survey	THM	2.2 km	MPC · JPL
379494	2010 EK_{141}	—	December 22, 2003	Kitt Peak	Spacewatch	·	2.4 km	MPC · JPL
379495	2010 EN_{143}	—	March 9, 2010	Siding Spring	SSS	·	3.0 km	MPC · JPL
379496	2010 ER_{143}	—	March 15, 2010	Catalina	CSS	·	2.9 km	MPC · JPL
379497	2010 FN_{21}	—	March 18, 2010	Mount Lemmon	Mount Lemmon Survey	SYL · CYB	4.8 km	MPC · JPL
379498	2010 FZ_{30}	—	March 17, 2010	Kitt Peak	Spacewatch	·	4.3 km	MPC · JPL
379499	2010 FE_{53}	—	December 20, 2009	Catalina	CSS	·	2.1 km	MPC · JPL
379500	2010 FU_{56}	—	March 20, 2010	Catalina	CSS	EMA	5.1 km	MPC · JPL

== 379501–379600 ==
back to top

Designation			Discovery			Properties		Ref
Permanent	Provisional	Named after	Date	Site	Discoverer(s)	Category	Diam.	Ref
379501	2010 FR_{87}	—	March 26, 2010	Kitt Peak	Spacewatch	·	4.4 km	MPC · JPL
379502	2010 FW_{91}	—	September 13, 2007	Mount Lemmon	Mount Lemmon Survey	·	2.5 km	MPC · JPL
379503	2010 FM_{101}	—	March 21, 2010	Catalina	CSS	·	4.4 km	MPC · JPL
379504	2010 GB_{74}	—	April 14, 2010	WISE	WISE	·	3.3 km	MPC · JPL
379505	2010 GX_{99}	—	October 18, 2007	Mount Lemmon	Mount Lemmon Survey	·	3.5 km	MPC · JPL
379506	2010 GN_{105}	—	April 7, 2010	Kitt Peak	Spacewatch	AEG	3.0 km	MPC · JPL
379507	2010 GL_{135}	—	April 4, 2010	Kitt Peak	Spacewatch	·	2.4 km	MPC · JPL
379508	2010 GU_{157}	—	April 11, 2010	Mount Lemmon	Mount Lemmon Survey	·	3.7 km	MPC · JPL
379509	2010 GC_{159}	—	April 5, 2010	Catalina	CSS	·	5.9 km	MPC · JPL
379510	2010 GC_{161}	—	April 14, 2010	Mount Lemmon	Mount Lemmon Survey	·	4.1 km	MPC · JPL
379511	2010 HC_{1}	—	April 18, 2010	WISE	WISE	L5	10 km	MPC · JPL
379512	2010 HJ_{63}	—	April 26, 2010	WISE	WISE	·	4.4 km	MPC · JPL
379513	2010 JG_{35}	—	May 4, 2010	Catalina	CSS	·	4.2 km	MPC · JPL
379514	2010 JW_{78}	—	May 11, 2010	Kitt Peak	Spacewatch	H	470 m	MPC · JPL
379515	2010 JD_{113}	—	May 7, 2010	Mount Lemmon	Mount Lemmon Survey	·	4.7 km	MPC · JPL
379516	2010 LM_{6}	—	June 1, 2010	WISE	WISE	·	3.9 km	MPC · JPL
379517	2010 LH_{33}	—	February 2, 2009	Mount Lemmon	Mount Lemmon Survey	·	3.1 km	MPC · JPL
379518	2010 LB_{49}	—	June 8, 2010	WISE	WISE	·	5.0 km	MPC · JPL
379519	2010 LS_{68}	—	June 9, 2010	WISE	WISE	·	2.0 km	MPC · JPL
379520	2010 OS_{23}	—	May 17, 2001	Socorro	LINEAR	·	2.3 km	MPC · JPL
379521	2010 OR_{86}	—	July 27, 2010	WISE	WISE	·	5.0 km	MPC · JPL
379522	2010 UV_{4}	—	October 17, 2010	Mount Lemmon	Mount Lemmon Survey	·	1.5 km	MPC · JPL
379523	2010 UY_{66}	—	December 4, 2007	Mount Lemmon	Mount Lemmon Survey	·	900 m	MPC · JPL
379524	2010 UP_{76}	—	August 10, 2010	Kitt Peak	Spacewatch	·	830 m	MPC · JPL
379525	2010 UC_{93}	—	December 5, 2007	Kitt Peak	Spacewatch	·	780 m	MPC · JPL
379526	2010 UH_{104}	—	March 28, 2009	Mount Lemmon	Mount Lemmon Survey	·	630 m	MPC · JPL
379527	2010 US_{106}	—	November 23, 2006	Mount Lemmon	Mount Lemmon Survey	·	2.3 km	MPC · JPL
379528	2010 VW_{23}	—	November 9, 2007	Kitt Peak	Spacewatch	·	1.1 km	MPC · JPL
379529	2010 VM_{71}	—	December 30, 2007	Mount Lemmon	Mount Lemmon Survey	·	840 m	MPC · JPL
379530	2010 VL_{112}	—	September 18, 2010	Mount Lemmon	Mount Lemmon Survey	·	820 m	MPC · JPL
379531	2010 WP_{10}	—	September 26, 2009	Kitt Peak	Spacewatch	L4	7.0 km	MPC · JPL
379532	2010 WW_{45}	—	February 4, 2005	Kitt Peak	Spacewatch	·	730 m	MPC · JPL
379533	2010 WV_{55}	—	May 24, 2006	Mount Lemmon	Mount Lemmon Survey	·	800 m	MPC · JPL
379534	2010 WO_{58}	—	December 4, 2007	Kitt Peak	Spacewatch	·	700 m	MPC · JPL
379535	2010 WS_{60}	—	April 11, 2005	Mount Lemmon	Mount Lemmon Survey	·	800 m	MPC · JPL
379536	2010 WP_{63}	—	January 15, 2008	Mount Lemmon	Mount Lemmon Survey	·	670 m	MPC · JPL
379537	2010 WT_{72}	—	November 27, 2010	Mount Lemmon	Mount Lemmon Survey	·	880 m	MPC · JPL
379538	2010 XP_{15}	—	March 11, 2002	Kitt Peak	Spacewatch	·	720 m	MPC · JPL
379539	2010 XA_{48}	—	October 20, 2007	Mount Lemmon	Mount Lemmon Survey	·	750 m	MPC · JPL
379540	2010 XW_{62}	—	December 19, 2007	Mount Lemmon	Mount Lemmon Survey	·	770 m	MPC · JPL
379541	2011 AN	—	December 29, 2003	Kitt Peak	Spacewatch	·	580 m	MPC · JPL
379542	2011 AQ_{3}	—	February 12, 2008	Mount Lemmon	Mount Lemmon Survey	·	1.1 km	MPC · JPL
379543	2011 AZ_{7}	—	October 31, 2006	Mount Lemmon	Mount Lemmon Survey	NYS	970 m	MPC · JPL
379544	2011 AQ_{14}	—	November 15, 2010	Mount Lemmon	Mount Lemmon Survey	·	880 m	MPC · JPL
379545	2011 AC_{15}	—	September 21, 2009	Mount Lemmon	Mount Lemmon Survey	·	2.2 km	MPC · JPL
379546	2011 AJ_{15}	—	December 9, 2010	Kitt Peak	Spacewatch	·	3.8 km	MPC · JPL
379547	2011 AR_{19}	—	December 9, 2006	Kitt Peak	Spacewatch	·	1.5 km	MPC · JPL
379548	2011 AN_{21}	—	December 21, 2006	Kitt Peak	Spacewatch	·	1.2 km	MPC · JPL
379549	2011 AT_{21}	—	March 10, 2008	Mount Lemmon	Mount Lemmon Survey	·	760 m	MPC · JPL
379550	2011 AE_{24}	—	August 28, 2009	Kitt Peak	Spacewatch	·	1.2 km	MPC · JPL
379551	2011 AN_{24}	—	March 6, 2008	Mount Lemmon	Mount Lemmon Survey	(2076)	1.2 km	MPC · JPL
379552	2011 AT_{32}	—	September 18, 2006	Kitt Peak	Spacewatch	·	660 m	MPC · JPL
379553	2011 AU_{34}	—	September 20, 2006	Kitt Peak	Spacewatch	·	660 m	MPC · JPL
379554	2011 AR_{41}	—	January 10, 2011	Mount Lemmon	Mount Lemmon Survey	·	1.9 km	MPC · JPL
379555	2011 AU_{44}	—	September 19, 2006	Kitt Peak	Spacewatch	·	640 m	MPC · JPL
379556	2011 AA_{47}	—	January 21, 2004	Socorro	LINEAR	·	900 m	MPC · JPL
379557	2011 AR_{53}	—	August 19, 2006	Kitt Peak	Spacewatch	·	720 m	MPC · JPL
379558	2011 AL_{56}	—	February 6, 2007	Mount Lemmon	Mount Lemmon Survey	KON	3.0 km	MPC · JPL
379559	2011 AF_{57}	—	December 12, 2006	Kitt Peak	Spacewatch	·	1.1 km	MPC · JPL
379560	2011 AL_{66}	—	February 17, 2004	Kitt Peak	Spacewatch	·	1.2 km	MPC · JPL
379561	2011 AR_{66}	—	November 20, 2006	Kitt Peak	Spacewatch	·	770 m	MPC · JPL
379562	2011 AK_{69}	—	January 3, 2011	Mount Lemmon	Mount Lemmon Survey	·	1.2 km	MPC · JPL
379563	2011 AJ_{72}	—	September 21, 2009	Mount Lemmon	Mount Lemmon Survey	·	1.2 km	MPC · JPL
379564	2011 AE_{78}	—	November 19, 2006	Catalina	CSS	PHO	1.1 km	MPC · JPL
379565	2011 AS_{79}	—	January 22, 2004	Socorro	LINEAR	·	640 m	MPC · JPL
379566	2011 BA_{2}	—	February 11, 2004	Kitt Peak	Spacewatch	NYS	1.0 km	MPC · JPL
379567	2011 BC_{3}	—	February 28, 2008	Kitt Peak	Spacewatch	·	600 m	MPC · JPL
379568	2011 BL_{4}	—	December 5, 2010	Mount Lemmon	Mount Lemmon Survey	·	1.7 km	MPC · JPL
379569	2011 BK_{8}	—	February 14, 2004	Kitt Peak	Spacewatch	·	770 m	MPC · JPL
379570	2011 BY_{14}	—	September 28, 2006	Kitt Peak	Spacewatch	·	730 m	MPC · JPL
379571	2011 BH_{25}	—	May 16, 2004	Kitt Peak	Spacewatch	·	1.3 km	MPC · JPL
379572	2011 BD_{32}	—	September 19, 2006	Catalina	CSS	·	770 m	MPC · JPL
379573	2011 BB_{33}	—	October 23, 2006	Mount Lemmon	Mount Lemmon Survey	·	1.4 km	MPC · JPL
379574	2011 BW_{37}	—	September 13, 2004	Kitt Peak	Spacewatch	EUN	1.8 km	MPC · JPL
379575	2011 BD_{43}	—	November 26, 2005	Mount Lemmon	Mount Lemmon Survey	·	1.7 km	MPC · JPL
379576	2011 BP_{45}	—	February 16, 2004	Kitt Peak	Spacewatch	·	760 m	MPC · JPL
379577	2011 BV_{50}	—	September 21, 2009	Mount Lemmon	Mount Lemmon Survey	·	1.5 km	MPC · JPL
379578	2011 BS_{52}	—	November 16, 2006	Kitt Peak	Spacewatch	·	1.1 km	MPC · JPL
379579	2011 BM_{54}	—	December 1, 2006	Mount Lemmon	Mount Lemmon Survey	·	1.1 km	MPC · JPL
379580	2011 BD_{63}	—	April 28, 2003	Kitt Peak	Spacewatch	·	2.1 km	MPC · JPL
379581	2011 BC_{67}	—	September 26, 2006	Kitt Peak	Spacewatch	·	690 m	MPC · JPL
379582	2011 BM_{68}	—	January 19, 2004	Kitt Peak	Spacewatch	·	730 m	MPC · JPL
379583	2011 BY_{71}	—	November 20, 2009	Mount Lemmon	Mount Lemmon Survey	·	1.5 km	MPC · JPL
379584	2011 BO_{80}	—	November 16, 2006	Kitt Peak	Spacewatch	·	1.2 km	MPC · JPL
379585	2011 BF_{83}	—	March 31, 2003	Anderson Mesa	LONEOS	·	1.5 km	MPC · JPL
379586	2011 BG_{84}	—	August 18, 2006	Kitt Peak	Spacewatch	·	680 m	MPC · JPL
379587	2011 BE_{100}	—	September 18, 2009	Kitt Peak	Spacewatch	·	1.5 km	MPC · JPL
379588	2011 BO_{114}	—	October 4, 2006	Mount Lemmon	Mount Lemmon Survey	·	900 m	MPC · JPL
379589	2011 BT_{115}	—	December 5, 2010	Mount Lemmon	Mount Lemmon Survey	EUN	1.4 km	MPC · JPL
379590	2011 BE_{139}	—	July 15, 2005	Kitt Peak	Spacewatch	·	1.4 km	MPC · JPL
379591	2011 CZ_{1}	—	February 27, 2000	Kitt Peak	Spacewatch	NYS	1.4 km	MPC · JPL
379592	2011 CZ_{2}	—	October 28, 2006	Catalina	CSS	·	1.3 km	MPC · JPL
379593	2011 CX_{12}	—	November 5, 2005	Kitt Peak	Spacewatch	(5)	1.3 km	MPC · JPL
379594	2011 CS_{15}	—	October 23, 2006	Kitt Peak	Spacewatch	·	700 m	MPC · JPL
379595	2011 CY_{18}	—	November 30, 2005	Kitt Peak	Spacewatch	·	2.5 km	MPC · JPL
379596	2011 CF_{19}	—	October 2, 2006	Mount Lemmon	Mount Lemmon Survey	NYS	830 m	MPC · JPL
379597	2011 CS_{33}	—	December 8, 2010	Mount Lemmon	Mount Lemmon Survey	·	910 m	MPC · JPL
379598	2011 CW_{33}	—	January 27, 2011	Mount Lemmon	Mount Lemmon Survey	V	690 m	MPC · JPL
379599	2011 CY_{37}	—	November 20, 2006	Kitt Peak	Spacewatch	MAS	740 m	MPC · JPL
379600	2011 CB_{42}	—	April 29, 2000	Socorro	LINEAR	·	1.9 km	MPC · JPL

== 379601–379700 ==
back to top

Designation			Discovery			Properties		Ref
Permanent	Provisional	Named after	Date	Site	Discoverer(s)	Category	Diam.	Ref
379601	2011 CZ_{45}	—	August 15, 2009	Catalina	CSS	·	1.4 km	MPC · JPL
379602	2011 CZ_{46}	—	October 16, 2006	Catalina	CSS	·	920 m	MPC · JPL
379603	2011 CD_{49}	—	May 14, 2004	Kitt Peak	Spacewatch	·	1.2 km	MPC · JPL
379604	2011 CY_{52}	—	August 16, 2009	Kitt Peak	Spacewatch	·	1.2 km	MPC · JPL
379605	2011 CJ_{54}	—	January 28, 2007	Mount Lemmon	Mount Lemmon Survey	·	1.1 km	MPC · JPL
379606	2011 CO_{61}	—	September 17, 2009	Kitt Peak	Spacewatch	·	910 m	MPC · JPL
379607	2011 CY_{67}	—	January 10, 2007	Kitt Peak	Spacewatch	·	1.1 km	MPC · JPL
379608	2011 CS_{68}	—	January 8, 2007	Kitt Peak	Spacewatch	·	1.2 km	MPC · JPL
379609	2011 CS_{72}	—	March 15, 2004	Socorro	LINEAR	NYS	1.1 km	MPC · JPL
379610	2011 CY_{73}	—	January 24, 2006	Anderson Mesa	LONEOS	·	3.2 km	MPC · JPL
379611	2011 CZ_{74}	—	November 20, 2003	Socorro	LINEAR	·	880 m	MPC · JPL
379612	2011 CC_{75}	—	August 8, 2004	Socorro	LINEAR	·	2.0 km	MPC · JPL
379613	2011 CE_{83}	—	September 29, 2005	Catalina	CSS	·	1.4 km	MPC · JPL
379614	2011 CS_{86}	—	December 2, 2005	Mount Lemmon	Mount Lemmon Survey	·	1.5 km	MPC · JPL
379615	2011 CA_{88}	—	November 18, 2006	Kitt Peak	Spacewatch	NYS	1 km	MPC · JPL
379616	2011 CO_{88}	—	December 9, 2006	Kitt Peak	Spacewatch	·	1.0 km	MPC · JPL
379617	2011 CK_{112}	—	August 15, 2009	Catalina	CSS	·	1.2 km	MPC · JPL
379618	2011 CY_{115}	—	October 28, 2005	Kitt Peak	Spacewatch	·	1.2 km	MPC · JPL
379619	2011 DB_{3}	—	February 4, 2000	Kitt Peak	Spacewatch	NYS	900 m	MPC · JPL
379620	2011 DU_{3}	—	February 23, 2004	Socorro	LINEAR	·	700 m	MPC · JPL
379621	2011 DB_{6}	—	December 26, 2006	Catalina	CSS	·	1.6 km	MPC · JPL
379622	2011 DF_{6}	—	March 3, 2000	Kitt Peak	Spacewatch	·	1.3 km	MPC · JPL
379623	2011 DY_{7}	—	November 8, 2009	Mount Lemmon	Mount Lemmon Survey	(5)	1.2 km	MPC · JPL
379624	2011 DM_{8}	—	January 14, 2010	WISE	WISE	ADE	2.2 km	MPC · JPL
379625	2011 DZ_{8}	—	November 18, 1998	Kitt Peak	Spacewatch	·	1.2 km	MPC · JPL
379626	2011 DN_{9}	—	December 27, 2005	Kitt Peak	Spacewatch	·	2.1 km	MPC · JPL
379627	2011 DM_{10}	—	January 16, 2011	Mount Lemmon	Mount Lemmon Survey	·	860 m	MPC · JPL
379628	2011 DM_{13}	—	September 25, 2009	Catalina	CSS	·	1.8 km	MPC · JPL
379629	2011 DN_{13}	—	April 30, 2008	Mount Lemmon	Mount Lemmon Survey	·	1.1 km	MPC · JPL
379630	2011 DM_{14}	—	September 28, 2006	Mount Lemmon	Mount Lemmon Survey	·	840 m	MPC · JPL
379631	2011 DH_{18}	—	February 10, 2011	Mount Lemmon	Mount Lemmon Survey	·	1.6 km	MPC · JPL
379632	2011 DH_{22}	—	January 25, 2007	Kitt Peak	Spacewatch	·	1.1 km	MPC · JPL
379633	2011 DC_{23}	—	February 26, 2011	Kitt Peak	Spacewatch	NEM	2.7 km	MPC · JPL
379634	2011 DH_{24}	—	September 15, 2009	Kitt Peak	Spacewatch	·	1.8 km	MPC · JPL
379635	2011 DX_{24}	—	November 20, 2006	Kitt Peak	Spacewatch	MAS	750 m	MPC · JPL
379636	2011 DO_{25}	—	January 8, 2011	Mount Lemmon	Mount Lemmon Survey	·	1.2 km	MPC · JPL
379637	2011 DE_{27}	—	October 26, 2005	Kitt Peak	Spacewatch	·	1.2 km	MPC · JPL
379638	2011 DG_{31}	—	September 15, 2004	Kitt Peak	Spacewatch	·	1.6 km	MPC · JPL
379639	2011 DK_{37}	—	February 26, 2007	Mount Lemmon	Mount Lemmon Survey	·	1.9 km	MPC · JPL
379640	2011 DP_{39}	—	December 11, 2006	Kitt Peak	Spacewatch	NYS	1.2 km	MPC · JPL
379641	2011 DX_{39}	—	October 26, 2005	Kitt Peak	Spacewatch	·	1.2 km	MPC · JPL
379642	2011 EB_{1}	—	February 17, 2007	Mount Lemmon	Mount Lemmon Survey	·	1.5 km	MPC · JPL
379643	2011 ET_{6}	—	December 22, 2003	Kitt Peak	Spacewatch	·	550 m	MPC · JPL
379644	2011 EY_{7}	—	September 7, 1996	Kitt Peak	Spacewatch	·	3.2 km	MPC · JPL
379645	2011 EY_{17}	—	April 11, 2007	Siding Spring	SSS	·	1.7 km	MPC · JPL
379646	2011 EL_{18}	—	November 21, 2006	Mount Lemmon	Mount Lemmon Survey	NYS	1.0 km	MPC · JPL
379647	2011 EG_{19}	—	January 5, 2000	Kitt Peak	Spacewatch	ERI	1.9 km	MPC · JPL
379648	2011 EA_{22}	—	September 7, 2004	Kitt Peak	Spacewatch	WIT	1.2 km	MPC · JPL
379649	2011 EF_{22}	—	January 24, 2007	Catalina	CSS	·	1.5 km	MPC · JPL
379650	2011 EU_{23}	—	February 16, 2007	Mount Lemmon	Mount Lemmon Survey	·	2.0 km	MPC · JPL
379651	2011 EZ_{24}	—	January 10, 2003	Socorro	LINEAR	·	1.4 km	MPC · JPL
379652	2011 EK_{25}	—	April 22, 2007	Mount Lemmon	Mount Lemmon Survey	·	1.4 km	MPC · JPL
379653	2011 EF_{28}	—	February 26, 2007	Mount Lemmon	Mount Lemmon Survey	·	1.5 km	MPC · JPL
379654	2011 EF_{29}	—	January 29, 2011	Kitt Peak	Spacewatch	·	2.4 km	MPC · JPL
379655	2011 EA_{38}	—	November 17, 2009	Kitt Peak	Spacewatch	WIT	1.2 km	MPC · JPL
379656	2011 EN_{39}	—	March 13, 2005	Kitt Peak	Spacewatch	·	3.5 km	MPC · JPL
379657	2011 EN_{42}	—	March 16, 2007	Mount Lemmon	Mount Lemmon Survey	·	1.8 km	MPC · JPL
379658	2011 EB_{43}	—	September 15, 1998	Kitt Peak	Spacewatch	·	960 m	MPC · JPL
379659	2011 EB_{44}	—	November 9, 2009	Kitt Peak	Spacewatch	·	1.3 km	MPC · JPL
379660	2011 EZ_{49}	—	December 14, 2006	Kitt Peak	Spacewatch	V	720 m	MPC · JPL
379661	2011 EN_{53}	—	April 18, 2007	Kitt Peak	Spacewatch	·	1.9 km	MPC · JPL
379662	2011 EW_{66}	—	September 15, 2009	Kitt Peak	Spacewatch	·	1.1 km	MPC · JPL
379663	2011 EF_{68}	—	January 29, 2007	Kitt Peak	Spacewatch	(5)	1.5 km	MPC · JPL
379664	2011 EX_{68}	—	January 7, 2006	Kitt Peak	Spacewatch	·	2.5 km	MPC · JPL
379665	2011 EG_{75}	—	December 24, 2006	Kitt Peak	Spacewatch	·	2.1 km	MPC · JPL
379666	2011 EB_{77}	—	April 14, 2007	Mount Lemmon	Mount Lemmon Survey	·	2.5 km	MPC · JPL
379667	2011 EN_{78}	—	February 9, 2005	Kitt Peak	Spacewatch	THM	2.6 km	MPC · JPL
379668	2011 EQ_{78}	—	February 26, 2007	Mount Lemmon	Mount Lemmon Survey	·	1.4 km	MPC · JPL
379669	2011 EM_{81}	—	March 14, 2007	Kitt Peak	Spacewatch	·	2.4 km	MPC · JPL
379670	2011 ER_{86}	—	October 19, 2006	Mount Lemmon	Mount Lemmon Survey	PHO	740 m	MPC · JPL
379671	2011 FE_{7}	—	February 16, 2007	Catalina	CSS	·	1.6 km	MPC · JPL
379672	2011 FT_{11}	—	April 11, 2003	Kitt Peak	Spacewatch	·	1.2 km	MPC · JPL
379673	2011 FE_{16}	—	November 24, 2009	Kitt Peak	Spacewatch	·	2.2 km	MPC · JPL
379674	2011 FO_{16}	—	September 29, 2008	Mount Lemmon	Mount Lemmon Survey	·	2.8 km	MPC · JPL
379675	2011 FC_{17}	—	November 9, 2009	Mount Lemmon	Mount Lemmon Survey	·	1.6 km	MPC · JPL
379676	2011 FC_{19}	—	May 10, 2007	Mount Lemmon	Mount Lemmon Survey	MIS	2.5 km	MPC · JPL
379677	2011 FD_{21}	—	April 15, 2007	Mount Lemmon	Mount Lemmon Survey	·	1.5 km	MPC · JPL
379678	2011 FG_{24}	—	November 30, 2005	Socorro	LINEAR	·	1.5 km	MPC · JPL
379679	2011 FF_{26}	—	April 20, 2006	Kitt Peak	Spacewatch	·	2.4 km	MPC · JPL
379680	2011 FP_{27}	—	November 3, 2008	Catalina	CSS	·	4.0 km	MPC · JPL
379681	2011 FJ_{28}	—	October 15, 2004	Mount Lemmon	Mount Lemmon Survey	·	2.6 km	MPC · JPL
379682	2011 FX_{29}	—	September 12, 2007	Mount Lemmon	Mount Lemmon Survey	·	3.3 km	MPC · JPL
379683	2011 FZ_{30}	—	October 25, 1995	Kitt Peak	Spacewatch	·	1.9 km	MPC · JPL
379684	2011 FB_{31}	—	October 30, 1999	Kitt Peak	Spacewatch	·	2.5 km	MPC · JPL
379685	2011 FM_{37}	—	October 8, 2004	Kitt Peak	Spacewatch	·	2.7 km	MPC · JPL
379686	2011 FR_{37}	—	October 25, 2005	Kitt Peak	Spacewatch	·	1.5 km	MPC · JPL
379687	2011 FV_{38}	—	October 6, 2004	Kitt Peak	Spacewatch	·	1.9 km	MPC · JPL
379688	2011 FW_{39}	—	October 9, 2004	Kitt Peak	Spacewatch	·	2.3 km	MPC · JPL
379689	2011 FY_{46}	—	May 1, 2006	Kitt Peak	Spacewatch	·	1.7 km	MPC · JPL
379690	2011 FL_{47}	—	November 17, 2009	Mount Lemmon	Mount Lemmon Survey	DOR	2.4 km	MPC · JPL
379691	2011 FH_{57}	—	April 1, 2010	WISE	WISE	·	2.9 km	MPC · JPL
379692	2011 FT_{58}	—	March 30, 2000	Kitt Peak	Spacewatch	MAS	680 m	MPC · JPL
379693	2011 FY_{60}	—	September 23, 2008	Kitt Peak	Spacewatch	·	2.1 km	MPC · JPL
379694	2011 FQ_{72}	—	December 24, 2006	Kitt Peak	Spacewatch	MAS	650 m	MPC · JPL
379695	2011 FW_{74}	—	January 17, 2007	Kitt Peak	Spacewatch	·	980 m	MPC · JPL
379696	2011 FO_{79}	—	April 28, 2007	Kitt Peak	Spacewatch	AGN	1.4 km	MPC · JPL
379697	2011 FB_{81}	—	September 7, 1999	Socorro	LINEAR	·	2.7 km	MPC · JPL
379698	2011 FH_{84}	—	March 26, 2007	Mount Lemmon	Mount Lemmon Survey	HNS	1.2 km	MPC · JPL
379699	2011 FF_{93}	—	October 5, 2004	Kitt Peak	Spacewatch	·	1.3 km	MPC · JPL
379700	2011 FT_{121}	—	October 7, 2004	Kitt Peak	Spacewatch	·	1.9 km	MPC · JPL

== 379701–379800 ==
back to top

Designation			Discovery			Properties		Ref
Permanent	Provisional	Named after	Date	Site	Discoverer(s)	Category	Diam.	Ref
379701	2011 FP_{126}	—	February 10, 2011	Mount Lemmon	Mount Lemmon Survey	·	1.0 km	MPC · JPL
379702	2011 FT_{140}	—	November 26, 2009	Mount Lemmon	Mount Lemmon Survey	·	1.8 km	MPC · JPL
379703	2011 FS_{141}	—	January 13, 2002	Kitt Peak	Spacewatch	EUN	1.4 km	MPC · JPL
379704	2011 FK_{142}	—	April 26, 2010	WISE	WISE	·	4.1 km	MPC · JPL
379705	2011 FC_{144}	—	September 15, 2004	Kitt Peak	Spacewatch	·	1.6 km	MPC · JPL
379706	2011 FK_{150}	—	February 4, 2006	Catalina	CSS	·	2.3 km	MPC · JPL
379707	2011 FR_{151}	—	February 7, 2002	Socorro	LINEAR	·	2.4 km	MPC · JPL
379708	2011 FK_{153}	—	October 20, 2008	Kitt Peak	Spacewatch	EOS	2.3 km	MPC · JPL
379709	2011 GG_{2}	—	April 19, 2006	Kitt Peak	Spacewatch	·	2.9 km	MPC · JPL
379710	2011 GV_{3}	—	January 27, 2007	Mount Lemmon	Mount Lemmon Survey	·	1.0 km	MPC · JPL
379711	2011 GE_{11}	—	October 30, 2005	Catalina	CSS	·	2.5 km	MPC · JPL
379712	2011 GS_{11}	—	May 26, 2007	Mount Lemmon	Mount Lemmon Survey	·	1.7 km	MPC · JPL
379713	2011 GA_{12}	—	March 26, 2007	Mount Lemmon	Mount Lemmon Survey	·	1.6 km	MPC · JPL
379714	2011 GL_{17}	—	May 11, 2007	Mount Lemmon	Mount Lemmon Survey	·	1.7 km	MPC · JPL
379715	2011 GR_{25}	—	March 4, 2006	Kitt Peak	Spacewatch	·	1.9 km	MPC · JPL
379716	2011 GY_{28}	—	October 18, 1995	Kitt Peak	Spacewatch	·	1.7 km	MPC · JPL
379717	2011 GA_{29}	—	October 16, 2007	Mount Lemmon	Mount Lemmon Survey	HYG	3.2 km	MPC · JPL
379718	2011 GB_{30}	—	May 2, 2003	Kitt Peak	Spacewatch	·	1.8 km	MPC · JPL
379719	2011 GQ_{31}	—	September 7, 2004	Kitt Peak	Spacewatch	·	1.4 km	MPC · JPL
379720	2011 GR_{31}	—	March 30, 2000	Kitt Peak	Spacewatch	·	3.4 km	MPC · JPL
379721	2011 GM_{39}	—	October 3, 2008	Mount Lemmon	Mount Lemmon Survey	·	2.2 km	MPC · JPL
379722	2011 GQ_{40}	—	April 20, 2007	Kitt Peak	Spacewatch	EUN	1.2 km	MPC · JPL
379723	2011 GM_{42}	—	May 29, 2008	Mount Lemmon	Mount Lemmon Survey	·	2.3 km	MPC · JPL
379724	2011 GP_{42}	—	October 4, 2004	Kitt Peak	Spacewatch	·	1.7 km	MPC · JPL
379725	2011 GQ_{44}	—	February 2, 2006	Kitt Peak	Spacewatch	·	2.0 km	MPC · JPL
379726	2011 GV_{45}	—	January 27, 2006	Mount Lemmon	Mount Lemmon Survey	·	1.8 km	MPC · JPL
379727	2011 GB_{46}	—	January 7, 2006	Kitt Peak	Spacewatch	·	1.7 km	MPC · JPL
379728	2011 GJ_{46}	—	January 25, 2010	WISE	WISE	·	1.4 km	MPC · JPL
379729	2011 GM_{47}	—	November 20, 2003	Kitt Peak	Spacewatch	·	2.0 km	MPC · JPL
379730	2011 GY_{47}	—	October 6, 1999	Socorro	LINEAR	·	2.5 km	MPC · JPL
379731	2011 GS_{48}	—	September 30, 2003	Kitt Peak	Spacewatch	·	2.0 km	MPC · JPL
379732 Oklay	2011 GY_{54}	Oklay	January 8, 2002	Cima Ekar	ADAS	EUN	1.5 km	MPC · JPL
379733	2011 GQ_{55}	—	May 8, 2006	Mount Lemmon	Mount Lemmon Survey	·	1.9 km	MPC · JPL
379734	2011 GR_{55}	—	November 22, 2008	Kitt Peak	Spacewatch	·	4.5 km	MPC · JPL
379735	2011 GL_{57}	—	March 8, 2005	Mount Lemmon	Mount Lemmon Survey	·	2.6 km	MPC · JPL
379736	2011 GN_{57}	—	January 16, 2011	Mount Lemmon	Mount Lemmon Survey	·	2.8 km	MPC · JPL
379737	2011 GZ_{58}	—	March 12, 2007	Mount Lemmon	Mount Lemmon Survey	·	1.8 km	MPC · JPL
379738	2011 GF_{63}	—	November 9, 2009	Catalina	CSS	·	2.0 km	MPC · JPL
379739	2011 GW_{63}	—	November 9, 2008	Kitt Peak	Spacewatch	·	3.8 km	MPC · JPL
379740	2011 GY_{63}	—	May 6, 2006	Mount Lemmon	Mount Lemmon Survey	EOS	2.2 km	MPC · JPL
379741	2011 GD_{65}	—	December 9, 2004	Catalina	CSS	·	3.1 km	MPC · JPL
379742	2011 GH_{66}	—	November 2, 2008	Mount Lemmon	Mount Lemmon Survey	·	2.6 km	MPC · JPL
379743	2011 GW_{66}	—	January 9, 2002	Socorro	LINEAR	·	1.7 km	MPC · JPL
379744	2011 GB_{70}	—	May 2, 2005	Kitt Peak	Spacewatch	·	3.6 km	MPC · JPL
379745	2011 GN_{72}	—	May 7, 2006	Kitt Peak	Spacewatch	·	2.3 km	MPC · JPL
379746	2011 GP_{72}	—	December 18, 2009	Kitt Peak	Spacewatch	·	1.9 km	MPC · JPL
379747	2011 GW_{74}	—	November 20, 2008	Mount Lemmon	Mount Lemmon Survey	·	3.3 km	MPC · JPL
379748	2011 GE_{75}	—	March 11, 2005	Kitt Peak	Spacewatch	·	3.3 km	MPC · JPL
379749	2011 GU_{75}	—	October 3, 2008	Mount Lemmon	Mount Lemmon Survey	·	2.1 km	MPC · JPL
379750	2011 GK_{79}	—	January 26, 2006	Mount Lemmon	Mount Lemmon Survey	·	1.9 km	MPC · JPL
379751	2011 GE_{81}	—	March 10, 2005	Anderson Mesa	LONEOS	·	4.3 km	MPC · JPL
379752	2011 GN_{82}	—	April 19, 2002	Kitt Peak	Spacewatch	GEF	1.4 km	MPC · JPL
379753	2011 GJ_{84}	—	October 22, 2005	Kitt Peak	Spacewatch	·	3.0 km	MPC · JPL
379754	2011 GP_{84}	—	October 27, 2008	Mount Lemmon	Mount Lemmon Survey	·	2.2 km	MPC · JPL
379755	2011 GU_{84}	—	March 2, 2011	Mount Lemmon	Mount Lemmon Survey	·	2.8 km	MPC · JPL
379756	2011 GC_{85}	—	May 31, 2006	Mount Lemmon	Mount Lemmon Survey	·	3.4 km	MPC · JPL
379757	2011 GB_{88}	—	November 29, 2000	Kitt Peak	Spacewatch	·	4.0 km	MPC · JPL
379758	2011 HU_{2}	—	October 26, 2008	Mount Lemmon	Mount Lemmon Survey	·	3.8 km	MPC · JPL
379759	2011 HU_{5}	—	March 28, 2011	Kitt Peak	Spacewatch	EUN	1.7 km	MPC · JPL
379760	2011 HZ_{5}	—	March 21, 1998	Kitt Peak	Spacewatch	·	2.0 km	MPC · JPL
379761	2011 HL_{6}	—	March 9, 2005	Catalina	CSS	TIR	3.8 km	MPC · JPL
379762	2011 HP_{8}	—	December 17, 2001	Socorro	LINEAR	MAR	1.2 km	MPC · JPL
379763	2011 HW_{9}	—	October 8, 2008	Catalina	CSS	·	2.4 km	MPC · JPL
379764	2011 HF_{10}	—	April 6, 2011	Mount Lemmon	Mount Lemmon Survey	·	3.0 km	MPC · JPL
379765	2011 HO_{10}	—	February 24, 2010	WISE	WISE	GEF	2.1 km	MPC · JPL
379766	2011 HY_{16}	—	October 31, 2008	Kitt Peak	Spacewatch	·	2.6 km	MPC · JPL
379767 Barcis	2011 HH_{20}	Barcis	September 28, 2003	Kitt Peak	Spacewatch	·	2.1 km	MPC · JPL
379768	2011 HL_{21}	—	November 2, 1999	Kitt Peak	Spacewatch	·	2.3 km	MPC · JPL
379769	2011 HC_{25}	—	May 6, 2010	WISE	WISE	·	4.5 km	MPC · JPL
379770	2011 HL_{26}	—	February 10, 2002	Socorro	LINEAR	·	1.3 km	MPC · JPL
379771	2011 HE_{28}	—	December 29, 2005	Kitt Peak	Spacewatch	·	1.6 km	MPC · JPL
379772	2011 HK_{28}	—	October 6, 2005	Kitt Peak	Spacewatch	·	580 m	MPC · JPL
379773	2011 HB_{29}	—	October 7, 2000	Kitt Peak	Spacewatch	·	1.6 km	MPC · JPL
379774	2011 HE_{31}	—	April 6, 2011	Kitt Peak	Spacewatch	GEF	1.7 km	MPC · JPL
379775	2011 HZ_{37}	—	December 1, 2008	Kitt Peak	Spacewatch	·	4.5 km	MPC · JPL
379776	2011 HD_{45}	—	October 12, 2007	Catalina	CSS	·	3.4 km	MPC · JPL
379777	2011 HU_{47}	—	September 14, 2007	Catalina	CSS	EOS	2.4 km	MPC · JPL
379778	2011 HX_{48}	—	May 22, 2006	Kitt Peak	Spacewatch	·	2.5 km	MPC · JPL
379779	2011 HG_{51}	—	February 16, 2010	Kitt Peak	Spacewatch	·	3.0 km	MPC · JPL
379780	2011 HR_{56}	—	February 25, 2011	Mount Lemmon	Mount Lemmon Survey	·	4.0 km	MPC · JPL
379781	2011 HB_{57}	—	July 11, 2004	Socorro	LINEAR	T_{j} (2.97) · 3:2	6.1 km	MPC · JPL
379782	2011 HF_{58}	—	December 17, 2001	Kitt Peak	Spacewatch	·	1.2 km	MPC · JPL
379783	2011 HV_{62}	—	November 26, 2009	Mount Lemmon	Mount Lemmon Survey	·	1.7 km	MPC · JPL
379784	2011 HY_{65}	—	January 27, 2006	Mount Lemmon	Mount Lemmon Survey	·	1.6 km	MPC · JPL
379785	2011 HG_{67}	—	January 8, 2010	Kitt Peak	Spacewatch	·	2.4 km	MPC · JPL
379786	2011 HB_{68}	—	January 25, 2006	Kitt Peak	Spacewatch	·	2.1 km	MPC · JPL
379787	2011 HO_{69}	—	September 13, 2007	Mount Lemmon	Mount Lemmon Survey	·	2.8 km	MPC · JPL
379788	2011 HP_{69}	—	December 17, 2009	Mount Lemmon	Mount Lemmon Survey	HOF	3.1 km	MPC · JPL
379789	2011 HQ_{69}	—	February 1, 2006	Kitt Peak	Spacewatch	·	1.9 km	MPC · JPL
379790	2011 HT_{69}	—	December 6, 2005	Kitt Peak	Spacewatch	(5)	1.3 km	MPC · JPL
379791	2011 HH_{71}	—	April 25, 2007	Mount Lemmon	Mount Lemmon Survey	·	1.2 km	MPC · JPL
379792	2011 HO_{82}	—	April 14, 2005	Catalina	CSS	EUP	5.5 km	MPC · JPL
379793	2011 HB_{84}	—	March 9, 2005	Catalina	CSS	·	3.2 km	MPC · JPL
379794	2011 HC_{84}	—	November 21, 2005	Catalina	CSS	·	1.4 km	MPC · JPL
379795	2011 HF_{84}	—	November 25, 2009	Catalina	CSS	·	2.6 km	MPC · JPL
379796	2011 HL_{85}	—	October 29, 2005	Mount Lemmon	Mount Lemmon Survey	·	1.3 km	MPC · JPL
379797	2011 HB_{86}	—	August 10, 2007	Kitt Peak	Spacewatch	·	2.5 km	MPC · JPL
379798	2011 HL_{87}	—	November 9, 2008	Mount Lemmon	Mount Lemmon Survey	EOS	2.0 km	MPC · JPL
379799	2011 HP_{93}	—	September 14, 2007	Catalina	CSS	·	4.4 km	MPC · JPL
379800	2011 JJ_{4}	—	December 17, 2003	Kitt Peak	Spacewatch	·	4.5 km	MPC · JPL

== 379801–379900 ==
back to top

Designation			Discovery			Properties		Ref
Permanent	Provisional	Named after	Date	Site	Discoverer(s)	Category	Diam.	Ref
379801	2011 JK_{6}	—	November 4, 2005	Mount Lemmon	Mount Lemmon Survey	·	1.1 km	MPC · JPL
379802	2011 JP_{7}	—	March 14, 2010	Mount Lemmon	Mount Lemmon Survey	·	2.7 km	MPC · JPL
379803	2011 JS_{7}	—	May 31, 2000	Kitt Peak	Spacewatch	·	3.7 km	MPC · JPL
379804	2011 JF_{9}	—	April 6, 2005	Mount Lemmon	Mount Lemmon Survey	·	3.0 km	MPC · JPL
379805	2011 JY_{16}	—	February 7, 2011	Mount Lemmon	Mount Lemmon Survey	·	3.0 km	MPC · JPL
379806	2011 JK_{20}	—	November 9, 2008	Kitt Peak	Spacewatch	·	2.7 km	MPC · JPL
379807	2011 JB_{25}	—	September 4, 2007	Mount Lemmon	Mount Lemmon Survey	·	2.4 km	MPC · JPL
379808	2011 JJ_{25}	—	October 24, 2003	Kitt Peak	Spacewatch	·	1.9 km	MPC · JPL
379809	2011 JT_{26}	—	October 3, 2008	Mount Lemmon	Mount Lemmon Survey	NEM	2.9 km	MPC · JPL
379810	2011 KO_{3}	—	April 26, 2000	Kitt Peak	Spacewatch	·	3.1 km	MPC · JPL
379811	2011 KV_{3}	—	March 3, 2006	Catalina	CSS	·	2.8 km	MPC · JPL
379812	2011 KT_{4}	—	September 25, 2008	Kitt Peak	Spacewatch	MRX	1.4 km	MPC · JPL
379813	2011 KE_{5}	—	September 9, 2007	Kitt Peak	Spacewatch	EOS	2.1 km	MPC · JPL
379814	2011 KT_{11}	—	May 5, 2011	Siding Spring	SSS	TIR	4.4 km	MPC · JPL
379815	2011 KG_{18}	—	April 2, 2005	Mount Lemmon	Mount Lemmon Survey	THM	2.3 km	MPC · JPL
379816	2011 KT_{20}	—	October 23, 2004	Kitt Peak	Spacewatch	AEO	1.4 km	MPC · JPL
379817	2011 KE_{28}	—	May 28, 2000	Socorro	LINEAR	·	3.8 km	MPC · JPL
379818	2011 KC_{29}	—	November 30, 2008	Kitt Peak	Spacewatch	·	4.4 km	MPC · JPL
379819	2011 KK_{34}	—	September 9, 2007	Kitt Peak	Spacewatch	·	4.6 km	MPC · JPL
379820	2011 KU_{43}	—	May 22, 2006	Kitt Peak	Spacewatch	·	2.1 km	MPC · JPL
379821	2011 KV_{43}	—	March 8, 2005	Kitt Peak	Spacewatch	EOS	1.7 km	MPC · JPL
379822	2011 KV_{44}	—	October 6, 2008	Mount Lemmon	Mount Lemmon Survey	·	2.1 km	MPC · JPL
379823	2011 KD_{45}	—	April 24, 2006	Kitt Peak	Spacewatch	·	1.8 km	MPC · JPL
379824	2011 KO_{45}	—	January 12, 2010	Catalina	CSS	·	2.4 km	MPC · JPL
379825	2011 KE_{47}	—	November 23, 1997	Kitt Peak	Spacewatch	·	2.9 km	MPC · JPL
379826	2011 LW_{6}	—	September 29, 1997	Kitt Peak	Spacewatch	EMA	3.5 km	MPC · JPL
379827	2011 LN_{7}	—	February 14, 2004	Socorro	LINEAR	EOS	2.7 km	MPC · JPL
379828	2011 LA_{8}	—	December 21, 2008	Catalina	CSS	·	4.1 km	MPC · JPL
379829	2011 LK_{9}	—	November 20, 2008	Kitt Peak	Spacewatch	EOS	1.9 km	MPC · JPL
379830	2011 LU_{9}	—	May 22, 2011	Kitt Peak	Spacewatch	EOS	2.5 km	MPC · JPL
379831	2011 LL_{10}	—	June 4, 2011	Catalina	CSS	·	3.9 km	MPC · JPL
379832	2011 LA_{18}	—	February 16, 2010	Kitt Peak	Spacewatch	·	4.3 km	MPC · JPL
379833	2011 LT_{22}	—	December 20, 2004	Mount Lemmon	Mount Lemmon Survey	KOR	2.0 km	MPC · JPL
379834	2011 LZ_{22}	—	March 10, 2005	Mount Lemmon	Mount Lemmon Survey	·	2.4 km	MPC · JPL
379835	2011 PE_{3}	—	December 14, 2004	Kitt Peak	Spacewatch	L5	10 km	MPC · JPL
379836	2011 QF	—	April 16, 2010	WISE	WISE	L5	20 km	MPC · JPL
379837	2011 QP_{3}	—	April 9, 2010	WISE	WISE	L5	10 km	MPC · JPL
379838	2011 QD_{37}	—	December 18, 2004	Mount Lemmon	Mount Lemmon Survey	·	1.1 km	MPC · JPL
379839	2011 QQ_{42}	—	April 19, 2010	WISE	WISE	L5	8.2 km	MPC · JPL
379840	2011 SG_{69}	—	October 2, 1999	Kitt Peak	Spacewatch	L5	8.5 km	MPC · JPL
379841	2011 UV_{173}	—	August 22, 2001	Socorro	LINEAR	·	780 m	MPC · JPL
379842	2011 UK_{178}	—	November 27, 2006	Kitt Peak	Spacewatch	fast	2.0 km	MPC · JPL
379843	2012 AM_{17}	—	December 28, 2003	Kitt Peak	Spacewatch	H	490 m	MPC · JPL
379844	2012 BJ_{72}	—	December 27, 2011	Mount Lemmon	Mount Lemmon Survey	L4	10 km	MPC · JPL
379845	2012 BP_{84}	—	October 24, 2005	Kitt Peak	Spacewatch	·	1.6 km	MPC · JPL
379846	2012 BB_{123}	—	March 10, 2007	Kitt Peak	Spacewatch	·	1.9 km	MPC · JPL
379847	2012 CT_{25}	—	August 29, 2006	Catalina	CSS	V	870 m	MPC · JPL
379848	2012 DB_{31}	—	August 31, 2005	Anderson Mesa	LONEOS	H	660 m	MPC · JPL
379849	2012 DK_{38}	—	November 6, 1999	Kitt Peak	Spacewatch	H	460 m	MPC · JPL
379850	2012 DJ_{49}	—	April 27, 2009	Catalina	CSS	·	800 m	MPC · JPL
379851	2012 EB_{8}	—	January 13, 2008	Kitt Peak	Spacewatch	·	750 m	MPC · JPL
379852	2012 EO_{9}	—	October 28, 2005	Mount Lemmon	Mount Lemmon Survey	H	550 m	MPC · JPL
379853	2012 FO_{32}	—	March 29, 2008	Catalina	CSS	·	2.9 km	MPC · JPL
379854	2012 FK_{74}	—	January 10, 2008	Kitt Peak	Spacewatch	NYS	960 m	MPC · JPL
379855	2012 FN_{76}	—	November 2, 2007	Kitt Peak	Spacewatch	·	820 m	MPC · JPL
379856	2012 GP_{6}	—	September 21, 2003	Kitt Peak	Spacewatch	·	740 m	MPC · JPL
379857	2012 GP_{26}	—	October 17, 2010	Mount Lemmon	Mount Lemmon Survey	·	920 m	MPC · JPL
379858	2012 GQ_{26}	—	September 10, 2010	Mount Lemmon	Mount Lemmon Survey	·	860 m	MPC · JPL
379859	2012 GV_{31}	—	May 10, 2008	Siding Spring	SSS	·	1.4 km	MPC · JPL
379860	2012 GU_{32}	—	June 22, 2006	Kitt Peak	Spacewatch	·	760 m	MPC · JPL
379861	2012 GA_{33}	—	March 11, 2005	Mount Lemmon	Mount Lemmon Survey	·	670 m	MPC · JPL
379862	2012 HJ	—	April 19, 2007	Mount Lemmon	Mount Lemmon Survey	H	610 m	MPC · JPL
379863	2012 HP	—	April 22, 2007	Kitt Peak	Spacewatch	H	570 m	MPC · JPL
379864	2012 HK_{3}	—	January 6, 2010	Kitt Peak	Spacewatch	·	2.6 km	MPC · JPL
379865	2012 HA_{5}	—	April 9, 2005	Kitt Peak	Spacewatch	·	1.1 km	MPC · JPL
379866	2012 HP_{14}	—	September 18, 2006	Catalina	CSS	V	710 m	MPC · JPL
379867	2012 HC_{17}	—	March 13, 2007	Kitt Peak	Spacewatch	BRA	1.3 km	MPC · JPL
379868	2012 HV_{22}	—	October 4, 2010	Mount Lemmon	Mount Lemmon Survey	H	650 m	MPC · JPL
379869	2012 HH_{23}	—	December 13, 2006	Kitt Peak	Spacewatch	·	1.7 km	MPC · JPL
379870	2012 HA_{26}	—	October 27, 2008	Mount Lemmon	Mount Lemmon Survey	·	3.5 km	MPC · JPL
379871	2012 HW_{33}	—	October 5, 2002	Socorro	LINEAR	H	610 m	MPC · JPL
379872	2012 HU_{34}	—	February 9, 2005	Mount Lemmon	Mount Lemmon Survey	·	650 m	MPC · JPL
379873	2012 HS_{35}	—	February 7, 2002	Kitt Peak	Spacewatch	·	770 m	MPC · JPL
379874	2012 HB_{39}	—	October 12, 2010	Mount Lemmon	Mount Lemmon Survey	·	830 m	MPC · JPL
379875	2012 HP_{39}	—	July 19, 2007	Siding Spring	SSS	·	2.9 km	MPC · JPL
379876	2012 HX_{44}	—	October 14, 1999	Kitt Peak	Spacewatch	·	770 m	MPC · JPL
379877	2012 HB_{47}	—	November 9, 1994	Kitt Peak	Spacewatch	H	470 m	MPC · JPL
379878	2012 HN_{47}	—	October 1, 2005	Mount Lemmon	Mount Lemmon Survey	·	1.5 km	MPC · JPL
379879	2012 HB_{49}	—	August 2, 2008	Siding Spring	SSS	·	2.9 km	MPC · JPL
379880	2012 HL_{51}	—	August 26, 2009	Catalina	CSS	·	1.1 km	MPC · JPL
379881	2012 HH_{55}	—	July 6, 2000	Kitt Peak	Spacewatch	(5)	2.1 km	MPC · JPL
379882	2012 HX_{60}	—	March 13, 2008	Mount Lemmon	Mount Lemmon Survey	·	1.1 km	MPC · JPL
379883	2012 HV_{61}	—	January 1, 2008	Kitt Peak	Spacewatch	·	840 m	MPC · JPL
379884	2012 HJ_{62}	—	September 12, 2009	Kitt Peak	Spacewatch	·	2.0 km	MPC · JPL
379885	2012 HG_{63}	—	March 11, 2008	Kitt Peak	Spacewatch	NYS	1.1 km	MPC · JPL
379886	2012 HL_{63}	—	September 25, 2009	Kitt Peak	Spacewatch	NYS	1.2 km	MPC · JPL
379887	2012 HC_{67}	—	February 25, 2012	Mount Lemmon	Mount Lemmon Survey	V	730 m	MPC · JPL
379888	2012 HH_{67}	—	December 2, 2005	Mount Lemmon	Mount Lemmon Survey	·	1.4 km	MPC · JPL
379889	2012 HV_{67}	—	November 3, 2005	Mount Lemmon	Mount Lemmon Survey	·	1.5 km	MPC · JPL
379890	2012 HE_{68}	—	October 10, 1999	Socorro	LINEAR	H	640 m	MPC · JPL
379891	2012 HF_{71}	—	February 10, 2008	Kitt Peak	Spacewatch	·	1.1 km	MPC · JPL
379892	2012 HO_{72}	—	August 4, 2008	Siding Spring	SSS	·	2.4 km	MPC · JPL
379893	2012 HB_{73}	—	February 7, 2008	Kitt Peak	Spacewatch	NYS	1.0 km	MPC · JPL
379894	2012 HN_{80}	—	January 19, 2008	Kitt Peak	Spacewatch	·	680 m	MPC · JPL
379895	2012 HZ_{81}	—	October 18, 2006	Kitt Peak	Spacewatch	V	770 m	MPC · JPL
379896	2012 HN_{82}	—	February 16, 2007	Mount Lemmon	Mount Lemmon Survey	(5)	2.1 km	MPC · JPL
379897	2012 JF_{2}	—	March 31, 2003	Kitt Peak	Spacewatch	EUN	1.5 km	MPC · JPL
379898	2012 JG_{4}	—	September 2, 2000	Prescott	P. G. Comba	·	1.3 km	MPC · JPL
379899	2012 JX_{7}	—	September 28, 2006	Mount Lemmon	Mount Lemmon Survey	·	750 m	MPC · JPL
379900	2012 JQ_{13}	—	July 2, 2008	Kitt Peak	Spacewatch	·	1.7 km	MPC · JPL

== 379901–380000 ==
back to top

Designation			Discovery			Properties		Ref
Permanent	Provisional	Named after	Date	Site	Discoverer(s)	Category	Diam.	Ref
379901	2012 JA_{16}	—	June 3, 2006	Mount Lemmon	Mount Lemmon Survey	·	940 m	MPC · JPL
379902	2012 JZ_{19}	—	March 11, 2005	Kitt Peak	Spacewatch	·	750 m	MPC · JPL
379903	2012 JF_{25}	—	October 12, 2009	Mount Lemmon	Mount Lemmon Survey	·	2.0 km	MPC · JPL
379904	2012 JG_{26}	—	June 9, 2005	Kitt Peak	Spacewatch	·	1.4 km	MPC · JPL
379905	2012 JH_{26}	—	September 22, 2008	Mount Lemmon	Mount Lemmon Survey	·	2.5 km	MPC · JPL
379906	2012 JR_{27}	—	December 10, 2010	Mount Lemmon	Mount Lemmon Survey	·	1.1 km	MPC · JPL
379907	2012 JJ_{34}	—	October 27, 2005	Kitt Peak	Spacewatch	·	1.1 km	MPC · JPL
379908	2012 JW_{34}	—	November 26, 2009	Mount Lemmon	Mount Lemmon Survey	·	2.1 km	MPC · JPL
379909	2012 JF_{37}	—	December 1, 2005	Mount Lemmon	Mount Lemmon Survey	(5)	1.3 km	MPC · JPL
379910	2012 JN_{53}	—	October 14, 2004	Kitt Peak	Spacewatch	·	1.9 km	MPC · JPL
379911	2012 JH_{58}	—	September 30, 2006	Mount Lemmon	Mount Lemmon Survey	·	1.1 km	MPC · JPL
379912	2012 JZ_{58}	—	April 27, 2009	Mount Lemmon	Mount Lemmon Survey	·	1.2 km	MPC · JPL
379913	2012 JX_{59}	—	April 5, 2008	Mount Lemmon	Mount Lemmon Survey	·	950 m	MPC · JPL
379914	2012 JK_{63}	—	November 16, 2006	Kitt Peak	Spacewatch	V	710 m	MPC · JPL
379915	2012 JU_{64}	—	October 11, 2005	Kitt Peak	Spacewatch	·	1.3 km	MPC · JPL
379916	2012 JL_{65}	—	April 1, 2005	Kitt Peak	Spacewatch	·	860 m	MPC · JPL
379917	2012 JT_{65}	—	August 15, 2009	Siding Spring	SSS	PHO	1.2 km	MPC · JPL
379918	2012 JE_{66}	—	March 26, 2001	Socorro	LINEAR	ERI	1.8 km	MPC · JPL
379919	2012 JG_{66}	—	December 6, 2005	Kitt Peak	Spacewatch	(5)	2.2 km	MPC · JPL
379920	2012 KQ_{11}	—	September 24, 1960	Palomar	C. J. van Houten, I. van Houten-Groeneveld, T. Gehrels	·	1.4 km	MPC · JPL
379921	2012 KL_{15}	—	November 30, 2005	Kitt Peak	Spacewatch	·	1.9 km	MPC · JPL
379922	2012 KT_{18}	—	December 27, 2006	Mount Lemmon	Mount Lemmon Survey	·	2.1 km	MPC · JPL
379923	2012 KC_{27}	—	May 8, 2005	Kitt Peak	Spacewatch	(2076)	980 m	MPC · JPL
379924	2012 KX_{27}	—	January 29, 2011	Mount Lemmon	Mount Lemmon Survey	·	1.6 km	MPC · JPL
379925	2012 KO_{34}	—	August 29, 2000	Socorro	LINEAR	(5)	1.6 km	MPC · JPL
379926	2012 KZ_{42}	—	March 16, 2007	Catalina	CSS	·	2.9 km	MPC · JPL
379927	2012 KJ_{44}	—	March 26, 2003	Kitt Peak	Spacewatch	·	1.6 km	MPC · JPL
379928	2012 KW_{44}	—	October 18, 2009	Mount Lemmon	Mount Lemmon Survey	·	1.9 km	MPC · JPL
379929	2012 KK_{49}	—	October 23, 2006	Mount Lemmon	Mount Lemmon Survey	V	780 m	MPC · JPL
379930	2012 KX_{49}	—	October 21, 2003	Kitt Peak	Spacewatch	EOS	2.1 km	MPC · JPL
379931	2012 LQ_{2}	—	June 5, 2005	Kitt Peak	Spacewatch	·	1.3 km	MPC · JPL
379932	2012 LW_{2}	—	November 24, 2000	Kitt Peak	Spacewatch	·	2.8 km	MPC · JPL
379933	2012 LM_{4}	—	April 25, 2006	Catalina	CSS	·	4.5 km	MPC · JPL
379934	2012 LN_{4}	—	October 6, 2004	Kitt Peak	Spacewatch	·	2.2 km	MPC · JPL
379935	2012 LM_{7}	—	September 29, 2009	Mount Lemmon	Mount Lemmon Survey	MAR	1.0 km	MPC · JPL
379936	2012 LX_{7}	—	May 24, 2001	Kitt Peak	Spacewatch	·	1.4 km	MPC · JPL
379937	2012 LG_{8}	—	November 4, 2004	Catalina	CSS	·	2.3 km	MPC · JPL
379938	2012 LW_{9}	—	April 21, 2012	Mount Lemmon	Mount Lemmon Survey	·	2.7 km	MPC · JPL
379939	2012 LV_{11}	—	February 12, 2008	Mount Lemmon	Mount Lemmon Survey	V	610 m	MPC · JPL
379940	2012 LX_{14}	—	September 23, 2008	Kitt Peak	Spacewatch	·	3.6 km	MPC · JPL
379941	2012 LE_{17}	—	July 4, 2005	Mount Lemmon	Mount Lemmon Survey	·	1.8 km	MPC · JPL
379942	2012 LH_{19}	—	December 16, 2007	Mount Lemmon	Mount Lemmon Survey	·	1.2 km	MPC · JPL
379943	2012 LK_{19}	—	December 14, 2010	Mount Lemmon	Mount Lemmon Survey	·	900 m	MPC · JPL
379944	2012 LH_{23}	—	September 4, 2003	Kitt Peak	Spacewatch	·	830 m	MPC · JPL
379945	2012 MG_{1}	—	March 29, 2008	Catalina	CSS	V	730 m	MPC · JPL
379946	2012 MD_{9}	—	June 27, 2005	Kitt Peak	Spacewatch	V	630 m	MPC · JPL
379947	2012 MP_{12}	—	September 24, 2008	Mount Lemmon	Mount Lemmon Survey	EOS	2.2 km	MPC · JPL
379948	2012 MV_{12}	—	September 11, 2007	XuYi	PMO NEO Survey Program	·	3.6 km	MPC · JPL
379949	2012 OM_{1}	—	January 25, 2006	Kitt Peak	Spacewatch	L5	10 km	MPC · JPL
379950	2012 OC_{2}	—	January 27, 2010	WISE	WISE	PHO	3.4 km	MPC · JPL
379951	2012 OY_{3}	—	September 5, 2008	Kitt Peak	Spacewatch	·	2.0 km	MPC · JPL
379952	2012 PV_{14}	—	January 11, 2010	Kitt Peak	Spacewatch	·	3.4 km	MPC · JPL
379953	2012 PC_{18}	—	March 13, 2005	Catalina	CSS	EOS	2.6 km	MPC · JPL
379954	2012 PM_{20}	—	June 21, 2006	Kitt Peak	Spacewatch	·	4.3 km	MPC · JPL
379955	2012 PC_{30}	—	January 17, 2010	Kitt Peak	Spacewatch	EOS	2.8 km	MPC · JPL
379956	2012 PJ_{33}	—	January 9, 2006	Kitt Peak	Spacewatch	·	2.1 km	MPC · JPL
379957	2012 PX_{33}	—	December 4, 2008	Kitt Peak	Spacewatch	VER	3.1 km	MPC · JPL
379958	2012 PB_{39}	—	November 18, 1996	Kitt Peak	Spacewatch	VER	2.8 km	MPC · JPL
379959	2012 QD_{2}	—	May 1, 2006	Kitt Peak	Spacewatch	·	2.0 km	MPC · JPL
379960	2012 QC_{6}	—	December 21, 2003	Kitt Peak	Spacewatch	·	2.8 km	MPC · JPL
379961	2012 QA_{9}	—	October 8, 2007	Catalina	CSS	EOS	2.3 km	MPC · JPL
379962	2012 QZ_{21}	—	March 8, 2005	Kitt Peak	Spacewatch	·	2.9 km	MPC · JPL
379963	2012 QR_{25}	—	December 27, 2003	Kitt Peak	Spacewatch	·	3.8 km	MPC · JPL
379964	2012 QH_{30}	—	December 15, 2004	Kitt Peak	Spacewatch	L5	10 km	MPC · JPL
379965	2012 QV_{34}	—	April 14, 2008	Mount Lemmon	Mount Lemmon Survey	L5	10 km	MPC · JPL
379966	2012 QT_{35}	—	March 18, 2004	Socorro	LINEAR	·	4.0 km	MPC · JPL
379967	2012 QP_{39}	—	May 25, 2006	Mount Lemmon	Mount Lemmon Survey	·	4.5 km	MPC · JPL
379968	2012 QO_{40}	—	October 8, 2008	Catalina	CSS	·	3.3 km	MPC · JPL
379969	2012 QG_{44}	—	September 19, 2001	Socorro	LINEAR	THM	2.5 km	MPC · JPL
379970	2012 RL_{26}	—	July 22, 1995	Kitt Peak	Spacewatch	·	4.3 km	MPC · JPL
379971	2012 RA_{30}	—	November 6, 2008	Mount Lemmon	Mount Lemmon Survey	·	1.9 km	MPC · JPL
379972	2012 SA_{1}	—	October 8, 1999	Socorro	LINEAR	L5	10 km	MPC · JPL
379973	2012 SQ_{21}	—	March 26, 1995	Kitt Peak	Spacewatch	L5	10 km	MPC · JPL
379974	2012 SH_{28}	—	February 26, 2007	Mount Lemmon	Mount Lemmon Survey	L5	9.5 km	MPC · JPL
379975	2012 TJ_{7}	—	September 18, 2001	Kitt Peak	Spacewatch	L5	7.8 km	MPC · JPL
379976	2012 TP_{7}	—	December 16, 2003	Kitt Peak	Spacewatch	L5	10 km	MPC · JPL
379977	2012 TN_{15}	—	September 24, 2000	Socorro	LINEAR	L5	20 km	MPC · JPL
379978	2012 TH_{52}	—	February 4, 2005	Kitt Peak	Spacewatch	L5	8.8 km	MPC · JPL
379979	2012 TM_{52}	—	February 20, 2006	Mount Lemmon	Mount Lemmon Survey	L5	10 km	MPC · JPL
379980	2012 TF_{78}	—	April 13, 1996	Kitt Peak	Spacewatch	L5	10 km	MPC · JPL
379981	2012 TK_{108}	—	October 10, 2007	Mount Lemmon	Mount Lemmon Survey	·	4.6 km	MPC · JPL
379982	2012 TY_{135}	—	October 20, 2007	Mount Lemmon	Mount Lemmon Survey	HYG	3.5 km	MPC · JPL
379983	2012 TJ_{144}	—	April 22, 2010	WISE	WISE	L5	7.8 km	MPC · JPL
379984	2012 TQ_{145}	—	March 14, 2007	Mount Lemmon	Mount Lemmon Survey	L5	8.3 km	MPC · JPL
379985	2012 TM_{191}	—	January 26, 2006	Mount Lemmon	Mount Lemmon Survey	L5	8.2 km	MPC · JPL
379986	2012 TM_{241}	—	March 12, 2008	Kitt Peak	Spacewatch	L5	7.4 km	MPC · JPL
379987	2012 TK_{294}	—	April 29, 2003	Socorro	LINEAR	·	1.7 km	MPC · JPL
379988	2012 TP_{308}	—	June 13, 2005	Mount Lemmon	Mount Lemmon Survey	·	4.0 km	MPC · JPL
379989	2012 UH_{134}	—	February 19, 2009	Catalina	CSS	·	3.7 km	MPC · JPL
379990	2012 UL_{161}	—	July 4, 2005	Mount Lemmon	Mount Lemmon Survey	·	3.4 km	MPC · JPL
379991	2012 US_{166}	—	December 6, 1996	Kitt Peak	Spacewatch	·	3.3 km	MPC · JPL
379992	2012 VZ_{111}	—	June 21, 1999	Kitt Peak	Spacewatch	·	2.7 km	MPC · JPL
379993	2013 BU_{39}	—	March 25, 2010	Mount Lemmon	Mount Lemmon Survey	·	880 m	MPC · JPL
379994	2013 CS_{1}	—	March 2, 1995	Kitt Peak	Spacewatch	MAS	730 m	MPC · JPL
379995	2013 CC_{68}	—	September 20, 2006	Kitt Peak	Spacewatch	·	2.8 km	MPC · JPL
379996	2013 CX_{126}	—	August 24, 2007	Kitt Peak	Spacewatch	·	1.2 km	MPC · JPL
379997	2013 CM_{156}	—	May 8, 2006	Mount Lemmon	Mount Lemmon Survey	L4	9.8 km	MPC · JPL
379998	2013 CG_{159}	—	August 24, 2007	Kitt Peak	Spacewatch	L4	9.2 km	MPC · JPL
379999	2013 CY_{212}	—	April 18, 2009	Mount Lemmon	Mount Lemmon Survey	HOF	3.0 km	MPC · JPL
380000	2013 CB_{213}	—	April 10, 2005	Mount Lemmon	Mount Lemmon Survey	·	1.1 km	MPC · JPL

back to top

== See also ==
- Meanings of minor-planet names: 379001–380000
