= Meanings of minor-planet names: 379001–380000 =

As minor planet discoveries are confirmed, they are given a permanent number by the IAU's Minor Planet Center (MPC), and the discoverers can then submit names for them, following the IAU's naming conventions. The list below concerns those minor planets in the specified number-range that have received names, and explains the meanings of those names.

Official naming citations of newly named small Solar System bodies are approved and published in a bulletin by IAU's Working Group for Small Bodies Nomenclature (WGSBN). Before May 2021, citations were published in MPC's Minor Planet Circulars for many decades. Recent citations can also be found on the JPL Small-Body Database (SBDB). Until his death in 2016, German astronomer Lutz D. Schmadel compiled these citations into the Dictionary of Minor Planet Names (DMP) and regularly updated the collection.

Based on Paul Herget's The Names of the Minor Planets, Schmadel also researched the unclear origin of numerous asteroids, most of which had been named prior to World War II. This article incorporates text from this source, which is in the public domain: SBDB New namings may only be added to this list below after official publication as the preannouncement of names is condemned. The WGSBN publishes a comprehensive guideline for the naming rules of non-cometary small Solar System bodies.

== 379001–379100 ==
Named minor planet	Provisional	This minor planet was named for...	Ref · Catalog
There are no named minor planets in this number range

== 379101–379200 ==
back to top

Named minor planet	Provisional	This minor planet was named for...	Ref · Catalog
379130 Lopresti	2009 CA_{20}	Claudio Lopresti, an Italian amateur astronomer and founder of the Digital Astronomy Group as well as a discoverer of numerous variable stars. In 2007, he discovered the first transit of an extrasolar planet in the constellation of Cassiopeia.	JPL · 379130
379155 Volkerheinrich	2009 QR_{6}	Volker Heinrich (born 1962), a German amateur astronomer and chairman of the Astronomy Section of the "Physikalischer Verein" at Frankfurt, Germany	JPL · 379155
379173 Gamaovalia	2009 RA_{2}	Galina (born 1935), Mariya (born 1940), Oktyabrina (born 1938), Vassiliy (born 1944) and Lev (born 1947), the brothers and sisters of astronomer Klim Churyumov (1937–2016), co-discoverer of comet 67P	JPL · 379173

== 379201–379300 ==
back to top

Named minor planet	Provisional	This minor planet was named for...	Ref · Catalog
There are no named minor planets in this number range

== 379301–379400 ==
back to top

Named minor planet	Provisional	This minor planet was named for...	Ref · Catalog
There are no named minor planets in this number range

== 379401–379500 ==
back to top

Named minor planet	Provisional	This minor planet was named for...	Ref · Catalog
379470 Carolynjones	2010 DQ_{4}	Carolyn Jones, American actress who played Morticia in the 1960s sitcom The Addams Family.	IAU · 379470

== 379501–379600 ==
back to top

Named minor planet	Provisional	This minor planet was named for...	Ref · Catalog
There are no named minor planets in this number range

== 379601–379700 ==
back to top

Named minor planet	Provisional	This minor planet was named for...	Ref · Catalog
There are no named minor planets in this number range

== 379701–379800 ==
back to top

Named minor planet	Provisional	This minor planet was named for...	Ref · Catalog
379732 Oklay	2011 GY_{54}	Nilda Oklay (b. 1981), a Turkish planetary scientist.	IAU · 379732
379767 Barcis	2011 HH_{20}	Barcis is an Italian municipality in the province of Pordenone (Friuli-Venezia Giulia).	IAU · 379767

== 379801–379900 ==
back to top

Named minor planet	Provisional	This minor planet was named for...	Ref · Catalog
There are no named minor planets in this number range

== 379901–380000 ==
back to top

Named minor planet	Provisional	This minor planet was named for...	Ref · Catalog
There are no named minor planets in this number range

back to top

Preceded by 378,001–379,000	Meanings of minor-planet names List of minor planets: 379,001–380,000	Succeeded by 380,001–381,000
