= List of minor planets: 381001–382000 =

The following is a partial list of minor planets, running from minor-planet number 381001 through 382000, inclusive. The primary data for this and other partial lists is based on JPL's "Small-Body Orbital Elements" and data available from the Minor Planet Center. Critical list information is also provided by the MPC, unless otherwise specified from Lowell Observatory. A detailed description of the table's columns and additional sources are given on the main page including a complete list of every page in this series, and a statistical break-up on the dynamical classification of minor planets.

Also see the summary list of all named bodies in numerical and alphabetical order, and the corresponding naming citations for the number range of this particular list. New namings may only be added to this list after official publication, as the preannouncement of names is condemned by the Working Group for Small Bodies Nomenclature of the International Astronomical Union.

Near-Earth obj.	MBA (inner)	MBA (outer)	Centaur
Mars-crosser	MBA (middle)	Jupiter trojan	Trans-Neptunian obj.
Unclassified

== 381001–381100 ==
Designation			Discovery			Properties		Ref
Permanent	Provisional	Named after	Date	Site	Discoverer(s)	Category	Diam.	Ref
381001	2006 TZ_{64}	—	October 11, 2006	Kitt Peak	Spacewatch	·	890 m	MPC · JPL
381002	2006 TG_{78}	—	October 12, 2006	Palomar	NEAT	·	1.1 km	MPC · JPL
381003	2006 TK_{83}	—	October 4, 2006	Mount Lemmon	Mount Lemmon Survey	·	680 m	MPC · JPL
381004	2006 TW_{94}	—	October 15, 2006	Lulin	Lin, C.-S., Q. Ye	·	960 m	MPC · JPL
381005	2006 TX_{129}	—	October 3, 2006	Mount Lemmon	Mount Lemmon Survey	·	750 m	MPC · JPL
381006	2006 UG_{5}	—	October 16, 2006	Goodricke-Pigott	R. A. Tucker	·	770 m	MPC · JPL
381007	2006 UU_{7}	—	October 16, 2006	Catalina	CSS	·	810 m	MPC · JPL
381008	2006 UW_{14}	—	September 30, 2006	Mount Lemmon	Mount Lemmon Survey	·	770 m	MPC · JPL
381009	2006 UR_{46}	—	October 16, 2006	Kitt Peak	Spacewatch	·	960 m	MPC · JPL
381010	2006 UJ_{73}	—	September 26, 2006	Kitt Peak	Spacewatch	·	700 m	MPC · JPL
381011	2006 UG_{94}	—	October 18, 2006	Kitt Peak	Spacewatch	V	530 m	MPC · JPL
381012	2006 UH_{94}	—	October 18, 2006	Kitt Peak	Spacewatch	·	660 m	MPC · JPL
381013	2006 UX_{102}	—	October 18, 2006	Kitt Peak	Spacewatch	·	950 m	MPC · JPL
381014	2006 UX_{138}	—	October 19, 2006	Kitt Peak	Spacewatch	·	820 m	MPC · JPL
381015	2006 UA_{152}	—	October 20, 2006	Mount Lemmon	Mount Lemmon Survey	·	810 m	MPC · JPL
381016	2006 UZ_{166}	—	October 2, 2006	Mount Lemmon	Mount Lemmon Survey	·	760 m	MPC · JPL
381017	2006 UZ_{180}	—	October 16, 2006	Catalina	CSS	·	810 m	MPC · JPL
381018	2006 UF_{191}	—	September 28, 2006	Catalina	CSS	·	700 m	MPC · JPL
381019	2006 UQ_{193}	—	October 20, 2006	Kitt Peak	Spacewatch	·	580 m	MPC · JPL
381020	2006 UE_{204}	—	October 19, 2006	Catalina	CSS	BAP	750 m	MPC · JPL
381021	2006 UA_{210}	—	October 23, 2006	Kitt Peak	Spacewatch	(1338) (FLO)	660 m	MPC · JPL
381022	2006 UV_{212}	—	October 23, 2006	Kitt Peak	Spacewatch	·	1.2 km	MPC · JPL
381023	2006 UB_{225}	—	October 19, 2006	Catalina	CSS	·	1 km	MPC · JPL
381024	2006 UE_{228}	—	October 20, 2006	Mount Lemmon	Mount Lemmon Survey	·	770 m	MPC · JPL
381025	2006 UN_{228}	—	October 20, 2006	Palomar	NEAT	·	760 m	MPC · JPL
381026	2006 UQ_{233}	—	October 22, 2006	Kitt Peak	Spacewatch	·	830 m	MPC · JPL
381027	2006 UW_{238}	—	October 23, 2006	Kitt Peak	Spacewatch	·	800 m	MPC · JPL
381028	2006 UB_{259}	—	October 28, 2006	Mount Lemmon	Mount Lemmon Survey	·	720 m	MPC · JPL
381029	2006 UO_{329}	—	October 23, 2006	Mount Lemmon	Mount Lemmon Survey	·	930 m	MPC · JPL
381030	2006 VX_{7}	—	November 10, 2006	Kitt Peak	Spacewatch	·	1.1 km	MPC · JPL
381031	2006 VJ_{13}	—	October 3, 2006	Mount Lemmon	Mount Lemmon Survey	·	850 m	MPC · JPL
381032	2006 VP_{15}	—	November 9, 2006	Kitt Peak	Spacewatch	·	980 m	MPC · JPL
381033	2006 VB_{17}	—	September 28, 2006	Mount Lemmon	Mount Lemmon Survey	·	710 m	MPC · JPL
381034	2006 VR_{54}	—	November 11, 2006	Kitt Peak	Spacewatch	CYB	4.5 km	MPC · JPL
381035	2006 VU_{59}	—	November 11, 2006	Kitt Peak	Spacewatch	·	1.0 km	MPC · JPL
381036	2006 VD_{63}	—	November 11, 2006	Kitt Peak	Spacewatch	PHO	960 m	MPC · JPL
381037	2006 VO_{84}	—	November 13, 2006	Kitt Peak	Spacewatch	·	870 m	MPC · JPL
381038	2006 VT_{94}	—	October 31, 2006	Mount Lemmon	Mount Lemmon Survey	·	790 m	MPC · JPL
381039	2006 VP_{105}	—	November 13, 2006	Kitt Peak	Spacewatch	·	650 m	MPC · JPL
381040	2006 VJ_{107}	—	October 4, 2006	Mount Lemmon	Mount Lemmon Survey	V	720 m	MPC · JPL
381041	2006 VE_{109}	—	October 23, 2006	Kitt Peak	Spacewatch	·	480 m	MPC · JPL
381042	2006 VP_{118}	—	November 14, 2006	Kitt Peak	Spacewatch	·	760 m	MPC · JPL
381043	2006 VL_{119}	—	November 14, 2006	Mount Lemmon	Mount Lemmon Survey	·	630 m	MPC · JPL
381044	2006 VP_{144}	—	October 2, 2006	Mount Lemmon	Mount Lemmon Survey	·	810 m	MPC · JPL
381045	2006 VJ_{148}	—	November 15, 2006	Mount Lemmon	Mount Lemmon Survey	·	1.3 km	MPC · JPL
381046	2006 VO_{148}	—	November 15, 2006	Mount Lemmon	Mount Lemmon Survey	·	1.2 km	MPC · JPL
381047	2006 VD_{151}	—	October 15, 2006	Lulin	LUSS	·	590 m	MPC · JPL
381048 Werber	2006 WA_{1}	Werber	November 17, 2006	Nogales	J.-C. Merlin	·	710 m	MPC · JPL
381049	2006 WE_{3}	—	November 16, 2006	Catalina	CSS	PHO	650 m	MPC · JPL
381050	2006 WR_{3}	—	November 20, 2006	Catalina	CSS	T_{j} (2.43) · CYB	3.9 km	MPC · JPL
381051	2006 WW_{18}	—	November 17, 2006	Kitt Peak	Spacewatch	·	830 m	MPC · JPL
381052	2006 WW_{22}	—	November 17, 2006	Mount Lemmon	Mount Lemmon Survey	PHO	940 m	MPC · JPL
381053	2006 WA_{23}	—	November 17, 2006	Mount Lemmon	Mount Lemmon Survey	·	1.0 km	MPC · JPL
381054	2006 WQ_{56}	—	November 16, 2006	Kitt Peak	Spacewatch	·	970 m	MPC · JPL
381055	2006 WR_{119}	—	November 21, 2006	Mount Lemmon	Mount Lemmon Survey	·	760 m	MPC · JPL
381056	2006 WC_{170}	—	November 23, 2006	Kitt Peak	Spacewatch	·	730 m	MPC · JPL
381057	2006 WS_{179}	—	November 24, 2006	Mount Lemmon	Mount Lemmon Survey	·	840 m	MPC · JPL
381058	2006 WQ_{195}	—	November 30, 2006	Kitt Peak	Spacewatch	·	1.0 km	MPC · JPL
381059	2006 WP_{202}	—	November 26, 2006	Kitt Peak	Spacewatch	V	630 m	MPC · JPL
381060	2006 XP_{9}	—	December 9, 2006	Kitt Peak	Spacewatch	·	1.1 km	MPC · JPL
381061	2006 XO_{15}	—	December 10, 2006	Kitt Peak	Spacewatch	·	950 m	MPC · JPL
381062	2006 XH_{53}	—	December 14, 2006	Kitt Peak	Spacewatch	·	1.0 km	MPC · JPL
381063	2006 XF_{58}	—	December 14, 2006	Kitt Peak	Spacewatch	3:2	4.4 km	MPC · JPL
381064	2006 XX_{59}	—	November 21, 2006	Mount Lemmon	Mount Lemmon Survey	V	730 m	MPC · JPL
381065	2006 XQ_{60}	—	December 14, 2006	Kitt Peak	Spacewatch	V	690 m	MPC · JPL
381066	2006 YQ_{4}	—	December 16, 2006	Kitt Peak	Spacewatch	·	1.1 km	MPC · JPL
381067	2006 YH_{10}	—	December 21, 2006	Kitt Peak	Spacewatch	V	780 m	MPC · JPL
381068	2006 YP_{23}	—	December 13, 2006	Kitt Peak	Spacewatch	·	980 m	MPC · JPL
381069	2006 YT_{43}	—	December 25, 2006	Anderson Mesa	LONEOS	·	1.0 km	MPC · JPL
381070	2006 YV_{51}	—	December 26, 2006	7300	W. K. Y. Yeung	·	1.1 km	MPC · JPL
381071	2006 YQ_{53}	—	December 26, 2006	Kitt Peak	Spacewatch	·	1.4 km	MPC · JPL
381072	2007 AZ_{3}	—	January 8, 2007	Catalina	CSS	PHO	1.2 km	MPC · JPL
381073	2007 AB_{11}	—	January 9, 2007	Mount Lemmon	Mount Lemmon Survey	PHO	1.1 km	MPC · JPL
381074	2007 AX_{12}	—	November 17, 2006	Kitt Peak	Spacewatch	·	1.5 km	MPC · JPL
381075	2007 AC_{14}	—	January 9, 2007	Mount Lemmon	Mount Lemmon Survey	·	980 m	MPC · JPL
381076	2007 AH_{24}	—	January 10, 2007	Mount Lemmon	Mount Lemmon Survey	·	1.3 km	MPC · JPL
381077	2007 BR_{18}	—	January 17, 2007	Palomar	NEAT	T_{j} (2.99) · HIL · 3:2	6.4 km	MPC · JPL
381078	2007 BQ_{20}	—	January 23, 2007	Anderson Mesa	LONEOS	·	2.9 km	MPC · JPL
381079	2007 BB_{30}	—	January 8, 2007	Kitt Peak	Spacewatch	·	1.3 km	MPC · JPL
381080	2007 BS_{35}	—	January 24, 2007	Socorro	LINEAR	·	1.4 km	MPC · JPL
381081	2007 BV_{35}	—	January 8, 2007	Mount Lemmon	Mount Lemmon Survey	NYS	960 m	MPC · JPL
381082	2007 BV_{36}	—	January 24, 2007	Catalina	CSS	·	850 m	MPC · JPL
381083	2007 BG_{41}	—	January 24, 2007	Mount Lemmon	Mount Lemmon Survey	·	1.1 km	MPC · JPL
381084	2007 BD_{43}	—	January 9, 2007	Mount Lemmon	Mount Lemmon Survey	MAS	690 m	MPC · JPL
381085	2007 BJ_{48}	—	January 26, 2007	Kitt Peak	Spacewatch	NYS	1.1 km	MPC · JPL
381086	2007 BT_{54}	—	January 24, 2007	Socorro	LINEAR	V	790 m	MPC · JPL
381087	2007 BO_{56}	—	January 24, 2007	Socorro	LINEAR	·	1.3 km	MPC · JPL
381088	2007 BY_{56}	—	December 21, 2006	Kitt Peak	Spacewatch	·	1.1 km	MPC · JPL
381089	2007 BD_{57}	—	January 24, 2007	Socorro	LINEAR	NYS	1.1 km	MPC · JPL
381090	2007 BP_{65}	—	January 27, 2007	Mount Lemmon	Mount Lemmon Survey	·	1.6 km	MPC · JPL
381091	2007 BB_{70}	—	January 27, 2007	Mount Lemmon	Mount Lemmon Survey	·	1.5 km	MPC · JPL
381092	2007 BL_{77}	—	January 17, 2007	Kitt Peak	Spacewatch	V	670 m	MPC · JPL
381093	2007 BB_{79}	—	January 27, 2007	Mount Lemmon	Mount Lemmon Survey	MAS	650 m	MPC · JPL
381094	2007 BN_{79}	—	January 27, 2007	Mount Lemmon	Mount Lemmon Survey	MAS	760 m	MPC · JPL
381095	2007 CT_{3}	—	February 6, 2007	Kitt Peak	Spacewatch	NYS	1.3 km	MPC · JPL
381096	2007 CS_{6}	—	November 27, 2006	Mount Lemmon	Mount Lemmon Survey	·	1.4 km	MPC · JPL
381097	2007 CP_{17}	—	February 8, 2007	Mount Lemmon	Mount Lemmon Survey	MAS	660 m	MPC · JPL
381098	2007 CB_{22}	—	February 6, 2007	Mount Lemmon	Mount Lemmon Survey	·	1.3 km	MPC · JPL
381099	2007 CD_{23}	—	January 27, 2007	Kitt Peak	Spacewatch	·	1.0 km	MPC · JPL
381100	2007 CS_{25}	—	December 15, 2006	Kitt Peak	Spacewatch	·	1.0 km	MPC · JPL

== 381101–381200 ==
back to top

Designation			Discovery			Properties		Ref
Permanent	Provisional	Named after	Date	Site	Discoverer(s)	Category	Diam.	Ref
381101	2007 CX_{34}	—	February 6, 2007	Palomar	NEAT	·	1.3 km	MPC · JPL
381102	2007 CA_{44}	—	February 8, 2007	Kitt Peak	Spacewatch	V	990 m	MPC · JPL
381103	2007 CQ_{52}	—	February 10, 2007	Mount Lemmon	Mount Lemmon Survey	·	2.6 km	MPC · JPL
381104	2007 CU_{56}	—	February 15, 2007	Catalina	CSS	·	1.3 km	MPC · JPL
381105	2007 CN_{65}	—	February 10, 2007	Catalina	CSS	·	1.0 km	MPC · JPL
381106	2007 CH_{79}	—	February 15, 2007	Catalina	CSS	·	1.7 km	MPC · JPL
381107	2007 DR_{5}	—	February 17, 2007	Kitt Peak	Spacewatch	·	1.3 km	MPC · JPL
381108	2007 DQ_{6}	—	December 21, 2006	Mount Lemmon	Mount Lemmon Survey	·	1.2 km	MPC · JPL
381109	2007 DP_{8}	—	February 17, 2007	Kitt Peak	Spacewatch	·	1.0 km	MPC · JPL
381110	2007 DE_{12}	—	February 16, 2007	Palomar	NEAT	NYS	1.2 km	MPC · JPL
381111	2007 DH_{14}	—	February 8, 2007	Kitt Peak	Spacewatch	NYS	1.3 km	MPC · JPL
381112	2007 DE_{18}	—	February 17, 2007	Kitt Peak	Spacewatch	·	1.0 km	MPC · JPL
381113	2007 DU_{22}	—	February 17, 2007	Kitt Peak	Spacewatch	·	1.3 km	MPC · JPL
381114	2007 DM_{24}	—	February 17, 2007	Kitt Peak	Spacewatch	·	1.3 km	MPC · JPL
381115	2007 DJ_{28}	—	February 7, 2007	Kitt Peak	Spacewatch	·	1.1 km	MPC · JPL
381116	2007 DQ_{29}	—	February 17, 2007	Kitt Peak	Spacewatch	NYS	930 m	MPC · JPL
381117	2007 DA_{40}	—	February 19, 2007	Kitt Peak	Spacewatch	3:2	5.1 km	MPC · JPL
381118	2007 DL_{42}	—	February 17, 2007	Kitt Peak	Spacewatch	·	1.2 km	MPC · JPL
381119	2007 DJ_{49}	—	February 22, 2007	Gaisberg	Gierlinger, R.	·	1.4 km	MPC · JPL
381120	2007 DY_{54}	—	January 13, 1996	Kitt Peak	Spacewatch	NYS	840 m	MPC · JPL
381121	2007 DP_{60}	—	February 22, 2007	Anderson Mesa	LONEOS	NYS	1.2 km	MPC · JPL
381122	2007 DL_{67}	—	February 21, 2007	Kitt Peak	Spacewatch	NYS	1.1 km	MPC · JPL
381123	2007 DJ_{84}	—	February 25, 2007	Catalina	CSS	PHO	1.1 km	MPC · JPL
381124	2007 DE_{91}	—	January 27, 2007	Mount Lemmon	Mount Lemmon Survey	MAS	630 m	MPC · JPL
381125	2007 DK_{106}	—	February 27, 2007	Kitt Peak	Spacewatch	·	2.4 km	MPC · JPL
381126	2007 DZ_{108}	—	February 23, 2007	Kitt Peak	Spacewatch	NYS	1.3 km	MPC · JPL
381127	2007 DQ_{111}	—	February 25, 2007	Mount Lemmon	Mount Lemmon Survey	EUN	1.6 km	MPC · JPL
381128	2007 EV_{13}	—	March 9, 2007	Kitt Peak	Spacewatch	NYS	1.1 km	MPC · JPL
381129	2007 EL_{18}	—	March 9, 2007	Palomar	NEAT	NYS	1.4 km	MPC · JPL
381130	2007 EN_{23}	—	March 10, 2007	Mount Lemmon	Mount Lemmon Survey	·	2.0 km	MPC · JPL
381131	2007 EH_{32}	—	March 10, 2007	Kitt Peak	Spacewatch	·	1.4 km	MPC · JPL
381132	2007 EG_{34}	—	March 10, 2007	Kitt Peak	Spacewatch	·	1.3 km	MPC · JPL
381133	2007 ER_{48}	—	March 9, 2007	Kitt Peak	Spacewatch	EUN	1.3 km	MPC · JPL
381134	2007 EW_{72}	—	March 10, 2007	Kitt Peak	Spacewatch	·	1.1 km	MPC · JPL
381135	2007 ED_{99}	—	February 25, 2007	Mount Lemmon	Mount Lemmon Survey	MAS	960 m	MPC · JPL
381136	2007 EW_{118}	—	March 13, 2007	Mount Lemmon	Mount Lemmon Survey	(5)	1.6 km	MPC · JPL
381137	2007 EO_{128}	—	March 9, 2007	Mount Lemmon	Mount Lemmon Survey	NYS	1.2 km	MPC · JPL
381138	2007 EH_{144}	—	March 12, 2007	Mount Lemmon	Mount Lemmon Survey	·	1.3 km	MPC · JPL
381139	2007 EL_{151}	—	March 12, 2007	Mount Lemmon	Mount Lemmon Survey	·	1.4 km	MPC · JPL
381140	2007 EB_{187}	—	February 23, 2007	Kitt Peak	Spacewatch	(5)	1.5 km	MPC · JPL
381141	2007 EJ_{191}	—	March 13, 2007	Kitt Peak	Spacewatch	·	2.4 km	MPC · JPL
381142	2007 EL_{195}	—	March 15, 2007	Kitt Peak	Spacewatch	·	1.2 km	MPC · JPL
381143	2007 EO_{198}	—	March 14, 2007	Catalina	CSS	T_{j} (2.96)	5.2 km	MPC · JPL
381144	2007 EU_{219}	—	March 11, 2007	Mount Lemmon	Mount Lemmon Survey	L5 · (17492)	10 km	MPC · JPL
381145	2007 FX_{5}	—	February 26, 2007	Mount Lemmon	Mount Lemmon Survey	NYS	980 m	MPC · JPL
381146	2007 FD_{33}	—	March 20, 2007	Purple Mountain	PMO NEO Survey Program	·	2.0 km	MPC · JPL
381147	2007 GX_{1}	—	April 10, 2007	Purple Mountain	PMO NEO Survey Program	·	1.7 km	MPC · JPL
381148	2007 GZ_{1}	—	April 8, 2007	Gaisberg	Gierlinger, R.	L5	12 km	MPC · JPL
381149	2007 GN_{5}	—	April 14, 2007	Bergisch Gladbach	W. Bickel	·	2.7 km	MPC · JPL
381150	2007 GU_{11}	—	March 11, 2007	Kitt Peak	Spacewatch	·	1.3 km	MPC · JPL
381151	2007 GZ_{11}	—	April 11, 2007	Kitt Peak	Spacewatch	·	1.8 km	MPC · JPL
381152	2007 GC_{21}	—	April 11, 2007	Mount Lemmon	Mount Lemmon Survey	·	1.6 km	MPC · JPL
381153	2007 GR_{21}	—	April 11, 2007	Mount Lemmon	Mount Lemmon Survey	·	2.0 km	MPC · JPL
381154	2007 GK_{23}	—	April 11, 2007	Kitt Peak	Spacewatch	NYS ·	2.3 km	MPC · JPL
381155	2007 GN_{24}	—	April 11, 2007	Kitt Peak	Spacewatch	·	2.2 km	MPC · JPL
381156	2007 GW_{30}	—	April 14, 2007	Mount Lemmon	Mount Lemmon Survey	EUN	1.7 km	MPC · JPL
381157	2007 GE_{39}	—	April 14, 2007	Kitt Peak	Spacewatch	·	1.1 km	MPC · JPL
381158	2007 GP_{40}	—	April 14, 2007	Kitt Peak	Spacewatch	·	2.0 km	MPC · JPL
381159	2007 GQ_{56}	—	April 15, 2007	Kitt Peak	Spacewatch	·	1.1 km	MPC · JPL
381160	2007 GH_{71}	—	March 11, 2007	Anderson Mesa	LONEOS	·	1.3 km	MPC · JPL
381161	2007 GP_{73}	—	April 15, 2007	Catalina	CSS	EUN	1.7 km	MPC · JPL
381162	2007 HQ_{18}	—	April 16, 2007	Mount Lemmon	Mount Lemmon Survey	(13314)	2.1 km	MPC · JPL
381163	2007 HF_{40}	—	April 20, 2007	Mount Lemmon	Mount Lemmon Survey	·	2.1 km	MPC · JPL
381164	2007 HN_{50}	—	April 20, 2007	Kitt Peak	Spacewatch	·	1.4 km	MPC · JPL
381165	2007 HH_{65}	—	April 15, 2007	Catalina	CSS	·	2.5 km	MPC · JPL
381166	2007 HY_{72}	—	April 22, 2007	Kitt Peak	Spacewatch	·	1.7 km	MPC · JPL
381167	2007 HV_{76}	—	April 23, 2007	Kitt Peak	Spacewatch	PHO	1.3 km	MPC · JPL
381168	2007 HC_{88}	—	April 19, 2007	Anderson Mesa	LONEOS	·	1.5 km	MPC · JPL
381169	2007 HM_{90}	—	April 23, 2007	Catalina	CSS	·	2.7 km	MPC · JPL
381170	2007 HH_{95}	—	April 25, 2007	Kitt Peak	Spacewatch	·	3.4 km	MPC · JPL
381171	2007 HY_{97}	—	April 25, 2007	Mount Lemmon	Mount Lemmon Survey	·	3.0 km	MPC · JPL
381172	2007 JW	—	March 11, 2007	Mount Lemmon	Mount Lemmon Survey	·	1.7 km	MPC · JPL
381173	2007 JU_{4}	—	May 7, 2007	Kitt Peak	Spacewatch	·	2.1 km	MPC · JPL
381174	2007 JT_{6}	—	May 9, 2007	Mount Lemmon	Mount Lemmon Survey	(13314)	1.9 km	MPC · JPL
381175	2007 JX_{9}	—	May 10, 2007	Calvin-Rehoboth	L. A. Molnar	·	1.6 km	MPC · JPL
381176	2007 JG_{14}	—	April 25, 2007	Kitt Peak	Spacewatch	·	1.9 km	MPC · JPL
381177	2007 JG_{20}	—	May 11, 2007	Mount Lemmon	Mount Lemmon Survey	·	1.5 km	MPC · JPL
381178	2007 JM_{28}	—	May 10, 2007	Anderson Mesa	LONEOS	·	1.7 km	MPC · JPL
381179	2007 JU_{30}	—	May 11, 2007	Mount Lemmon	Mount Lemmon Survey	H	520 m	MPC · JPL
381180	2007 LF_{13}	—	June 10, 2007	Kitt Peak	Spacewatch	·	1.8 km	MPC · JPL
381181	2007 LV_{19}	—	June 15, 2007	Siding Spring	SSS	APO	600 m	MPC · JPL
381182	2007 LX_{20}	—	June 11, 2007	Kitt Peak	Spacewatch	H	590 m	MPC · JPL
381183	2007 LN_{21}	—	June 12, 2007	Kitt Peak	Spacewatch	·	1.6 km	MPC · JPL
381184	2007 LR_{21}	—	June 12, 2007	Kitt Peak	Spacewatch	MAR	1.1 km	MPC · JPL
381185	2007 LQ_{28}	—	November 4, 2004	Kitt Peak	Spacewatch	·	2.6 km	MPC · JPL
381186	2007 MP_{13}	—	April 22, 2007	Catalina	CSS	RAF	1.1 km	MPC · JPL
381187	2007 NN_{6}	—	July 10, 2007	Siding Spring	SSS	·	2.0 km	MPC · JPL
381188	2007 OK_{6}	—	July 20, 2007	Reedy Creek	J. Broughton	NYS	1.1 km	MPC · JPL
381189	2007 OD_{11}	—	July 19, 2007	Mount Lemmon	Mount Lemmon Survey	URS	3.7 km	MPC · JPL
381190	2007 PO_{24}	—	August 12, 2007	Socorro	LINEAR	TIR	4.3 km	MPC · JPL
381191	2007 PN_{46}	—	August 10, 2007	Kitt Peak	Spacewatch	EOS	2.2 km	MPC · JPL
381192	2007 PX_{49}	—	August 10, 2007	Kitt Peak	Spacewatch	·	2.0 km	MPC · JPL
381193	2007 QP_{15}	—	August 24, 2007	Kitt Peak	Spacewatch	EOS	1.9 km	MPC · JPL
381194	2007 RQ_{9}	—	June 5, 2007	Catalina	CSS	BAR	2.1 km	MPC · JPL
381195	2007 RH_{13}	—	September 3, 2007	Catalina	CSS	·	3.1 km	MPC · JPL
381196	2007 RM_{26}	—	September 27, 2003	Kitt Peak	Spacewatch	·	2.3 km	MPC · JPL
381197	2007 RS_{31}	—	June 12, 2007	Catalina	CSS	·	3.9 km	MPC · JPL
381198	2007 RG_{35}	—	September 7, 2007	Bergisch Gladbach	W. Bickel	·	2.7 km	MPC · JPL
381199	2007 RT_{45}	—	September 9, 2007	Kitt Peak	Spacewatch	·	2.2 km	MPC · JPL
381200	2007 RD_{49}	—	September 9, 2007	Mount Lemmon	Mount Lemmon Survey	·	3.6 km	MPC · JPL

== 381201–381300 ==
back to top

Designation			Discovery			Properties		Ref
Permanent	Provisional	Named after	Date	Site	Discoverer(s)	Category	Diam.	Ref
381201	2007 RF_{57}	—	September 9, 2007	Kitt Peak	Spacewatch	·	3.2 km	MPC · JPL
381202	2007 RL_{58}	—	September 9, 2007	Kitt Peak	Spacewatch	·	3.6 km	MPC · JPL
381203	2007 RF_{70}	—	September 10, 2007	Kitt Peak	Spacewatch	THM	2.3 km	MPC · JPL
381204	2007 RR_{70}	—	September 10, 2007	Kitt Peak	Spacewatch	THM	1.7 km	MPC · JPL
381205	2007 RK_{94}	—	September 10, 2007	Kitt Peak	Spacewatch	·	2.5 km	MPC · JPL
381206	2007 RD_{102}	—	September 11, 2007	Catalina	CSS	TIR	2.6 km	MPC · JPL
381207	2007 RF_{110}	—	September 11, 2007	Mount Lemmon	Mount Lemmon Survey	·	1.7 km	MPC · JPL
381208	2007 RT_{125}	—	September 12, 2007	Catalina	CSS	·	2.9 km	MPC · JPL
381209	2007 RG_{130}	—	September 12, 2007	Mount Lemmon	Mount Lemmon Survey	·	3.2 km	MPC · JPL
381210	2007 RN_{149}	—	September 12, 2007	Catalina	CSS	·	3.2 km	MPC · JPL
381211	2007 RO_{160}	—	September 12, 2007	Mount Lemmon	Mount Lemmon Survey	HYG	2.5 km	MPC · JPL
381212	2007 RM_{167}	—	August 24, 2007	Kitt Peak	Spacewatch	·	2.8 km	MPC · JPL
381213	2007 RV_{173}	—	September 10, 2007	Kitt Peak	Spacewatch	·	2.9 km	MPC · JPL
381214	2007 RM_{193}	—	September 12, 2007	Kitt Peak	Spacewatch	·	2.7 km	MPC · JPL
381215	2007 RW_{198}	—	September 13, 2007	Catalina	CSS	·	3.8 km	MPC · JPL
381216	2007 RR_{206}	—	September 10, 2007	Kitt Peak	Spacewatch	·	1.8 km	MPC · JPL
381217	2007 RM_{211}	—	August 21, 2007	Anderson Mesa	LONEOS	·	2.2 km	MPC · JPL
381218	2007 RZ_{212}	—	September 12, 2007	Catalina	CSS	·	2.8 km	MPC · JPL
381219	2007 RL_{222}	—	September 14, 2007	Mount Lemmon	Mount Lemmon Survey	·	2.3 km	MPC · JPL
381220	2007 RN_{232}	—	September 11, 2007	Mount Lemmon	Mount Lemmon Survey	·	3.4 km	MPC · JPL
381221	2007 RD_{247}	—	September 12, 2007	Catalina	CSS	EOS	2.3 km	MPC · JPL
381222	2007 RR_{268}	—	September 15, 2007	Kitt Peak	Spacewatch	·	3.4 km	MPC · JPL
381223	2007 RX_{271}	—	September 15, 2007	Kitt Peak	Spacewatch	·	2.3 km	MPC · JPL
381224	2007 RZ_{278}	—	September 5, 2007	Siding Spring	SSS	·	4.7 km	MPC · JPL
381225	2007 RO_{291}	—	September 12, 2007	Kitt Peak	Spacewatch	THM	2.0 km	MPC · JPL
381226	2007 RV_{293}	—	September 13, 2007	Mount Lemmon	Mount Lemmon Survey	·	2.4 km	MPC · JPL
381227	2007 RX_{294}	—	September 14, 2007	Mount Lemmon	Mount Lemmon Survey	·	2.0 km	MPC · JPL
381228	2007 RY_{310}	—	September 14, 2007	Catalina	CSS	·	4.0 km	MPC · JPL
381229	2007 SM_{3}	—	September 16, 2007	Socorro	LINEAR	·	3.4 km	MPC · JPL
381230	2007 SJ_{15}	—	September 25, 2007	Mount Lemmon	Mount Lemmon Survey	EOS	2.1 km	MPC · JPL
381231	2007 ST_{23}	—	September 26, 2007	Mount Lemmon	Mount Lemmon Survey	·	3.7 km	MPC · JPL
381232	2007 TD_{6}	—	October 6, 2007	La Sagra	OAM	·	5.8 km	MPC · JPL
381233	2007 TM_{10}	—	October 6, 2007	Socorro	LINEAR	·	3.1 km	MPC · JPL
381234	2007 TT_{11}	—	October 6, 2007	Socorro	LINEAR	·	4.9 km	MPC · JPL
381235	2007 TJ_{14}	—	October 7, 2007	Altschwendt	W. Ries	·	2.8 km	MPC · JPL
381236	2007 TC_{33}	—	October 6, 2007	Kitt Peak	Spacewatch	·	3.1 km	MPC · JPL
381237	2007 TJ_{37}	—	October 4, 2007	Catalina	CSS	·	3.4 km	MPC · JPL
381238	2007 TK_{42}	—	October 7, 2007	Mount Lemmon	Mount Lemmon Survey	·	2.0 km	MPC · JPL
381239	2007 TJ_{43}	—	October 7, 2007	Mount Lemmon	Mount Lemmon Survey	EOS	2.1 km	MPC · JPL
381240	2007 TR_{43}	—	October 7, 2007	Kitt Peak	Spacewatch	·	3.3 km	MPC · JPL
381241	2007 TE_{44}	—	October 7, 2007	Kitt Peak	Spacewatch	TIR	3.4 km	MPC · JPL
381242	2007 TP_{56}	—	September 9, 2007	Mount Lemmon	Mount Lemmon Survey	EOS	2.1 km	MPC · JPL
381243	2007 TD_{63}	—	October 7, 2007	Mount Lemmon	Mount Lemmon Survey	·	2.4 km	MPC · JPL
381244	2007 TQ_{65}	—	October 9, 2007	Needville	J. Dellinger, T. E. Rabben	·	2.7 km	MPC · JPL
381245	2007 TA_{69}	—	October 7, 2007	Saint-Sulpice	B. Christophe	·	3.0 km	MPC · JPL
381246	2007 TU_{76}	—	October 5, 2007	Kitt Peak	Spacewatch	·	2.1 km	MPC · JPL
381247	2007 TZ_{76}	—	October 5, 2007	Kitt Peak	Spacewatch	EOS	2.6 km	MPC · JPL
381248	2007 TF_{94}	—	September 12, 2007	Catalina	CSS	TIR	3.4 km	MPC · JPL
381249	2007 TD_{105}	—	October 13, 2007	Calvin-Rehoboth	Calvin College	·	4.0 km	MPC · JPL
381250	2007 TR_{106}	—	October 4, 2007	Kitt Peak	Spacewatch	·	3.1 km	MPC · JPL
381251	2007 TG_{120}	—	October 9, 2007	7300	W. K. Y. Yeung	·	4.5 km	MPC · JPL
381252	2007 TK_{124}	—	October 6, 2007	Kitt Peak	Spacewatch	·	5.8 km	MPC · JPL
381253	2007 TX_{125}	—	October 6, 2007	Kitt Peak	Spacewatch	THM	2.2 km	MPC · JPL
381254	2007 TU_{129}	—	October 6, 2007	Kitt Peak	Spacewatch	HYG	2.9 km	MPC · JPL
381255	2007 TQ_{138}	—	October 9, 2007	Catalina	CSS	TIR	3.7 km	MPC · JPL
381256	2007 TN_{153}	—	October 9, 2007	Socorro	LINEAR	·	3.3 km	MPC · JPL
381257	2007 TF_{156}	—	October 9, 2007	Socorro	LINEAR	LIX	3.6 km	MPC · JPL
381258	2007 TR_{159}	—	September 25, 2007	Mount Lemmon	Mount Lemmon Survey	TIR	3.0 km	MPC · JPL
381259	2007 TL_{162}	—	October 11, 2007	Catalina	CSS	·	3.6 km	MPC · JPL
381260 Ouellette	2007 TD_{166}	Ouellette	October 11, 2007	Mauna Kea	D. D. Balam	EOS	2.4 km	MPC · JPL
381261	2007 TK_{176}	—	October 5, 2007	Kitt Peak	Spacewatch	·	4.6 km	MPC · JPL
381262	2007 TX_{178}	—	September 25, 2007	Mount Lemmon	Mount Lemmon Survey	·	3.8 km	MPC · JPL
381263	2007 TZ_{178}	—	October 9, 2007	Mount Lemmon	Mount Lemmon Survey	THM	2.3 km	MPC · JPL
381264	2007 TY_{189}	—	October 4, 2007	Mount Lemmon	Mount Lemmon Survey	EOS	2.0 km	MPC · JPL
381265	2007 TK_{194}	—	October 7, 2007	Mount Lemmon	Mount Lemmon Survey	HYG	2.9 km	MPC · JPL
381266	2007 TK_{203}	—	October 8, 2007	Mount Lemmon	Mount Lemmon Survey	·	2.6 km	MPC · JPL
381267	2007 TS_{204}	—	October 8, 2007	Mount Lemmon	Mount Lemmon Survey	·	3.1 km	MPC · JPL
381268	2007 TL_{213}	—	September 25, 2007	Mount Lemmon	Mount Lemmon Survey	EMA	3.2 km	MPC · JPL
381269	2007 TS_{226}	—	October 8, 2007	Kitt Peak	Spacewatch	T_{j} (2.99) · EUP	3.8 km	MPC · JPL
381270	2007 TO_{228}	—	October 8, 2007	Kitt Peak	Spacewatch	·	3.3 km	MPC · JPL
381271	2007 TK_{231}	—	October 8, 2007	Mount Lemmon	Mount Lemmon Survey	·	3.3 km	MPC · JPL
381272	2007 TD_{236}	—	October 9, 2007	Mount Lemmon	Mount Lemmon Survey	·	2.4 km	MPC · JPL
381273	2007 TX_{245}	—	October 9, 2007	Catalina	CSS	·	3.3 km	MPC · JPL
381274	2007 TO_{257}	—	October 10, 2007	Kitt Peak	Spacewatch	·	2.5 km	MPC · JPL
381275	2007 TH_{282}	—	October 8, 2007	Mount Lemmon	Mount Lemmon Survey	EOS	1.9 km	MPC · JPL
381276	2007 TL_{287}	—	October 11, 2007	Catalina	CSS	·	4.1 km	MPC · JPL
381277	2007 TP_{290}	—	October 12, 2007	Mount Lemmon	Mount Lemmon Survey	·	5.0 km	MPC · JPL
381278	2007 TJ_{304}	—	October 12, 2007	Mount Lemmon	Mount Lemmon Survey	·	3.5 km	MPC · JPL
381279	2007 TR_{317}	—	October 12, 2007	Kitt Peak	Spacewatch	·	3.0 km	MPC · JPL
381280	2007 TM_{328}	—	October 11, 2007	Kitt Peak	Spacewatch	·	2.8 km	MPC · JPL
381281	2007 TS_{337}	—	October 13, 2007	Catalina	CSS	·	1.9 km	MPC · JPL
381282	2007 TU_{355}	—	October 11, 2007	Catalina	CSS	·	3.5 km	MPC · JPL
381283	2007 TL_{380}	—	October 14, 2007	Mount Lemmon	Mount Lemmon Survey	·	3.3 km	MPC · JPL
381284	2007 TW_{399}	—	October 15, 2007	Kitt Peak	Spacewatch	EOS	1.9 km	MPC · JPL
381285	2007 TO_{414}	—	October 15, 2007	Catalina	CSS	·	2.7 km	MPC · JPL
381286	2007 TS_{420}	—	October 10, 2007	Catalina	CSS	·	4.2 km	MPC · JPL
381287	2007 TO_{422}	—	October 8, 2007	Kitt Peak	Spacewatch	·	4.8 km	MPC · JPL
381288	2007 TR_{423}	—	October 6, 2007	Kitt Peak	Spacewatch	·	5.0 km	MPC · JPL
381289	2007 TV_{427}	—	October 10, 2007	Catalina	CSS	TIR	4.0 km	MPC · JPL
381290	2007 TS_{441}	—	October 8, 2007	Catalina	CSS	(5651)	3.4 km	MPC · JPL
381291	2007 TZ_{441}	—	October 9, 2007	Mount Lemmon	Mount Lemmon Survey	·	4.4 km	MPC · JPL
381292	2007 TL_{448}	—	October 8, 2007	Catalina	CSS	·	3.7 km	MPC · JPL
381293	2007 TM_{450}	—	October 12, 2007	Catalina	CSS	·	3.4 km	MPC · JPL
381294	2007 UL_{1}	—	October 16, 2007	Bisei SG Center	BATTeRS	·	3.2 km	MPC · JPL
381295	2007 UY_{17}	—	October 16, 2007	Catalina	CSS	·	3.8 km	MPC · JPL
381296	2007 UO_{25}	—	October 16, 2007	Kitt Peak	Spacewatch	·	5.3 km	MPC · JPL
381297	2007 UE_{33}	—	October 16, 2007	Catalina	CSS	·	4.1 km	MPC · JPL
381298	2007 UL_{33}	—	October 16, 2007	Catalina	CSS	·	3.4 km	MPC · JPL
381299	2007 UG_{39}	—	October 13, 2007	Kitt Peak	Spacewatch	·	3.0 km	MPC · JPL
381300	2007 UK_{46}	—	October 20, 2007	Catalina	CSS	·	2.9 km	MPC · JPL

== 381301–381400 ==
back to top

Designation			Discovery			Properties		Ref
Permanent	Provisional	Named after	Date	Site	Discoverer(s)	Category	Diam.	Ref
381301	2007 UQ_{53}	—	October 30, 2007	Kitt Peak	Spacewatch	·	3.4 km	MPC · JPL
381302	2007 UX_{86}	—	October 30, 2007	Kitt Peak	Spacewatch	·	4.0 km	MPC · JPL
381303	2007 UU_{106}	—	October 31, 2007	Mount Lemmon	Mount Lemmon Survey	·	4.5 km	MPC · JPL
381304	2007 VZ_{3}	—	November 2, 2007	Dauban	Chante-Perdrix	·	2.7 km	MPC · JPL
381305	2007 VT_{17}	—	November 1, 2007	Mount Lemmon	Mount Lemmon Survey	·	2.6 km	MPC · JPL
381306	2007 VX_{30}	—	September 25, 2007	Mount Lemmon	Mount Lemmon Survey	LIX	3.9 km	MPC · JPL
381307	2007 VB_{38}	—	November 2, 2007	Mount Lemmon	Mount Lemmon Survey	·	3.2 km	MPC · JPL
381308	2007 VV_{43}	—	November 1, 2007	Kitt Peak	Spacewatch	·	4.7 km	MPC · JPL
381309	2007 VH_{56}	—	November 1, 2007	Kitt Peak	Spacewatch	·	3.3 km	MPC · JPL
381310	2007 VJ_{90}	—	November 4, 2007	Socorro	LINEAR	·	5.3 km	MPC · JPL
381311	2007 VG_{93}	—	November 3, 2007	Socorro	LINEAR	·	3.7 km	MPC · JPL
381312	2007 VW_{103}	—	October 10, 2007	Kitt Peak	Spacewatch	·	3.7 km	MPC · JPL
381313	2007 VO_{118}	—	November 4, 2007	Mount Lemmon	Mount Lemmon Survey	EOS	2.3 km	MPC · JPL
381314	2007 VP_{141}	—	November 4, 2007	Kitt Peak	Spacewatch	·	2.9 km	MPC · JPL
381315	2007 VH_{169}	—	November 5, 2007	Kitt Peak	Spacewatch	·	2.7 km	MPC · JPL
381316	2007 VU_{177}	—	November 7, 2007	Mount Lemmon	Mount Lemmon Survey	·	2.2 km	MPC · JPL
381317	2007 VE_{204}	—	November 9, 2007	Kitt Peak	Spacewatch	·	4.4 km	MPC · JPL
381318	2007 VX_{213}	—	November 9, 2007	Kitt Peak	Spacewatch	·	3.8 km	MPC · JPL
381319	2007 VM_{223}	—	November 7, 2007	Catalina	CSS	·	4.5 km	MPC · JPL
381320	2007 VQ_{226}	—	November 9, 2007	Mount Lemmon	Mount Lemmon Survey	·	3.3 km	MPC · JPL
381321	2007 VU_{228}	—	November 7, 2007	Kitt Peak	Spacewatch	·	3.5 km	MPC · JPL
381322	2007 VA_{251}	—	November 9, 2007	Catalina	CSS	·	4.4 km	MPC · JPL
381323 Fanjinshi	2007 VV_{252}	Fanjinshi	October 9, 2007	XuYi	PMO NEO Survey Program	·	4.7 km	MPC · JPL
381324	2007 VM_{265}	—	November 13, 2007	Kitt Peak	Spacewatch	·	2.7 km	MPC · JPL
381325	2007 VT_{270}	—	November 15, 2007	Mount Lemmon	Mount Lemmon Survey	EMA	3.8 km	MPC · JPL
381326	2007 VN_{276}	—	November 2, 2007	Kitt Peak	Spacewatch	·	3.7 km	MPC · JPL
381327	2007 VQ_{279}	—	November 14, 2007	Kitt Peak	Spacewatch	·	5.0 km	MPC · JPL
381328	2007 VW_{287}	—	November 12, 2007	Mount Lemmon	Mount Lemmon Survey	·	4.3 km	MPC · JPL
381329	2007 VC_{303}	—	November 3, 2007	Catalina	CSS	T_{j} (2.96)	4.9 km	MPC · JPL
381330	2007 VO_{323}	—	November 4, 2007	Mount Lemmon	Mount Lemmon Survey	EOS	2.6 km	MPC · JPL
381331	2007 VS_{327}	—	November 8, 2007	Catalina	CSS	·	4.1 km	MPC · JPL
381332	2007 WN_{63}	—	November 21, 2007	Catalina	CSS	·	3.6 km	MPC · JPL
381333	2007 XK_{13}	—	December 4, 2007	Catalina	CSS	·	4.0 km	MPC · JPL
381334	2007 XN_{56}	—	December 3, 2007	Socorro	LINEAR	EUP	5.1 km	MPC · JPL
381335	2007 YE_{33}	—	December 28, 2007	Kitt Peak	Spacewatch	CYB	2.8 km	MPC · JPL
381336	2008 AN_{61}	—	January 11, 2008	Kitt Peak	Spacewatch	·	770 m	MPC · JPL
381337	2008 AJ_{106}	—	January 15, 2008	Mount Lemmon	Mount Lemmon Survey	·	1.5 km	MPC · JPL
381338	2008 BP_{30}	—	January 30, 2008	Mount Lemmon	Mount Lemmon Survey	·	850 m	MPC · JPL
381339	2008 BQ_{46}	—	January 30, 2008	Mount Lemmon	Mount Lemmon Survey	·	610 m	MPC · JPL
381340	2008 BZ_{47}	—	January 16, 2008	Kitt Peak	Spacewatch	CYB	4.5 km	MPC · JPL
381341	2008 CU_{13}	—	March 10, 2005	Kitt Peak	Spacewatch	·	720 m	MPC · JPL
381342	2008 CH_{17}	—	February 3, 2008	Kitt Peak	Spacewatch	·	950 m	MPC · JPL
381343	2008 CG_{25}	—	February 1, 2008	Kitt Peak	Spacewatch	·	730 m	MPC · JPL
381344	2008 CM_{49}	—	January 11, 2008	Kitt Peak	Spacewatch	·	770 m	MPC · JPL
381345	2008 CW_{69}	—	February 8, 2008	Dauban	Kugel, F.	·	810 m	MPC · JPL
381346	2008 CY_{102}	—	February 9, 2008	Mount Lemmon	Mount Lemmon Survey	·	710 m	MPC · JPL
381347	2008 CH_{122}	—	February 7, 2008	Kitt Peak	Spacewatch	·	850 m	MPC · JPL
381348	2008 CC_{133}	—	February 8, 2008	Kitt Peak	Spacewatch	·	750 m	MPC · JPL
381349	2008 CK_{133}	—	February 8, 2008	Kitt Peak	Spacewatch	·	580 m	MPC · JPL
381350	2008 CV_{159}	—	February 9, 2008	Kitt Peak	Spacewatch	·	1.0 km	MPC · JPL
381351	2008 CE_{175}	—	February 6, 2008	Socorro	LINEAR	·	6.8 km	MPC · JPL
381352	2008 CR_{192}	—	February 3, 2008	Kitt Peak	Spacewatch	·	820 m	MPC · JPL
381353	2008 CY_{211}	—	February 7, 2008	Kitt Peak	Spacewatch	·	720 m	MPC · JPL
381354	2008 CC_{215}	—	February 12, 2008	Mount Lemmon	Mount Lemmon Survey	·	710 m	MPC · JPL
381355	2008 DU_{15}	—	February 27, 2008	Kitt Peak	Spacewatch	·	750 m	MPC · JPL
381356	2008 DS_{19}	—	February 27, 2008	Mount Lemmon	Mount Lemmon Survey	·	1.0 km	MPC · JPL
381357	2008 DP_{31}	—	February 27, 2008	Kitt Peak	Spacewatch	·	890 m	MPC · JPL
381358	2008 DA_{58}	—	February 28, 2008	Catalina	CSS	·	5.9 km	MPC · JPL
381359	2008 DP_{58}	—	February 26, 2008	Kitt Peak	Spacewatch	·	660 m	MPC · JPL
381360	2008 DV_{78}	—	February 28, 2008	Lulin	LUSS	·	960 m	MPC · JPL
381361	2008 DH_{88}	—	February 18, 2008	Mount Lemmon	Mount Lemmon Survey	·	860 m	MPC · JPL
381362	2008 EP_{15}	—	March 1, 2008	Kitt Peak	Spacewatch	·	570 m	MPC · JPL
381363	2008 EZ_{21}	—	March 2, 2008	Kitt Peak	Spacewatch	·	780 m	MPC · JPL
381364	2008 EB_{24}	—	March 3, 2008	Mount Lemmon	Mount Lemmon Survey	·	910 m	MPC · JPL
381365	2008 EA_{38}	—	March 4, 2008	Kitt Peak	Spacewatch	·	840 m	MPC · JPL
381366	2008 EK_{71}	—	February 9, 2008	Kitt Peak	Spacewatch	·	730 m	MPC · JPL
381367	2008 EM_{79}	—	March 8, 2008	Mount Lemmon	Mount Lemmon Survey	·	660 m	MPC · JPL
381368	2008 EZ_{88}	—	March 8, 2008	Socorro	LINEAR	V	800 m	MPC · JPL
381369	2008 EQ_{111}	—	February 10, 2008	Kitt Peak	Spacewatch	·	990 m	MPC · JPL
381370	2008 EY_{116}	—	March 8, 2008	Kitt Peak	Spacewatch	·	680 m	MPC · JPL
381371	2008 EF_{146}	—	March 11, 2008	Mount Lemmon	Mount Lemmon Survey	·	860 m	MPC · JPL
381372	2008 EZ_{157}	—	March 1, 2008	Kitt Peak	Spacewatch	3:2	4.7 km	MPC · JPL
381373	2008 FK_{23}	—	March 27, 2008	Kitt Peak	Spacewatch	·	720 m	MPC · JPL
381374	2008 FO_{33}	—	March 28, 2008	Mount Lemmon	Mount Lemmon Survey	·	830 m	MPC · JPL
381375	2008 FE_{39}	—	March 28, 2008	Kitt Peak	Spacewatch	·	2.4 km	MPC · JPL
381376	2008 FG_{40}	—	March 28, 2008	Kitt Peak	Spacewatch	·	1 km	MPC · JPL
381377	2008 FE_{55}	—	March 28, 2008	Mount Lemmon	Mount Lemmon Survey	·	870 m	MPC · JPL
381378	2008 FC_{72}	—	March 30, 2008	Kitt Peak	Spacewatch	·	760 m	MPC · JPL
381379	2008 FH_{101}	—	March 30, 2008	Kitt Peak	Spacewatch	·	760 m	MPC · JPL
381380	2008 FA_{109}	—	March 31, 2008	Mount Lemmon	Mount Lemmon Survey	·	580 m	MPC · JPL
381381	2008 FB_{119}	—	March 31, 2008	Mount Lemmon	Mount Lemmon Survey	·	810 m	MPC · JPL
381382	2008 FM_{124}	—	March 30, 2008	Kitt Peak	Spacewatch	MAS	850 m	MPC · JPL
381383	2008 FO_{131}	—	March 26, 2008	Mount Lemmon	Mount Lemmon Survey	·	760 m	MPC · JPL
381384	2008 FH_{135}	—	March 31, 2008	Kitt Peak	Spacewatch	L5	8.3 km	MPC · JPL
381385	2008 GZ_{1}	—	April 5, 2008	Socorro	LINEAR	·	890 m	MPC · JPL
381386	2008 GK_{28}	—	April 3, 2008	Kitt Peak	Spacewatch	·	1.2 km	MPC · JPL
381387	2008 GW_{31}	—	April 3, 2008	Kitt Peak	Spacewatch	·	880 m	MPC · JPL
381388	2008 GR_{32}	—	April 3, 2008	Kitt Peak	Spacewatch	·	1.3 km	MPC · JPL
381389	2008 GD_{34}	—	April 3, 2008	Mount Lemmon	Mount Lemmon Survey	MAS	680 m	MPC · JPL
381390	2008 GP_{40}	—	April 4, 2008	Kitt Peak	Spacewatch	·	790 m	MPC · JPL
381391	2008 GW_{40}	—	March 26, 2008	Kitt Peak	Spacewatch	PHO	1.2 km	MPC · JPL
381392	2008 GN_{42}	—	April 4, 2008	Kitt Peak	Spacewatch	·	1.3 km	MPC · JPL
381393	2008 GQ_{54}	—	April 5, 2008	Mount Lemmon	Mount Lemmon Survey	MAS	770 m	MPC · JPL
381394	2008 GQ_{62}	—	April 5, 2008	Catalina	CSS	·	1.2 km	MPC · JPL
381395	2008 GC_{64}	—	April 5, 2008	Catalina	CSS	·	1.7 km	MPC · JPL
381396	2008 GN_{68}	—	April 6, 2008	Kitt Peak	Spacewatch	·	1.5 km	MPC · JPL
381397	2008 GH_{78}	—	April 7, 2008	Kitt Peak	Spacewatch	·	1.5 km	MPC · JPL
381398	2008 GM_{95}	—	April 8, 2008	Kitt Peak	Spacewatch	·	1.1 km	MPC · JPL
381399	2008 GK_{98}	—	March 27, 2008	Kitt Peak	Spacewatch	·	840 m	MPC · JPL
381400	2008 GR_{105}	—	April 11, 2008	Catalina	CSS	PHO	1.1 km	MPC · JPL

== 381401–381500 ==
back to top

Designation			Discovery			Properties		Ref
Permanent	Provisional	Named after	Date	Site	Discoverer(s)	Category	Diam.	Ref
381401	2008 GL_{112}	—	April 11, 2008	Mount Lemmon	Mount Lemmon Survey	·	1.2 km	MPC · JPL
381402	2008 GQ_{119}	—	April 11, 2008	Kitt Peak	Spacewatch	·	1.1 km	MPC · JPL
381403	2008 GN_{124}	—	March 11, 2008	Mount Lemmon	Mount Lemmon Survey	·	850 m	MPC · JPL
381404	2008 GO_{145}	—	April 7, 2008	Kitt Peak	Spacewatch	·	1.1 km	MPC · JPL
381405	2008 HJ_{14}	—	April 25, 2008	Kitt Peak	Spacewatch	·	640 m	MPC · JPL
381406	2008 HQ_{32}	—	April 29, 2008	Mount Lemmon	Mount Lemmon Survey	·	1.7 km	MPC · JPL
381407	2008 HJ_{35}	—	April 28, 2008	Kitt Peak	Spacewatch	·	1.4 km	MPC · JPL
381408	2008 HU_{40}	—	April 26, 2008	Mount Lemmon	Mount Lemmon Survey	·	770 m	MPC · JPL
381409	2008 HM_{47}	—	April 13, 2008	Mount Lemmon	Mount Lemmon Survey	L5	10 km	MPC · JPL
381410	2008 HV_{56}	—	April 30, 2008	Kitt Peak	Spacewatch	·	760 m	MPC · JPL
381411	2008 JE_{7}	—	May 2, 2008	Kitt Peak	Spacewatch	·	1.4 km	MPC · JPL
381412	2008 JE_{12}	—	May 3, 2008	Kitt Peak	Spacewatch	·	1.1 km	MPC · JPL
381413	2008 JM_{32}	—	May 7, 2008	Kitt Peak	Spacewatch	·	1.7 km	MPC · JPL
381414	2008 JK_{37}	—	May 3, 2008	Mount Lemmon	Mount Lemmon Survey	·	1.1 km	MPC · JPL
381415	2008 KY_{7}	—	May 27, 2008	Kitt Peak	Spacewatch	L5	7.8 km	MPC · JPL
381416	2008 KX_{8}	—	May 27, 2008	Kitt Peak	Spacewatch	·	1.5 km	MPC · JPL
381417	2008 KJ_{11}	—	May 29, 2008	Mount Lemmon	Mount Lemmon Survey	L5	10 km	MPC · JPL
381418	2008 KQ_{29}	—	May 29, 2008	Kitt Peak	Spacewatch	·	1.5 km	MPC · JPL
381419	2008 KE_{43}	—	May 29, 2008	Kitt Peak	Spacewatch	L5	12 km	MPC · JPL
381420	2008 LS_{2}	—	June 1, 2008	Kitt Peak	Spacewatch	L5	10 km	MPC · JPL
381421	2008 LZ_{10}	—	June 6, 2008	Kitt Peak	Spacewatch	·	1.3 km	MPC · JPL
381422	2008 LN_{13}	—	June 7, 2008	Kitt Peak	Spacewatch	L5	15 km	MPC · JPL
381423	2008 MY_{1}	—	June 4, 2008	Mount Lemmon	Mount Lemmon Survey	·	900 m	MPC · JPL
381424	2008 MC_{5}	—	June 29, 2008	Siding Spring	SSS	526	3.2 km	MPC · JPL
381425	2008 NB_{3}	—	July 10, 2008	La Sagra	OAM	·	1.7 km	MPC · JPL
381426	2008 OM_{10}	—	July 30, 2008	Catalina	CSS	·	2.6 km	MPC · JPL
381427	2008 OD_{13}	—	July 29, 2008	La Sagra	OAM	·	1.0 km	MPC · JPL
381428	2008 OJ_{22}	—	July 30, 2008	Kitt Peak	Spacewatch	·	2.1 km	MPC · JPL
381429	2008 OT_{23}	—	July 30, 2008	Kitt Peak	Spacewatch	·	1.8 km	MPC · JPL
381430	2008 OU_{23}	—	July 30, 2008	Kitt Peak	Spacewatch	EUN	1.4 km	MPC · JPL
381431	2008 PW_{9}	—	August 5, 2008	Cerro Burek	Burek, Cerro	·	2.9 km	MPC · JPL
381432	2008 PJ_{14}	—	August 10, 2008	Dauban	Kugel, F.	·	1.3 km	MPC · JPL
381433	2008 PJ_{18}	—	August 10, 2008	Vicques	M. Ory	KON	3.2 km	MPC · JPL
381434	2008 PM_{19}	—	August 7, 2008	Kitt Peak	Spacewatch	·	1.3 km	MPC · JPL
381435	2008 QG_{4}	—	August 20, 2008	Kitt Peak	Spacewatch	·	2.0 km	MPC · JPL
381436	2008 QA_{5}	—	August 22, 2008	Kitt Peak	Spacewatch	·	2.4 km	MPC · JPL
381437	2008 QN_{9}	—	August 25, 2008	La Sagra	OAM	·	1.7 km	MPC · JPL
381438	2008 QR_{9}	—	August 26, 2008	La Sagra	OAM	NEM	2.7 km	MPC · JPL
381439	2008 QS_{9}	—	August 26, 2008	La Sagra	OAM	·	2.0 km	MPC · JPL
381440	2008 QP_{10}	—	August 26, 2008	La Sagra	OAM	GEF	1.6 km	MPC · JPL
381441	2008 QP_{16}	—	August 25, 2008	La Sagra	OAM	·	2.5 km	MPC · JPL
381442	2008 QH_{30}	—	August 30, 2008	Socorro	LINEAR	·	3.8 km	MPC · JPL
381443	2008 QJ_{31}	—	August 30, 2008	Socorro	LINEAR	·	2.2 km	MPC · JPL
381444	2008 QV_{32}	—	August 30, 2008	Uccle	T. Pauwels, E. W. Elst	·	2.1 km	MPC · JPL
381445	2008 QN_{33}	—	August 30, 2008	Altschwendt	W. Ries	MAR	1.4 km	MPC · JPL
381446	2008 QL_{44}	—	August 24, 2008	Socorro	LINEAR	ADE	2.0 km	MPC · JPL
381447	2008 RH_{13}	—	September 4, 2008	Kitt Peak	Spacewatch	·	2.5 km	MPC · JPL
381448	2008 RK_{16}	—	September 4, 2008	Kitt Peak	Spacewatch	·	1.7 km	MPC · JPL
381449	2008 RY_{18}	—	September 4, 2008	Kitt Peak	Spacewatch	·	2.9 km	MPC · JPL
381450	2008 RV_{19}	—	September 4, 2008	Kitt Peak	Spacewatch	AGN	1.2 km	MPC · JPL
381451	2008 RA_{23}	—	September 2, 2008	Kitt Peak	Spacewatch	·	2.1 km	MPC · JPL
381452	2008 RE_{25}	—	September 3, 2008	Kitt Peak	Spacewatch	·	2.2 km	MPC · JPL
381453	2008 RO_{26}	—	September 8, 2008	Taunus	R. Kling, Zimmer, U.	·	2.2 km	MPC · JPL
381454	2008 RN_{35}	—	September 2, 2008	Kitt Peak	Spacewatch	·	1.6 km	MPC · JPL
381455	2008 RA_{42}	—	September 2, 2008	Kitt Peak	Spacewatch	·	1.5 km	MPC · JPL
381456	2008 RB_{44}	—	September 2, 2008	Kitt Peak	Spacewatch	·	1.7 km	MPC · JPL
381457	2008 RM_{53}	—	September 3, 2008	Kitt Peak	Spacewatch	·	2.0 km	MPC · JPL
381458 Moiseenko	2008 RG_{78}	Moiseenko	September 2, 2008	Zelenchukskaya Stn	Zelenchukskaya Stn	·	2.0 km	MPC · JPL
381459	2008 RE_{85}	—	September 4, 2008	Kitt Peak	Spacewatch	·	1.5 km	MPC · JPL
381460	2008 RJ_{86}	—	September 5, 2008	Kitt Peak	Spacewatch	·	2.8 km	MPC · JPL
381461	2008 RO_{94}	—	September 7, 2008	Mount Lemmon	Mount Lemmon Survey	·	1 km	MPC · JPL
381462	2008 RC_{104}	—	September 5, 2008	Kitt Peak	Spacewatch	·	1.7 km	MPC · JPL
381463	2008 RH_{114}	—	September 6, 2008	Mount Lemmon	Mount Lemmon Survey	HOF	2.3 km	MPC · JPL
381464	2008 RC_{115}	—	September 6, 2008	Mount Lemmon	Mount Lemmon Survey	BRA	1.3 km	MPC · JPL
381465	2008 RS_{115}	—	September 7, 2008	Mount Lemmon	Mount Lemmon Survey	·	1.9 km	MPC · JPL
381466	2008 RA_{118}	—	September 9, 2008	Mount Lemmon	Mount Lemmon Survey	HOF	2.2 km	MPC · JPL
381467	2008 RX_{119}	—	September 4, 2008	Kitt Peak	Spacewatch	·	1.6 km	MPC · JPL
381468	2008 RQ_{120}	—	September 6, 2008	Kitt Peak	Spacewatch	·	1.9 km	MPC · JPL
381469	2008 RE_{129}	—	September 9, 2008	Mount Lemmon	Mount Lemmon Survey	KOR	1.4 km	MPC · JPL
381470	2008 RS_{130}	—	September 8, 2008	Catalina	CSS	·	2.9 km	MPC · JPL
381471	2008 RN_{137}	—	September 5, 2008	Socorro	LINEAR	·	1.9 km	MPC · JPL
381472	2008 RQ_{137}	—	September 5, 2008	Kitt Peak	Spacewatch	·	1.8 km	MPC · JPL
381473	2008 RV_{141}	—	September 7, 2008	Mount Lemmon	Mount Lemmon Survey	·	1.7 km	MPC · JPL
381474	2008 SQ_{5}	—	September 22, 2008	Socorro	LINEAR	MRX	1.3 km	MPC · JPL
381475	2008 SM_{6}	—	September 22, 2008	Socorro	LINEAR	·	2.2 km	MPC · JPL
381476	2008 SA_{20}	—	September 19, 2008	Kitt Peak	Spacewatch	·	1.3 km	MPC · JPL
381477	2008 SK_{32}	—	September 20, 2008	Kitt Peak	Spacewatch	·	3.5 km	MPC · JPL
381478	2008 SR_{32}	—	September 20, 2008	Kitt Peak	Spacewatch	·	2.2 km	MPC · JPL
381479	2008 SW_{39}	—	September 20, 2008	Kitt Peak	Spacewatch	·	2.0 km	MPC · JPL
381480	2008 SV_{42}	—	September 20, 2008	Kitt Peak	Spacewatch	·	2.0 km	MPC · JPL
381481	2008 SZ_{59}	—	September 20, 2008	Catalina	CSS	·	2.9 km	MPC · JPL
381482	2008 SL_{64}	—	September 21, 2008	Kitt Peak	Spacewatch	·	1.9 km	MPC · JPL
381483	2008 SW_{67}	—	September 21, 2008	Catalina	CSS	EUN	1.8 km	MPC · JPL
381484	2008 SA_{69}	—	September 22, 2008	Kitt Peak	Spacewatch	·	1.2 km	MPC · JPL
381485	2008 SM_{70}	—	September 22, 2008	Mount Lemmon	Mount Lemmon Survey	·	2.0 km	MPC · JPL
381486	2008 SE_{71}	—	September 22, 2008	Goodricke-Pigott	R. A. Tucker	·	2.3 km	MPC · JPL
381487	2008 SR_{79}	—	September 23, 2008	Mount Lemmon	Mount Lemmon Survey	·	1.3 km	MPC · JPL
381488	2008 SO_{82}	—	September 25, 2008	Hibiscus	S. F. Hönig, Teamo, N.	·	2.4 km	MPC · JPL
381489	2008 SR_{84}	—	September 28, 2008	Prairie Grass	Mahony, J.	·	1.9 km	MPC · JPL
381490	2008 SN_{86}	—	September 20, 2008	Kitt Peak	Spacewatch	·	2.1 km	MPC · JPL
381491	2008 SA_{88}	—	September 20, 2008	Catalina	CSS	·	1.7 km	MPC · JPL
381492	2008 SV_{90}	—	September 21, 2008	Kitt Peak	Spacewatch	HOF	2.5 km	MPC · JPL
381493	2008 SS_{99}	—	September 21, 2008	Kitt Peak	Spacewatch	·	2.0 km	MPC · JPL
381494	2008 SK_{102}	—	September 21, 2008	Kitt Peak	Spacewatch	·	2.6 km	MPC · JPL
381495	2008 SG_{103}	—	September 21, 2008	Mount Lemmon	Mount Lemmon Survey	·	2.2 km	MPC · JPL
381496	2008 SP_{109}	—	September 22, 2008	Mount Lemmon	Mount Lemmon Survey	·	2.4 km	MPC · JPL
381497	2008 SK_{116}	—	September 22, 2008	Kitt Peak	Spacewatch	KOR	1.3 km	MPC · JPL
381498	2008 SU_{116}	—	September 22, 2008	Mount Lemmon	Mount Lemmon Survey	HOF	2.6 km	MPC · JPL
381499	2008 SJ_{118}	—	September 22, 2008	Mount Lemmon	Mount Lemmon Survey	·	2.1 km	MPC · JPL
381500	2008 SF_{123}	—	September 22, 2008	Mount Lemmon	Mount Lemmon Survey	·	2.9 km	MPC · JPL

== 381501–381600 ==
back to top

Designation			Discovery			Properties		Ref
Permanent	Provisional	Named after	Date	Site	Discoverer(s)	Category	Diam.	Ref
381501	2008 SW_{123}	—	September 22, 2008	Mount Lemmon	Mount Lemmon Survey	·	2.0 km	MPC · JPL
381502	2008 SG_{124}	—	September 22, 2008	Mount Lemmon	Mount Lemmon Survey	HOF	2.3 km	MPC · JPL
381503	2008 SC_{125}	—	September 22, 2008	Mount Lemmon	Mount Lemmon Survey	·	2.5 km	MPC · JPL
381504	2008 SY_{129}	—	September 22, 2008	Kitt Peak	Spacewatch	·	2.4 km	MPC · JPL
381505	2008 SY_{132}	—	September 22, 2008	Kitt Peak	Spacewatch	·	1.8 km	MPC · JPL
381506	2008 SO_{143}	—	September 24, 2008	Mount Lemmon	Mount Lemmon Survey	·	2.1 km	MPC · JPL
381507	2008 SB_{144}	—	September 24, 2008	Catalina	CSS	·	2.8 km	MPC · JPL
381508	2008 SA_{152}	—	September 22, 2008	Bisei SG Center	BATTeRS	·	3.6 km	MPC · JPL
381509	2008 SL_{155}	—	September 23, 2008	Socorro	LINEAR	·	2.3 km	MPC · JPL
381510	2008 SW_{162}	—	September 28, 2008	Socorro	LINEAR	DOR	2.7 km	MPC · JPL
381511	2008 SX_{166}	—	September 22, 2008	Kitt Peak	Spacewatch	·	2.4 km	MPC · JPL
381512	2008 SK_{172}	—	September 21, 2008	Catalina	CSS	·	1.6 km	MPC · JPL
381513	2008 SB_{173}	—	September 22, 2008	Mount Lemmon	Mount Lemmon Survey	·	2.0 km	MPC · JPL
381514	2008 SL_{173}	—	September 22, 2008	Catalina	CSS	GEF	1.5 km	MPC · JPL
381515	2008 SH_{178}	—	September 23, 2008	Kitt Peak	Spacewatch	·	1.7 km	MPC · JPL
381516	2008 SR_{180}	—	September 24, 2008	Kitt Peak	Spacewatch	·	2.2 km	MPC · JPL
381517	2008 SK_{191}	—	September 25, 2008	Mount Lemmon	Mount Lemmon Survey	·	2.7 km	MPC · JPL
381518	2008 SU_{192}	—	September 25, 2008	Kitt Peak	Spacewatch	·	2.6 km	MPC · JPL
381519	2008 SL_{196}	—	September 25, 2008	Kitt Peak	Spacewatch	HOF	2.8 km	MPC · JPL
381520	2008 SV_{196}	—	September 25, 2008	Kitt Peak	Spacewatch	HOF	2.9 km	MPC · JPL
381521	2008 SO_{217}	—	September 29, 2008	Kitt Peak	Spacewatch	·	2.3 km	MPC · JPL
381522	2008 SV_{218}	—	September 30, 2008	La Sagra	OAM	ADE	3.6 km	MPC · JPL
381523	2008 SB_{219}	—	September 30, 2008	La Sagra	OAM	NEM	2.3 km	MPC · JPL
381524	2008 SY_{222}	—	September 25, 2008	Mount Lemmon	Mount Lemmon Survey	GEF	1.2 km	MPC · JPL
381525	2008 SE_{227}	—	September 28, 2008	Mount Lemmon	Mount Lemmon Survey	·	1.9 km	MPC · JPL
381526	2008 SV_{229}	—	September 28, 2008	Mount Lemmon	Mount Lemmon Survey	DOR	2.9 km	MPC · JPL
381527	2008 SC_{231}	—	September 5, 2008	Kitt Peak	Spacewatch	·	1.7 km	MPC · JPL
381528	2008 SV_{236}	—	September 29, 2008	Kitt Peak	Spacewatch	·	1.7 km	MPC · JPL
381529	2008 SP_{250}	—	September 23, 2008	Kitt Peak	Spacewatch	·	2.7 km	MPC · JPL
381530	2008 SU_{253}	—	September 22, 2008	Kitt Peak	Spacewatch	·	2.1 km	MPC · JPL
381531	2008 SL_{262}	—	September 24, 2008	Kitt Peak	Spacewatch	·	2.6 km	MPC · JPL
381532	2008 SL_{275}	—	September 23, 2008	Kitt Peak	Spacewatch	HOF	2.5 km	MPC · JPL
381533	2008 SS_{286}	—	September 22, 2008	Catalina	CSS	·	3.1 km	MPC · JPL
381534	2008 SY_{287}	—	September 23, 2008	Mount Lemmon	Mount Lemmon Survey	·	3.3 km	MPC · JPL
381535	2008 SL_{291}	—	September 22, 2008	Catalina	CSS	·	3.3 km	MPC · JPL
381536	2008 SG_{299}	—	September 22, 2008	Socorro	LINEAR	·	2.8 km	MPC · JPL
381537	2008 SO_{301}	—	September 23, 2008	Kitt Peak	Spacewatch	GEF	1.4 km	MPC · JPL
381538	2008 SS_{301}	—	September 23, 2008	Socorro	LINEAR	·	2.4 km	MPC · JPL
381539	2008 SG_{302}	—	September 23, 2008	Mount Lemmon	Mount Lemmon Survey	·	1.7 km	MPC · JPL
381540	2008 SC_{303}	—	September 24, 2008	Mount Lemmon	Mount Lemmon Survey	·	2.2 km	MPC · JPL
381541	2008 SB_{304}	—	September 24, 2008	Mount Lemmon	Mount Lemmon Survey	·	1.9 km	MPC · JPL
381542	2008 SO_{307}	—	September 29, 2008	Kitt Peak	Spacewatch	·	3.8 km	MPC · JPL
381543	2008 SJ_{308}	—	September 30, 2008	Socorro	LINEAR	·	2.1 km	MPC · JPL
381544	2008 TN_{1}	—	October 1, 2008	Socorro	LINEAR	·	2.0 km	MPC · JPL
381545	2008 TW_{4}	—	October 1, 2008	La Sagra	OAM	·	2.7 km	MPC · JPL
381546	2008 TZ_{19}	—	October 1, 2008	Mount Lemmon	Mount Lemmon Survey	·	2.8 km	MPC · JPL
381547	2008 TC_{28}	—	October 9, 2004	Kitt Peak	Spacewatch	·	1.6 km	MPC · JPL
381548	2008 TC_{40}	—	October 1, 2008	Mount Lemmon	Mount Lemmon Survey	·	3.4 km	MPC · JPL
381549	2008 TA_{51}	—	October 2, 2008	Kitt Peak	Spacewatch	·	1.9 km	MPC · JPL
381550	2008 TA_{58}	—	September 22, 2008	Kitt Peak	Spacewatch	AGN	1.1 km	MPC · JPL
381551	2008 TX_{59}	—	September 6, 2008	Mount Lemmon	Mount Lemmon Survey	·	1.5 km	MPC · JPL
381552	2008 TJ_{68}	—	October 2, 2008	Kitt Peak	Spacewatch	·	2.4 km	MPC · JPL
381553	2008 TO_{76}	—	October 2, 2008	Mount Lemmon	Mount Lemmon Survey	·	1.8 km	MPC · JPL
381554	2008 TU_{85}	—	September 25, 2008	Kitt Peak	Spacewatch	HNS	1.4 km	MPC · JPL
381555	2008 TB_{95}	—	October 6, 2008	Kitt Peak	Spacewatch	(11882)	1.5 km	MPC · JPL
381556	2008 TE_{98}	—	October 6, 2008	Kitt Peak	Spacewatch	·	2.0 km	MPC · JPL
381557	2008 TU_{98}	—	October 6, 2008	Kitt Peak	Spacewatch	·	1.7 km	MPC · JPL
381558	2008 TE_{110}	—	September 21, 2008	Catalina	CSS	·	3.3 km	MPC · JPL
381559	2008 TG_{114}	—	October 6, 2008	Kitt Peak	Spacewatch	·	2.1 km	MPC · JPL
381560	2008 TT_{116}	—	October 6, 2008	Catalina	CSS	·	2.1 km	MPC · JPL
381561	2008 TV_{147}	—	October 9, 2008	Mount Lemmon	Mount Lemmon Survey	·	1.9 km	MPC · JPL
381562	2008 TG_{164}	—	October 1, 2008	Mount Lemmon	Mount Lemmon Survey	KOR	1.1 km	MPC · JPL
381563	2008 TO_{188}	—	October 9, 2008	Kitt Peak	Spacewatch	·	1.6 km	MPC · JPL
381564	2008 UW_{5}	—	October 25, 2008	Modra	Gajdoš, Š.	AMO +1km	800 m	MPC · JPL
381565	2008 UX_{8}	—	October 17, 2008	Kitt Peak	Spacewatch	·	1.8 km	MPC · JPL
381566	2008 UC_{65}	—	October 21, 2008	Kitt Peak	Spacewatch	MRX	1.3 km	MPC · JPL
381567	2008 UY_{78}	—	September 5, 2008	Kitt Peak	Spacewatch	·	1.7 km	MPC · JPL
381568	2008 UD_{79}	—	September 23, 2008	Kitt Peak	Spacewatch	·	2.2 km	MPC · JPL
381569	2008 UG_{80}	—	October 22, 2008	Kitt Peak	Spacewatch	·	2.7 km	MPC · JPL
381570	2008 UP_{92}	—	October 24, 2008	Socorro	LINEAR	·	4.6 km	MPC · JPL
381571	2008 UB_{100}	—	October 27, 2008	Bisei SG Center	BATTeRS	·	1.8 km	MPC · JPL
381572	2008 UU_{110}	—	October 22, 2008	Kitt Peak	Spacewatch	PAD	1.5 km	MPC · JPL
381573	2008 UY_{123}	—	October 22, 2008	Mount Lemmon	Mount Lemmon Survey	·	2.0 km	MPC · JPL
381574	2008 UZ_{126}	—	October 22, 2008	Kitt Peak	Spacewatch	·	1.7 km	MPC · JPL
381575	2008 UN_{149}	—	October 23, 2008	Mount Lemmon	Mount Lemmon Survey	·	1.9 km	MPC · JPL
381576	2008 UK_{154}	—	October 23, 2008	Mount Lemmon	Mount Lemmon Survey	(12739)	1.6 km	MPC · JPL
381577	2008 UH_{183}	—	October 24, 2008	Mount Lemmon	Mount Lemmon Survey	·	2.0 km	MPC · JPL
381578	2008 UQ_{189}	—	October 25, 2008	Mount Lemmon	Mount Lemmon Survey	·	2.5 km	MPC · JPL
381579	2008 UG_{199}	—	October 28, 2008	Socorro	LINEAR	T_{j} (2.96)	3.7 km	MPC · JPL
381580	2008 UU_{206}	—	December 12, 2004	Kitt Peak	Spacewatch	·	2.2 km	MPC · JPL
381581	2008 UD_{212}	—	October 23, 2008	Lulin	LUSS	·	2.1 km	MPC · JPL
381582	2008 UO_{231}	—	October 26, 2008	Mount Lemmon	Mount Lemmon Survey	·	1.9 km	MPC · JPL
381583	2008 UW_{239}	—	October 26, 2008	Kitt Peak	Spacewatch	·	2.4 km	MPC · JPL
381584	2008 UU_{254}	—	October 27, 2008	Kitt Peak	Spacewatch	·	2.0 km	MPC · JPL
381585	2008 UV_{255}	—	October 27, 2008	Kitt Peak	Spacewatch	·	1.8 km	MPC · JPL
381586	2008 UZ_{300}	—	October 29, 2008	Kitt Peak	Spacewatch	·	2.6 km	MPC · JPL
381587	2008 UP_{321}	—	October 31, 2008	Mount Lemmon	Mount Lemmon Survey	·	1.7 km	MPC · JPL
381588	2008 UY_{326}	—	October 31, 2008	Mount Lemmon	Mount Lemmon Survey	·	2.7 km	MPC · JPL
381589	2008 UC_{333}	—	October 20, 2008	Mount Lemmon	Mount Lemmon Survey	H	640 m	MPC · JPL
381590	2008 UO_{335}	—	October 20, 2008	Kitt Peak	Spacewatch	KOR	1.4 km	MPC · JPL
381591	2008 UW_{343}	—	October 25, 2008	Kitt Peak	Spacewatch	·	2.3 km	MPC · JPL
381592	2008 UP_{347}	—	October 22, 2008	Kitt Peak	Spacewatch	·	2.2 km	MPC · JPL
381593	2008 UN_{355}	—	October 24, 2008	Catalina	CSS	·	2.3 km	MPC · JPL
381594	2008 UO_{356}	—	October 23, 2008	Kitt Peak	Spacewatch	·	1.6 km	MPC · JPL
381595	2008 US_{370}	—	October 30, 2008	Mount Lemmon	Mount Lemmon Survey	·	4.2 km	MPC · JPL
381596	2008 VE_{5}	—	November 6, 2008	Hibiscus	Teamo, N.	·	2.4 km	MPC · JPL
381597	2008 VH_{9}	—	November 2, 2008	Mount Lemmon	Mount Lemmon Survey	GEF	1.4 km	MPC · JPL
381598	2008 VZ_{29}	—	November 2, 2008	Kitt Peak	Spacewatch	NEM	2.1 km	MPC · JPL
381599	2008 VN_{51}	—	November 4, 2008	Kitt Peak	Spacewatch	·	3.9 km	MPC · JPL
381600	2008 VT_{65}	—	November 1, 2008	Mount Lemmon	Mount Lemmon Survey	·	5.6 km	MPC · JPL

== 381601–381700 ==
back to top

Designation			Discovery			Properties		Ref
Permanent	Provisional	Named after	Date	Site	Discoverer(s)	Category	Diam.	Ref
381601	2008 VA_{66}	—	November 1, 2008	Mount Lemmon	Mount Lemmon Survey	·	2.0 km	MPC · JPL
381602	2008 VH_{66}	—	November 1, 2008	Kitt Peak	Spacewatch	EUP	5.0 km	MPC · JPL
381603	2008 VT_{68}	—	November 6, 2008	Kitt Peak	Spacewatch	·	3.5 km	MPC · JPL
381604	2008 VF_{77}	—	November 26, 2003	Kitt Peak	Spacewatch	EOS	2.1 km	MPC · JPL
381605	2008 WT_{5}	—	November 17, 2008	Kitt Peak	Spacewatch	KOR	1.1 km	MPC · JPL
381606	2008 WF_{12}	—	November 18, 2008	Catalina	CSS	·	2.6 km	MPC · JPL
381607	2008 WX_{18}	—	September 22, 2008	Mount Lemmon	Mount Lemmon Survey	·	2.0 km	MPC · JPL
381608	2008 WL_{48}	—	November 17, 2008	Kitt Peak	Spacewatch	TRE	3.2 km	MPC · JPL
381609	2008 WP_{69}	—	November 18, 2008	Kitt Peak	Spacewatch	KOR	1.5 km	MPC · JPL
381610	2008 WF_{71}	—	November 19, 2008	Kitt Peak	Spacewatch	·	1.8 km	MPC · JPL
381611	2008 WM_{74}	—	September 7, 2008	Catalina	CSS	·	2.3 km	MPC · JPL
381612	2008 WF_{77}	—	November 20, 2008	Kitt Peak	Spacewatch	·	1.8 km	MPC · JPL
381613	2008 WJ_{80}	—	November 20, 2008	Kitt Peak	Spacewatch	·	3.0 km	MPC · JPL
381614	2008 WY_{80}	—	November 20, 2008	Kitt Peak	Spacewatch	EOS	1.8 km	MPC · JPL
381615	2008 WZ_{82}	—	November 20, 2008	Kitt Peak	Spacewatch	·	1.7 km	MPC · JPL
381616	2008 WH_{86}	—	November 21, 2008	Kitt Peak	Spacewatch	KOR	1.3 km	MPC · JPL
381617	2008 WM_{103}	—	November 30, 2008	Kitt Peak	Spacewatch	·	2.4 km	MPC · JPL
381618	2008 WJ_{120}	—	November 30, 2008	Kitt Peak	Spacewatch	EOS	2.0 km	MPC · JPL
381619	2008 WE_{130}	—	November 21, 2008	Kitt Peak	Spacewatch	·	2.3 km	MPC · JPL
381620	2008 WB_{136}	—	November 19, 2008	Kitt Peak	Spacewatch	·	3.0 km	MPC · JPL
381621	2008 WJ_{140}	—	November 17, 2008	Catalina	CSS	EUN	1.3 km	MPC · JPL
381622	2008 XJ_{2}	—	December 2, 2008	Bisei SG Center	BATTeRS	·	2.0 km	MPC · JPL
381623	2008 XN_{24}	—	September 7, 2008	Mount Lemmon	Mount Lemmon Survey	·	2.5 km	MPC · JPL
381624	2008 XV_{49}	—	December 7, 2008	Mount Lemmon	Mount Lemmon Survey	·	3.9 km	MPC · JPL
381625	2008 XR_{50}	—	December 7, 2008	Mount Lemmon	Mount Lemmon Survey	·	4.4 km	MPC · JPL
381626	2008 YB	—	December 17, 2008	Bisei SG Center	BATTeRS	·	4.1 km	MPC · JPL
381627	2008 YG_{6}	—	December 22, 2008	Dauban	Kugel, F.	·	4.5 km	MPC · JPL
381628	2008 YS_{16}	—	December 21, 2008	Mount Lemmon	Mount Lemmon Survey	·	2.1 km	MPC · JPL
381629	2008 YS_{21}	—	December 21, 2008	Mount Lemmon	Mount Lemmon Survey	·	5.4 km	MPC · JPL
381630	2008 YJ_{24}	—	December 23, 2008	Bisei SG Center	BATTeRS	EOS	2.7 km	MPC · JPL
381631	2008 YR_{25}	—	December 27, 2008	Piszkéstető	K. Sárneczky	·	3.1 km	MPC · JPL
381632	2008 YQ_{29}	—	December 21, 2008	Catalina	CSS	H	720 m	MPC · JPL
381633	2008 YA_{39}	—	December 29, 2008	Kitt Peak	Spacewatch	·	1.7 km	MPC · JPL
381634	2008 YL_{45}	—	December 29, 2008	Mount Lemmon	Mount Lemmon Survey	·	1.9 km	MPC · JPL
381635	2008 YM_{47}	—	December 29, 2008	Kitt Peak	Spacewatch	·	2.2 km	MPC · JPL
381636	2008 YQ_{63}	—	December 30, 2008	Mount Lemmon	Mount Lemmon Survey	HYG	2.7 km	MPC · JPL
381637	2008 YC_{76}	—	December 30, 2008	Mount Lemmon	Mount Lemmon Survey	·	3.2 km	MPC · JPL
381638	2008 YP_{85}	—	December 29, 2008	Kitt Peak	Spacewatch	·	2.3 km	MPC · JPL
381639	2008 YS_{96}	—	December 29, 2008	Mount Lemmon	Mount Lemmon Survey	THM	1.8 km	MPC · JPL
381640	2008 YK_{104}	—	December 29, 2008	Kitt Peak	Spacewatch	·	2.5 km	MPC · JPL
381641	2008 YJ_{113}	—	December 29, 2008	Kitt Peak	Spacewatch	·	3.0 km	MPC · JPL
381642	2008 YQ_{123}	—	December 30, 2008	Kitt Peak	Spacewatch	·	3.4 km	MPC · JPL
381643	2008 YR_{134}	—	December 30, 2008	Kitt Peak	Spacewatch	·	2.2 km	MPC · JPL
381644	2008 YD_{139}	—	December 30, 2008	Kitt Peak	Spacewatch	THM	2.4 km	MPC · JPL
381645	2008 YA_{140}	—	December 30, 2008	Kitt Peak	Spacewatch	·	3.1 km	MPC · JPL
381646	2008 YR_{143}	—	December 30, 2008	Kitt Peak	Spacewatch	·	3.7 km	MPC · JPL
381647	2008 YX_{152}	—	December 30, 2008	Mount Lemmon	Mount Lemmon Survey	·	3.1 km	MPC · JPL
381648	2008 YL_{162}	—	December 22, 2008	Kitt Peak	Spacewatch	·	3.5 km	MPC · JPL
381649	2008 YR_{168}	—	December 21, 2008	Kitt Peak	Spacewatch	·	3.7 km	MPC · JPL
381650	2008 YH_{169}	—	December 29, 2008	Mount Lemmon	Mount Lemmon Survey	·	3.8 km	MPC · JPL
381651	2008 YP_{170}	—	December 30, 2008	Mount Lemmon	Mount Lemmon Survey	·	4.1 km	MPC · JPL
381652	2009 AA_{17}	—	January 2, 2009	Kitt Peak	Spacewatch	·	3.8 km	MPC · JPL
381653	2009 AL_{19}	—	January 2, 2009	Mount Lemmon	Mount Lemmon Survey	VER	2.9 km	MPC · JPL
381654	2009 AE_{35}	—	January 15, 2009	Kitt Peak	Spacewatch	·	2.8 km	MPC · JPL
381655	2009 AF_{36}	—	January 15, 2009	Kitt Peak	Spacewatch	·	4.9 km	MPC · JPL
381656	2009 AG_{49}	—	January 1, 2009	Kitt Peak	Spacewatch	·	3.8 km	MPC · JPL
381657	2009 AA_{50}	—	January 3, 2009	Mount Lemmon	Mount Lemmon Survey	·	3.8 km	MPC · JPL
381658	2009 AF_{50}	—	January 1, 2009	Kitt Peak	Spacewatch	·	3.9 km	MPC · JPL
381659	2009 BS_{2}	—	January 19, 2009	Mayhill	Lowe, A.	·	4.3 km	MPC · JPL
381660	2009 BV_{5}	—	January 16, 2009	Lulin	LUSS	·	4.6 km	MPC · JPL
381661	2009 BG_{6}	—	January 17, 2009	Socorro	LINEAR	·	3.8 km	MPC · JPL
381662	2009 BJ_{9}	—	January 18, 2009	Socorro	LINEAR	URS	4.1 km	MPC · JPL
381663	2009 BC_{12}	—	January 21, 2009	Socorro	LINEAR	·	3.8 km	MPC · JPL
381664	2009 BR_{17}	—	January 16, 2009	Mount Lemmon	Mount Lemmon Survey	GEF	1.6 km	MPC · JPL
381665	2009 BV_{19}	—	September 19, 2007	Kitt Peak	Spacewatch	THM	1.7 km	MPC · JPL
381666	2009 BR_{21}	—	January 17, 2009	Kitt Peak	Spacewatch	·	3.5 km	MPC · JPL
381667	2009 BT_{28}	—	January 16, 2009	Kitt Peak	Spacewatch	·	5.3 km	MPC · JPL
381668	2009 BC_{33}	—	January 16, 2009	Kitt Peak	Spacewatch	·	4.9 km	MPC · JPL
381669	2009 BE_{45}	—	January 16, 2009	Kitt Peak	Spacewatch	·	3.2 km	MPC · JPL
381670	2009 BE_{48}	—	October 8, 2007	Mount Lemmon	Mount Lemmon Survey	THM	1.9 km	MPC · JPL
381671	2009 BJ_{48}	—	January 16, 2009	Mount Lemmon	Mount Lemmon Survey	·	5.1 km	MPC · JPL
381672	2009 BA_{55}	—	January 16, 2009	Mount Lemmon	Mount Lemmon Survey	·	5.6 km	MPC · JPL
381673	2009 BB_{70}	—	January 25, 2009	Catalina	CSS	HYG	2.9 km	MPC · JPL
381674	2009 BE_{79}	—	November 24, 2008	Mount Lemmon	Mount Lemmon Survey	·	2.8 km	MPC · JPL
381675	2009 BX_{79}	—	January 30, 2009	Siding Spring	SSS	·	3.8 km	MPC · JPL
381676	2009 BE_{80}	—	January 16, 2009	Kitt Peak	Spacewatch	H	640 m	MPC · JPL
381677	2009 BJ_{81}	—	October 30, 2008	Kitt Peak	Spacewatch	AMO · APO · slow	470 m	MPC · JPL
381678	2009 BD_{91}	—	January 25, 2009	Kitt Peak	Spacewatch	·	2.6 km	MPC · JPL
381679	2009 BH_{92}	—	January 25, 2009	Kitt Peak	Spacewatch	·	2.3 km	MPC · JPL
381680	2009 BR_{95}	—	January 26, 2009	Mount Lemmon	Mount Lemmon Survey	·	3.1 km	MPC · JPL
381681	2009 BF_{112}	—	January 30, 2009	Mount Lemmon	Mount Lemmon Survey	·	3.6 km	MPC · JPL
381682	2009 BL_{142}	—	January 30, 2009	Kitt Peak	Spacewatch	·	3.9 km	MPC · JPL
381683	2009 BT_{159}	—	January 29, 2009	Mount Lemmon	Mount Lemmon Survey	·	3.1 km	MPC · JPL
381684	2009 BV_{181}	—	January 29, 2009	Catalina	CSS	TIR	3.4 km	MPC · JPL
381685	2009 BS_{183}	—	October 9, 2007	Catalina	CSS	·	3.9 km	MPC · JPL
381686	2009 BF_{187}	—	January 26, 2009	Socorro	LINEAR	·	2.8 km	MPC · JPL
381687	2009 CY	—	February 2, 2009	Sierra Stars	Tozzi, F.	·	3.1 km	MPC · JPL
381688	2009 CG_{1}	—	February 2, 2009	Bisei SG Center	BATTeRS	·	2.8 km	MPC · JPL
381689	2009 CK_{14}	—	February 3, 2009	Mount Lemmon	Mount Lemmon Survey	EUP	5.3 km	MPC · JPL
381690	2009 CN_{32}	—	February 1, 2009	Kitt Peak	Spacewatch	THM	2.7 km	MPC · JPL
381691	2009 CF_{34}	—	February 2, 2009	Mount Lemmon	Mount Lemmon Survey	·	2.4 km	MPC · JPL
381692	2009 CP_{39}	—	January 18, 2009	Kitt Peak	Spacewatch	·	2.2 km	MPC · JPL
381693	2009 CH_{50}	—	February 14, 2009	La Sagra	OAM	LIX	5.2 km	MPC · JPL
381694	2009 CS_{50}	—	February 14, 2009	La Sagra	OAM	·	2.5 km	MPC · JPL
381695	2009 CQ_{55}	—	February 14, 2009	Catalina	CSS	·	2.6 km	MPC · JPL
381696	2009 CO_{60}	—	October 2, 2008	Mount Lemmon	Mount Lemmon Survey	·	3.4 km	MPC · JPL
381697	2009 DT_{6}	—	February 17, 2009	Kitt Peak	Spacewatch	·	4.7 km	MPC · JPL
381698	2009 DD_{74}	—	February 26, 2009	Catalina	CSS	THB	2.8 km	MPC · JPL
381699	2009 DY_{127}	—	February 20, 2009	Siding Spring	SSS	·	5.5 km	MPC · JPL
381700	2009 EW_{12}	—	March 3, 2009	Catalina	CSS	·	3.3 km	MPC · JPL

== 381701–381800 ==
back to top

Designation			Discovery			Properties		Ref
Permanent	Provisional	Named after	Date	Site	Discoverer(s)	Category	Diam.	Ref
381701	2009 EU_{13}	—	March 15, 2009	Catalina	CSS	·	3.0 km	MPC · JPL
381702	2009 FP_{75}	—	March 18, 2009	Socorro	LINEAR	·	3.3 km	MPC · JPL
381703	2009 HD_{84}	—	April 27, 2009	Kitt Peak	Spacewatch	L5	8.3 km	MPC · JPL
381704	2009 HT_{95}	—	November 19, 2007	Mount Lemmon	Mount Lemmon Survey	EOS	2.2 km	MPC · JPL
381705	2009 LH_{6}	—	June 15, 2009	Mount Lemmon	Mount Lemmon Survey	·	860 m	MPC · JPL
381706	2009 NB_{2}	—	July 13, 2009	Kitt Peak	Spacewatch	·	670 m	MPC · JPL
381707	2009 PL_{4}	—	August 14, 2009	La Sagra	OAM	·	1.2 km	MPC · JPL
381708	2009 PM_{11}	—	August 15, 2009	Kitt Peak	Spacewatch	·	1 km	MPC · JPL
381709	2009 PC_{15}	—	August 15, 2009	Catalina	CSS	ERI	1.5 km	MPC · JPL
381710	2009 PL_{17}	—	August 15, 2009	La Sagra	OAM	·	1.1 km	MPC · JPL
381711	2009 PA_{18}	—	August 15, 2009	Kitt Peak	Spacewatch	·	990 m	MPC · JPL
381712	2009 QE_{4}	—	August 17, 2009	Catalina	CSS	·	1.4 km	MPC · JPL
381713	2009 QQ_{6}	—	August 18, 2009	Wildberg	R. Apitzsch	NYS	990 m	MPC · JPL
381714	2009 QU_{8}	—	August 17, 2009	La Sagra	OAM	PHO	1.1 km	MPC · JPL
381715	2009 QB_{27}	—	August 17, 2009	Kitt Peak	Spacewatch	NYS	1.0 km	MPC · JPL
381716	2009 QA_{38}	—	August 31, 2009	Bergisch Gladbach	W. Bickel	·	1.3 km	MPC · JPL
381717	2009 QP_{41}	—	August 16, 2009	Kitt Peak	Spacewatch	·	1.0 km	MPC · JPL
381718	2009 QG_{46}	—	August 15, 2009	Kitt Peak	Spacewatch	·	1.0 km	MPC · JPL
381719	2009 QQ_{46}	—	August 27, 2009	Catalina	CSS	MAS	670 m	MPC · JPL
381720	2009 QX_{52}	—	August 27, 2009	Kitt Peak	Spacewatch	·	1.0 km	MPC · JPL
381721	2009 QU_{60}	—	September 19, 2006	Anderson Mesa	LONEOS	·	850 m	MPC · JPL
381722	2009 RG	—	September 9, 2009	Bisei SG Center	BATTeRS	·	890 m	MPC · JPL
381723	2009 RL_{3}	—	September 11, 2009	La Sagra	OAM	·	1.5 km	MPC · JPL
381724	2009 RQ_{3}	—	September 13, 2009	Socorro	LINEAR	BAP	1.1 km	MPC · JPL
381725 Bobrinsky	2009 RP_{5}	Bobrinsky	September 13, 2009	ESA OGS	ESA OGS	NYS	1.1 km	MPC · JPL
381726	2009 RW_{12}	—	September 12, 2009	Kitt Peak	Spacewatch	·	1.2 km	MPC · JPL
381727	2009 RX_{16}	—	September 12, 2009	Kitt Peak	Spacewatch	MAS	720 m	MPC · JPL
381728	2009 RF_{17}	—	September 12, 2009	Kitt Peak	Spacewatch	·	1.4 km	MPC · JPL
381729	2009 RW_{18}	—	September 13, 2009	Purple Mountain	PMO NEO Survey Program	·	990 m	MPC · JPL
381730	2009 RD_{19}	—	September 15, 2009	Kitt Peak	Spacewatch	·	1.7 km	MPC · JPL
381731	2009 RT_{21}	—	September 15, 2009	Kitt Peak	Spacewatch	·	950 m	MPC · JPL
381732	2009 RJ_{26}	—	September 13, 2009	Socorro	LINEAR	·	1.3 km	MPC · JPL
381733	2009 RU_{45}	—	September 15, 2009	Kitt Peak	Spacewatch	·	1.1 km	MPC · JPL
381734	2009 RH_{46}	—	September 15, 2009	Kitt Peak	Spacewatch	·	1.7 km	MPC · JPL
381735	2009 RQ_{53}	—	September 15, 2009	Kitt Peak	Spacewatch	·	1.5 km	MPC · JPL
381736	2009 RS_{53}	—	September 15, 2009	Kitt Peak	Spacewatch	·	1.4 km	MPC · JPL
381737	2009 RU_{61}	—	September 14, 2009	La Sagra	OAM	NYS	1.1 km	MPC · JPL
381738	2009 RP_{70}	—	September 12, 2009	Kitt Peak	Spacewatch	·	1.2 km	MPC · JPL
381739	2009 SG_{1}	—	September 17, 2009	Mount Lemmon	Mount Lemmon Survey	L5	10 km	MPC · JPL
381740	2009 SJ_{24}	—	September 16, 2009	Kitt Peak	Spacewatch	·	1.4 km	MPC · JPL
381741	2009 SN_{34}	—	September 16, 2009	Kitt Peak	Spacewatch	·	1.1 km	MPC · JPL
381742	2009 SF_{51}	—	September 17, 2009	Kitt Peak	Spacewatch	MAS	690 m	MPC · JPL
381743	2009 SE_{61}	—	September 17, 2009	Kitt Peak	Spacewatch	·	1.2 km	MPC · JPL
381744	2009 SD_{67}	—	September 17, 2009	Kitt Peak	Spacewatch	·	1.5 km	MPC · JPL
381745	2009 SB_{69}	—	September 17, 2009	Kitt Peak	Spacewatch	·	1.2 km	MPC · JPL
381746	2009 SW_{69}	—	November 17, 2006	Kitt Peak	Spacewatch	·	910 m	MPC · JPL
381747	2009 SX_{99}	—	September 21, 2009	La Sagra	OAM	PHO	1.4 km	MPC · JPL
381748	2009 SU_{101}	—	September 24, 2009	La Sagra	OAM	PHO	1.2 km	MPC · JPL
381749	2009 SP_{114}	—	September 18, 2009	Kitt Peak	Spacewatch	PHO	1.0 km	MPC · JPL
381750	2009 SL_{125}	—	September 18, 2009	Kitt Peak	Spacewatch	·	1.2 km	MPC · JPL
381751	2009 SQ_{127}	—	September 18, 2009	Kitt Peak	Spacewatch	·	1.1 km	MPC · JPL
381752	2009 SG_{129}	—	September 18, 2009	Kitt Peak	Spacewatch	·	1.1 km	MPC · JPL
381753	2009 ST_{142}	—	September 19, 2009	Kitt Peak	Spacewatch	·	1.3 km	MPC · JPL
381754	2009 SP_{146}	—	September 19, 2009	Kitt Peak	Spacewatch	·	1.1 km	MPC · JPL
381755	2009 SW_{146}	—	September 19, 2009	Kitt Peak	Spacewatch	NYS	1.0 km	MPC · JPL
381756	2009 SO_{150}	—	September 20, 2009	Kitt Peak	Spacewatch	(2076)	1.0 km	MPC · JPL
381757	2009 SZ_{160}	—	November 12, 2005	Kitt Peak	Spacewatch	NYS	1.3 km	MPC · JPL
381758	2009 SC_{185}	—	September 21, 2009	Kitt Peak	Spacewatch	·	1.6 km	MPC · JPL
381759	2009 SL_{200}	—	September 22, 2009	Kitt Peak	Spacewatch	·	2.2 km	MPC · JPL
381760	2009 SC_{215}	—	September 23, 2009	Kitt Peak	Spacewatch	·	1.4 km	MPC · JPL
381761	2009 SP_{230}	—	August 15, 2009	Kitt Peak	Spacewatch	V	750 m	MPC · JPL
381762	2009 SM_{238}	—	September 16, 2009	Catalina	CSS	·	1.9 km	MPC · JPL
381763	2009 SC_{263}	—	September 23, 2009	Mount Lemmon	Mount Lemmon Survey	·	1.5 km	MPC · JPL
381764	2009 SV_{266}	—	September 23, 2009	Mount Lemmon	Mount Lemmon Survey	·	1 km	MPC · JPL
381765	2009 SP_{275}	—	September 25, 2009	Kitt Peak	Spacewatch	·	1.1 km	MPC · JPL
381766	2009 SY_{275}	—	September 25, 2009	Kitt Peak	Spacewatch	MAS	600 m	MPC · JPL
381767	2009 SS_{288}	—	September 25, 2009	Catalina	CSS	NYS	1.5 km	MPC · JPL
381768	2009 SH_{291}	—	September 25, 2009	Kitt Peak	Spacewatch	·	1.2 km	MPC · JPL
381769	2009 SD_{317}	—	September 19, 2009	Mount Lemmon	Mount Lemmon Survey	V	640 m	MPC · JPL
381770	2009 SU_{324}	—	September 25, 2009	Kitt Peak	Spacewatch	MAS	730 m	MPC · JPL
381771	2009 SS_{325}	—	September 27, 2009	Kitt Peak	Spacewatch	·	2.0 km	MPC · JPL
381772	2009 SK_{326}	—	September 29, 2009	Črni Vrh	Skvarč, J.	·	1.4 km	MPC · JPL
381773	2009 SD_{331}	—	September 19, 2009	Catalina	CSS	NYS	1.2 km	MPC · JPL
381774	2009 SM_{331}	—	October 24, 1995	Kitt Peak	Spacewatch	V	770 m	MPC · JPL
381775	2009 SA_{337}	—	September 24, 2009	Catalina	CSS	·	1.4 km	MPC · JPL
381776	2009 SB_{340}	—	September 28, 2009	Kitt Peak	Spacewatch	NYS	930 m	MPC · JPL
381777	2009 SF_{345}	—	September 18, 2009	Kitt Peak	Spacewatch	·	1.3 km	MPC · JPL
381778	2009 SC_{346}	—	September 22, 2009	Kitt Peak	Spacewatch	NYS	1.1 km	MPC · JPL
381779	2009 SM_{347}	—	September 28, 2009	Mount Lemmon	Mount Lemmon Survey	·	1.1 km	MPC · JPL
381780	2009 TG_{1}	—	October 10, 2009	Bisei SG Center	BATTeRS	·	880 m	MPC · JPL
381781	2009 TW_{1}	—	June 4, 2005	Kitt Peak	Spacewatch	·	1.2 km	MPC · JPL
381782	2009 TX_{1}	—	October 9, 2009	Catalina	CSS	·	1.3 km	MPC · JPL
381783	2009 TS_{2}	—	August 18, 2009	Catalina	CSS	·	1.5 km	MPC · JPL
381784	2009 TZ_{4}	—	October 10, 2009	La Sagra	OAM	·	1.3 km	MPC · JPL
381785	2009 TF_{13}	—	September 15, 2009	Kitt Peak	Spacewatch	·	1.0 km	MPC · JPL
381786	2009 TP_{20}	—	November 14, 1998	Kitt Peak	Spacewatch	NYS	1.2 km	MPC · JPL
381787	2009 TU_{25}	—	October 14, 2009	Mount Lemmon	Mount Lemmon Survey	PHO	2.2 km	MPC · JPL
381788	2009 TG_{34}	—	October 11, 2009	La Sagra	OAM	·	1.6 km	MPC · JPL
381789	2009 TQ_{36}	—	October 14, 2009	La Sagra	OAM	·	1.2 km	MPC · JPL
381790	2009 TY_{36}	—	October 10, 2009	Sierra Stars	Dillon, W. G., Wells, D.	·	1 km	MPC · JPL
381791	2009 TE_{39}	—	October 15, 2009	Catalina	CSS	·	2.4 km	MPC · JPL
381792	2009 UC_{6}	—	June 17, 2009	Kitt Peak	Spacewatch	·	1.1 km	MPC · JPL
381793	2009 UA_{20}	—	October 20, 2009	Socorro	LINEAR	·	1.3 km	MPC · JPL
381794	2009 UO_{20}	—	October 22, 2009	Catalina	CSS	V	1.0 km	MPC · JPL
381795	2009 UH_{21}	—	October 23, 2009	Marly	P. Kocher	·	2.4 km	MPC · JPL
381796	2009 UF_{34}	—	October 18, 2009	Mount Lemmon	Mount Lemmon Survey	·	1.8 km	MPC · JPL
381797	2009 UK_{38}	—	October 22, 2009	Mount Lemmon	Mount Lemmon Survey	(5)	1.1 km	MPC · JPL
381798	2009 UJ_{41}	—	October 18, 2009	Mount Lemmon	Mount Lemmon Survey	·	2.0 km	MPC · JPL
381799	2009 UQ_{46}	—	October 18, 2009	Mount Lemmon	Mount Lemmon Survey	·	1.5 km	MPC · JPL
381800	2009 UM_{61}	—	September 17, 2009	Kitt Peak	Spacewatch	NYS	1.2 km	MPC · JPL

== 381801–381900 ==
back to top

Designation			Discovery			Properties		Ref
Permanent	Provisional	Named after	Date	Site	Discoverer(s)	Category	Diam.	Ref
381801	2009 UN_{68}	—	February 19, 2001	Socorro	LINEAR	·	900 m	MPC · JPL
381802	2009 US_{97}	—	October 23, 2009	Mount Lemmon	Mount Lemmon Survey	·	1.6 km	MPC · JPL
381803	2009 UM_{108}	—	October 23, 2009	Kitt Peak	Spacewatch	·	910 m	MPC · JPL
381804	2009 UG_{115}	—	October 21, 2009	Mount Lemmon	Mount Lemmon Survey	·	1.4 km	MPC · JPL
381805	2009 UH_{115}	—	April 14, 2008	Kitt Peak	Spacewatch	·	1.0 km	MPC · JPL
381806	2009 UP_{115}	—	September 16, 2009	Kitt Peak	Spacewatch	·	920 m	MPC · JPL
381807	2009 UD_{118}	—	February 21, 2007	Kitt Peak	Spacewatch	MAS	610 m	MPC · JPL
381808	2009 UT_{118}	—	October 23, 2009	Mount Lemmon	Mount Lemmon Survey	NYS	1.0 km	MPC · JPL
381809	2009 UC_{135}	—	October 24, 2009	Mount Lemmon	Mount Lemmon Survey	PHO	1.5 km	MPC · JPL
381810	2009 UH_{147}	—	October 24, 2009	Kitt Peak	Spacewatch	·	1.6 km	MPC · JPL
381811	2009 UE_{155}	—	April 13, 2004	Kitt Peak	Spacewatch	·	1.3 km	MPC · JPL
381812	2009 VQ_{2}	—	March 31, 2008	Catalina	CSS	·	2.9 km	MPC · JPL
381813	2009 VC_{23}	—	November 9, 2009	Mount Lemmon	Mount Lemmon Survey	·	1.4 km	MPC · JPL
381814	2009 VJ_{25}	—	November 10, 2009	Dauban	Kugel, F.	MAR	810 m	MPC · JPL
381815	2009 VT_{45}	—	October 23, 2009	Kitt Peak	Spacewatch	·	1.6 km	MPC · JPL
381816	2009 VG_{46}	—	November 9, 2009	Kitt Peak	Spacewatch	·	2.3 km	MPC · JPL
381817	2009 VE_{55}	—	November 11, 2009	Kitt Peak	Spacewatch	MAS	650 m	MPC · JPL
381818	2009 VV_{55}	—	October 22, 2009	Mount Lemmon	Mount Lemmon Survey	MAS	620 m	MPC · JPL
381819	2009 VM_{60}	—	November 11, 2009	Catalina	CSS	·	2.0 km	MPC · JPL
381820	2009 VT_{67}	—	November 9, 2009	Kitt Peak	Spacewatch	·	950 m	MPC · JPL
381821	2009 VE_{71}	—	November 9, 2009	Mount Lemmon	Mount Lemmon Survey	NYS	1.3 km	MPC · JPL
381822	2009 VC_{76}	—	November 13, 2009	La Sagra	OAM	·	1.5 km	MPC · JPL
381823	2009 VZ_{80}	—	July 23, 2009	Siding Spring	SSS	·	1.7 km	MPC · JPL
381824	2009 VS_{83}	—	November 9, 2009	Kitt Peak	Spacewatch	·	870 m	MPC · JPL
381825	2009 VF_{85}	—	November 10, 2009	Kitt Peak	Spacewatch	NYS	1.1 km	MPC · JPL
381826	2009 VX_{86}	—	November 10, 2009	Kitt Peak	Spacewatch	·	1.3 km	MPC · JPL
381827	2009 VD_{103}	—	November 11, 2009	Mount Lemmon	Mount Lemmon Survey	RAF	1.0 km	MPC · JPL
381828	2009 VP_{103}	—	November 11, 2009	Mount Lemmon	Mount Lemmon Survey	EUN	1.7 km	MPC · JPL
381829	2009 VQ_{103}	—	November 11, 2009	Mount Lemmon	Mount Lemmon Survey	·	1.3 km	MPC · JPL
381830	2009 VM_{116}	—	November 11, 2009	Mount Lemmon	Mount Lemmon Survey	·	2.2 km	MPC · JPL
381831	2009 VU_{116}	—	November 9, 2009	Mount Lemmon	Mount Lemmon Survey	·	1.9 km	MPC · JPL
381832	2009 WX_{20}	—	November 17, 2009	Kitt Peak	Spacewatch	·	1.6 km	MPC · JPL
381833	2009 WL_{27}	—	November 16, 2009	Kitt Peak	Spacewatch	·	1.2 km	MPC · JPL
381834	2009 WO_{27}	—	November 16, 2009	Kitt Peak	Spacewatch	·	1.0 km	MPC · JPL
381835	2009 WO_{31}	—	November 10, 2009	Kitt Peak	Spacewatch	HNS	1.5 km	MPC · JPL
381836	2009 WZ_{43}	—	November 17, 2009	Mount Lemmon	Mount Lemmon Survey	·	1.6 km	MPC · JPL
381837	2009 WQ_{77}	—	November 18, 2009	Kitt Peak	Spacewatch	·	1.2 km	MPC · JPL
381838	2009 WG_{79}	—	November 18, 2009	Mount Lemmon	Mount Lemmon Survey	·	1.5 km	MPC · JPL
381839	2009 WT_{80}	—	November 18, 2009	Kitt Peak	Spacewatch	V	1.1 km	MPC · JPL
381840	2009 WE_{88}	—	May 7, 2007	Catalina	CSS	·	3.1 km	MPC · JPL
381841	2009 WN_{94}	—	November 20, 2009	Mount Lemmon	Mount Lemmon Survey	·	1.2 km	MPC · JPL
381842	2009 WA_{100}	—	January 6, 2006	Mount Lemmon	Mount Lemmon Survey	·	1.1 km	MPC · JPL
381843	2009 WQ_{122}	—	November 20, 2009	Kitt Peak	Spacewatch	·	1.3 km	MPC · JPL
381844	2009 WV_{163}	—	December 2, 2005	Kitt Peak	Spacewatch	·	1.0 km	MPC · JPL
381845	2009 WP_{169}	—	November 22, 2009	Catalina	CSS	·	1.3 km	MPC · JPL
381846	2009 WK_{184}	—	November 25, 2005	Kitt Peak	Spacewatch	·	1.1 km	MPC · JPL
381847	2009 WU_{229}	—	November 17, 2009	Mount Lemmon	Mount Lemmon Survey	·	1.3 km	MPC · JPL
381848	2009 WX_{236}	—	November 16, 2009	Kitt Peak	Spacewatch	·	1.6 km	MPC · JPL
381849	2009 WD_{237}	—	November 16, 2009	Mount Lemmon	Mount Lemmon Survey	·	2.9 km	MPC · JPL
381850	2009 WJ_{240}	—	November 17, 2009	Mount Lemmon	Mount Lemmon Survey	·	2.6 km	MPC · JPL
381851	2009 WL_{247}	—	October 27, 2009	Catalina	CSS	·	2.0 km	MPC · JPL
381852	2009 WG_{249}	—	November 20, 2009	Mount Lemmon	Mount Lemmon Survey	EUN	1.2 km	MPC · JPL
381853	2009 WK_{259}	—	November 19, 2009	Mount Lemmon	Mount Lemmon Survey	(5)	1.0 km	MPC · JPL
381854	2009 WJ_{261}	—	November 16, 2009	Socorro	LINEAR	·	1.5 km	MPC · JPL
381855	2009 WD_{264}	—	November 16, 2009	Mount Lemmon	Mount Lemmon Survey	·	2.5 km	MPC · JPL
381856	2009 XP_{16}	—	December 15, 2009	Mount Lemmon	Mount Lemmon Survey	·	3.1 km	MPC · JPL
381857	2009 XL_{17}	—	December 15, 2009	Mount Lemmon	Mount Lemmon Survey	·	2.3 km	MPC · JPL
381858	2009 XS_{19}	—	December 15, 2009	Mount Lemmon	Mount Lemmon Survey	MAS	790 m	MPC · JPL
381859	2009 XC_{23}	—	December 15, 2009	Mount Lemmon	Mount Lemmon Survey	(5)	1.3 km	MPC · JPL
381860	2009 XS_{24}	—	December 15, 2009	Catalina	CSS	·	1.5 km	MPC · JPL
381861	2009 XZ_{24}	—	December 15, 2009	Mount Lemmon	Mount Lemmon Survey	·	2.5 km	MPC · JPL
381862	2009 YW_{7}	—	December 16, 2009	Kitt Peak	Spacewatch	·	1.2 km	MPC · JPL
381863	2009 YQ_{21}	—	December 27, 2009	Kitt Peak	Spacewatch	·	2.3 km	MPC · JPL
381864	2009 YP_{22}	—	December 18, 2009	Kitt Peak	Spacewatch	EUN	1.4 km	MPC · JPL
381865	2009 YW_{23}	—	December 19, 2009	Mount Lemmon	Mount Lemmon Survey	·	4.1 km	MPC · JPL
381866	2010 AF_{6}	—	January 6, 2010	Kitt Peak	Spacewatch	·	1.8 km	MPC · JPL
381867	2010 AP_{8}	—	September 10, 2004	Socorro	LINEAR	·	1.9 km	MPC · JPL
381868	2010 AV_{8}	—	January 6, 2010	Kitt Peak	Spacewatch	HOF	3.1 km	MPC · JPL
381869	2010 AC_{9}	—	September 23, 2008	Kitt Peak	Spacewatch	·	2.2 km	MPC · JPL
381870	2010 AC_{10}	—	January 6, 2010	Catalina	CSS	PHO	1.1 km	MPC · JPL
381871	2010 AJ_{20}	—	January 25, 2006	Kitt Peak	Spacewatch	·	1.5 km	MPC · JPL
381872	2010 AJ_{21}	—	January 6, 2010	Kitt Peak	Spacewatch	MAR	1.3 km	MPC · JPL
381873	2010 AP_{36}	—	January 7, 2010	Kitt Peak	Spacewatch	EUN	1.7 km	MPC · JPL
381874	2010 AS_{38}	—	January 8, 2010	Kitt Peak	Spacewatch	·	2.1 km	MPC · JPL
381875	2010 AK_{40}	—	January 12, 2010	Mayhill	Lowe, A.	·	2.7 km	MPC · JPL
381876	2010 AQ_{54}	—	January 8, 2010	Kitt Peak	Spacewatch	(12739)	2.3 km	MPC · JPL
381877	2010 AB_{56}	—	January 8, 2010	Kitt Peak	Spacewatch	·	2.6 km	MPC · JPL
381878	2010 AD_{56}	—	January 8, 2010	Kitt Peak	Spacewatch	·	1.7 km	MPC · JPL
381879	2010 AJ_{59}	—	January 6, 2010	Catalina	CSS	·	3.1 km	MPC · JPL
381880	2010 AJ_{66}	—	January 11, 2010	Kitt Peak	Spacewatch	·	2.2 km	MPC · JPL
381881	2010 AQ_{67}	—	April 24, 2007	Kitt Peak	Spacewatch	·	1.5 km	MPC · JPL
381882	2010 AR_{69}	—	January 12, 2010	Catalina	CSS	BRG	1.7 km	MPC · JPL
381883	2010 AL_{72}	—	January 13, 2010	Mount Lemmon	Mount Lemmon Survey	·	2.0 km	MPC · JPL
381884	2010 AJ_{75}	—	January 8, 2010	Catalina	CSS	EUN	3.6 km	MPC · JPL
381885	2010 AZ_{75}	—	January 10, 2010	Socorro	LINEAR	·	1.9 km	MPC · JPL
381886	2010 AL_{80}	—	January 9, 2006	Kitt Peak	Spacewatch	·	1.1 km	MPC · JPL
381887	2010 AU_{80}	—	January 7, 2010	Kitt Peak	Spacewatch	·	1.5 km	MPC · JPL
381888	2010 AT_{105}	—	January 12, 2010	WISE	WISE	·	3.5 km	MPC · JPL
381889	2010 AS_{107}	—	January 12, 2010	WISE	WISE	·	3.6 km	MPC · JPL
381890	2010 AT_{107}	—	March 13, 2010	Mount Lemmon	Mount Lemmon Survey	·	5.5 km	MPC · JPL
381891	2010 AZ_{125}	—	January 30, 2004	Kitt Peak	Spacewatch	·	4.7 km	MPC · JPL
381892	2010 BR	—	January 16, 2010	Socorro	LINEAR	·	1.7 km	MPC · JPL
381893	2010 BA_{1}	—	February 4, 2006	Catalina	CSS	EUN	1.5 km	MPC · JPL
381894	2010 BV_{2}	—	January 6, 2010	Kitt Peak	Spacewatch	EOS	2.4 km	MPC · JPL
381895	2010 BF_{4}	—	January 23, 2010	Bisei SG Center	BATTeRS	·	3.0 km	MPC · JPL
381896	2010 BT_{11}	—	January 16, 2010	WISE	WISE	·	4.2 km	MPC · JPL
381897	2010 BW_{40}	—	January 19, 2010	WISE	WISE	·	4.2 km	MPC · JPL
381898	2010 BM_{46}	—	January 19, 2010	WISE	WISE	URS	5.3 km	MPC · JPL
381899	2010 BB_{69}	—	November 7, 2007	Kitt Peak	Spacewatch	·	5.8 km	MPC · JPL
381900	2010 BU_{76}	—	March 18, 2010	Kitt Peak	Spacewatch	CYB	5.1 km	MPC · JPL

== 381901–382000 ==
back to top

Designation			Discovery			Properties		Ref
Permanent	Provisional	Named after	Date	Site	Discoverer(s)	Category	Diam.	Ref
381901	2010 CG_{2}	—	July 30, 2008	Mount Lemmon	Mount Lemmon Survey	(116763)	2.4 km	MPC · JPL
381902	2010 CV_{4}	—	February 7, 2010	La Sagra	OAM	·	2.5 km	MPC · JPL
381903	2010 CC_{12}	—	February 6, 2010	Mayhill	Mayhill	·	2.3 km	MPC · JPL
381904 Beatita	2010 CP_{12}	Beatita	February 12, 2010	Mayhill	Kurti, S.	·	1.4 km	MPC · JPL
381905	2010 CW_{17}	—	February 11, 2010	WISE	WISE	·	4.3 km	MPC · JPL
381906	2010 CL_{19}	—	February 13, 2010	Mount Lemmon	Mount Lemmon Survey	APO +1km · PHA	520 m	MPC · JPL
381907	2010 CB_{20}	—	February 8, 2010	Kitt Peak	Spacewatch	·	1.8 km	MPC · JPL
381908	2010 CU_{24}	—	February 9, 2010	Mount Lemmon	Mount Lemmon Survey	·	2.0 km	MPC · JPL
381909	2010 CG_{29}	—	February 9, 2010	Kitt Peak	Spacewatch	·	2.1 km	MPC · JPL
381910	2010 CJ_{32}	—	February 9, 2010	Kitt Peak	Spacewatch	·	4.1 km	MPC · JPL
381911	2010 CM_{32}	—	February 9, 2010	Kitt Peak	Spacewatch	·	2.0 km	MPC · JPL
381912	2010 CG_{40}	—	February 13, 2010	Kitt Peak	Spacewatch	THM	2.7 km	MPC · JPL
381913	2010 CC_{41}	—	February 13, 2010	Kitt Peak	Spacewatch	·	3.8 km	MPC · JPL
381914	2010 CP_{41}	—	February 5, 2010	Catalina	CSS	·	1.8 km	MPC · JPL
381915	2010 CL_{43}	—	February 5, 2010	Catalina	CSS	·	3.4 km	MPC · JPL
381916	2010 CD_{44}	—	February 13, 2010	Calvin-Rehoboth	Calvin College	·	1.4 km	MPC · JPL
381917	2010 CE_{58}	—	October 26, 2009	Kitt Peak	Spacewatch	·	1.8 km	MPC · JPL
381918	2010 CP_{61}	—	February 9, 2010	Kitt Peak	Spacewatch	·	3.6 km	MPC · JPL
381919	2010 CB_{70}	—	February 13, 2010	Mount Lemmon	Mount Lemmon Survey	·	2.0 km	MPC · JPL
381920	2010 CK_{76}	—	February 13, 2010	Mount Lemmon	Mount Lemmon Survey	·	1.6 km	MPC · JPL
381921	2010 CT_{79}	—	February 13, 2010	Mount Lemmon	Mount Lemmon Survey	·	2.9 km	MPC · JPL
381922	2010 CE_{85}	—	February 14, 2010	Kitt Peak	Spacewatch	GEF	1.4 km	MPC · JPL
381923	2010 CE_{86}	—	January 5, 2010	Kitt Peak	Spacewatch	·	3.0 km	MPC · JPL
381924	2010 CD_{107}	—	February 14, 2010	Mount Lemmon	Mount Lemmon Survey	THM	3.9 km	MPC · JPL
381925	2010 CT_{120}	—	December 9, 2004	Socorro	LINEAR	·	2.6 km	MPC · JPL
381926	2010 CY_{134}	—	February 10, 2010	WISE	WISE	·	4.8 km	MPC · JPL
381927	2010 CY_{137}	—	February 9, 2010	Mount Lemmon	Mount Lemmon Survey	PAD	3.7 km	MPC · JPL
381928	2010 CW_{143}	—	February 9, 2010	Kitt Peak	Spacewatch	·	2.1 km	MPC · JPL
381929	2010 CF_{144}	—	November 22, 2009	Mount Lemmon	Mount Lemmon Survey	·	1.8 km	MPC · JPL
381930	2010 CQ_{146}	—	February 13, 2010	Catalina	CSS	·	1.9 km	MPC · JPL
381931	2010 CB_{147}	—	February 13, 2010	Mount Lemmon	Mount Lemmon Survey	·	3.5 km	MPC · JPL
381932	2010 CV_{148}	—	August 24, 2008	Kitt Peak	Spacewatch	·	2.0 km	MPC · JPL
381933	2010 CM_{150}	—	February 14, 2010	Kitt Peak	Spacewatch	EOS	3.4 km	MPC · JPL
381934	2010 CA_{156}	—	May 21, 2006	Mount Lemmon	Mount Lemmon Survey	KOR	1.5 km	MPC · JPL
381935	2010 CD_{157}	—	April 11, 2005	Mount Lemmon	Mount Lemmon Survey	·	2.2 km	MPC · JPL
381936	2010 CM_{165}	—	February 10, 2010	Kitt Peak	Spacewatch	·	2.7 km	MPC · JPL
381937	2010 CD_{173}	—	February 6, 2010	Kitt Peak	Spacewatch	·	4.6 km	MPC · JPL
381938	2010 CY_{181}	—	February 14, 2010	Haleakala	Pan-STARRS 1	·	1.7 km	MPC · JPL
381939	2010 CD_{182}	—	February 14, 2010	Haleakala	Pan-STARRS 1	·	2.5 km	MPC · JPL
381940	2010 CN_{184}	—	February 13, 2010	Socorro	LINEAR	HOF	3.2 km	MPC · JPL
381941	2010 CM_{203}	—	January 18, 2009	Kitt Peak	Spacewatch	·	4.3 km	MPC · JPL
381942	2010 CH_{245}	—	February 3, 2010	WISE	WISE	·	3.1 km	MPC · JPL
381943	2010 CD_{250}	—	December 1, 2005	Kitt Peak	Spacewatch	·	1.4 km	MPC · JPL
381944	2010 DN_{6}	—	April 6, 2005	Mount Lemmon	Mount Lemmon Survey	·	2.2 km	MPC · JPL
381945	2010 DZ_{11}	—	February 16, 2010	Mount Lemmon	Mount Lemmon Survey	·	3.8 km	MPC · JPL
381946	2010 DP_{20}	—	February 19, 2010	Siding Spring	SSS	·	760 m	MPC · JPL
381947	2010 DK_{23}	—	February 18, 2010	WISE	WISE	EUP	3.7 km	MPC · JPL
381948	2010 DB_{27}	—	February 18, 2010	WISE	WISE	·	3.5 km	MPC · JPL
381949	2010 DS_{44}	—	February 17, 2010	Kitt Peak	Spacewatch	·	1.7 km	MPC · JPL
381950	2010 DF_{56}	—	February 23, 2010	WISE	WISE	·	3.9 km	MPC · JPL
381951	2010 DK_{78}	—	February 16, 2010	Catalina	CSS	(18466)	2.0 km	MPC · JPL
381952	2010 EQ_{21}	—	November 5, 1996	Kitt Peak	Spacewatch	·	3.1 km	MPC · JPL
381953	2010 EB_{40}	—	February 13, 2010	Catalina	CSS	·	2.8 km	MPC · JPL
381954	2010 EK_{40}	—	March 12, 2010	Catalina	CSS	·	1.7 km	MPC · JPL
381955	2010 EO_{45}	—	December 19, 2009	Kitt Peak	Spacewatch	·	2.0 km	MPC · JPL
381956	2010 EE_{66}	—	September 12, 2007	Mount Lemmon	Mount Lemmon Survey	TRE	2.4 km	MPC · JPL
381957	2010 EH_{69}	—	March 12, 2010	Kitt Peak	Spacewatch	·	3.3 km	MPC · JPL
381958	2010 EV_{70}	—	March 12, 2010	Kitt Peak	Spacewatch	·	2.2 km	MPC · JPL
381959	2010 EM_{72}	—	March 13, 2010	Mount Lemmon	Mount Lemmon Survey	THM	2.0 km	MPC · JPL
381960	2010 EV_{87}	—	September 26, 2000	Socorro	LINEAR	·	1.8 km	MPC · JPL
381961	2010 EJ_{94}	—	March 14, 2010	Mount Lemmon	Mount Lemmon Survey	·	2.7 km	MPC · JPL
381962	2010 EA_{95}	—	March 14, 2010	Mount Lemmon	Mount Lemmon Survey	·	4.4 km	MPC · JPL
381963	2010 EG_{101}	—	March 15, 2010	Kitt Peak	Spacewatch	EOS	2.2 km	MPC · JPL
381964	2010 EM_{105}	—	June 13, 2005	Junk Bond	D. Healy	·	3.4 km	MPC · JPL
381965	2010 ER_{106}	—	March 4, 2010	Kitt Peak	Spacewatch	·	3.8 km	MPC · JPL
381966	2010 EL_{110}	—	September 10, 2007	Kitt Peak	Spacewatch	·	3.2 km	MPC · JPL
381967	2010 EL_{112}	—	March 12, 2010	Mount Lemmon	Mount Lemmon Survey	·	2.1 km	MPC · JPL
381968	2010 EY_{113}	—	March 13, 2010	Catalina	CSS	JUN	1.2 km	MPC · JPL
381969	2010 EY_{141}	—	April 2, 2005	Mount Lemmon	Mount Lemmon Survey	THM	2.7 km	MPC · JPL
381970	2010 EL_{142}	—	March 15, 2010	Kitt Peak	Spacewatch	·	4.0 km	MPC · JPL
381971	2010 EV_{168}	—	March 7, 2010	WISE	WISE	(5)	1.7 km	MPC · JPL
381972	2010 EX_{171}	—	April 14, 2005	Kitt Peak	Spacewatch	EOS	2.5 km	MPC · JPL
381973	2010 EB_{172}	—	October 30, 2008	Catalina	CSS	BRA	1.9 km	MPC · JPL
381974	2010 FS_{18}	—	March 18, 2010	Mount Lemmon	Mount Lemmon Survey	·	4.4 km	MPC · JPL
381975	2010 FT_{84}	—	March 26, 2010	Kitt Peak	Spacewatch	·	3.4 km	MPC · JPL
381976	2010 FA_{86}	—	March 25, 2010	Mount Lemmon	Mount Lemmon Survey	ARM	3.5 km	MPC · JPL
381977	2010 FR_{89}	—	October 3, 2008	Kitt Peak	Spacewatch	·	1.8 km	MPC · JPL
381978	2010 FE_{98}	—	April 7, 2005	Kitt Peak	Spacewatch	·	2.1 km	MPC · JPL
381979	2010 GY_{48}	—	April 8, 2010	WISE	WISE	·	3.2 km	MPC · JPL
381980	2010 GA_{75}	—	April 8, 2010	Siding Spring	SSS	·	5.9 km	MPC · JPL
381981	2010 GF_{103}	—	April 6, 2010	Mount Lemmon	Mount Lemmon Survey	·	3.3 km	MPC · JPL
381982	2010 GC_{136}	—	April 4, 2010	Kitt Peak	Spacewatch	·	2.7 km	MPC · JPL
381983	2010 GP_{159}	—	April 10, 2010	Catalina	CSS	·	3.1 km	MPC · JPL
381984	2010 GQ_{172}	—	January 16, 2005	Kitt Peak	Spacewatch	·	2.8 km	MPC · JPL
381985	2010 GF_{173}	—	November 24, 2003	Kitt Peak	Spacewatch	·	3.8 km	MPC · JPL
381986	2010 HZ_{19}	—	April 20, 2010	Dauban	C. Rinner, F. Kugel	URS	4.6 km	MPC · JPL
381987	2010 HZ_{21}	—	May 29, 2008	Kitt Peak	Spacewatch	L5	11 km	MPC · JPL
381988	2010 HL_{78}	—	April 20, 2010	Kitt Peak	Spacewatch	·	4.3 km	MPC · JPL
381989	2010 HR_{80}	—	April 28, 2010	WISE	WISE	APO	780 m	MPC · JPL
381990	2010 HS_{102}	—	April 30, 2010	WISE	WISE	·	3.4 km	MPC · JPL
381991	2010 JZ_{154}	—	May 8, 2010	Mount Lemmon	Mount Lemmon Survey	·	3.9 km	MPC · JPL
381992	2010 JU_{177}	—	January 30, 2004	Socorro	LINEAR	·	3.5 km	MPC · JPL
381993	2010 KQ_{34}	—	May 19, 2010	WISE	WISE	·	2.4 km	MPC · JPL
381994	2010 KD_{98}	—	December 31, 2008	Mount Lemmon	Mount Lemmon Survey	·	3.7 km	MPC · JPL
381995	2010 LO_{34}	—	November 15, 2007	Mount Lemmon	Mount Lemmon Survey	VER	3.8 km	MPC · JPL
381996	2010 LB_{35}	—	October 2, 2003	Kitt Peak	Spacewatch	·	2.3 km	MPC · JPL
381997	2010 LS_{103}	—	February 7, 1999	Kitt Peak	Spacewatch	·	2.9 km	MPC · JPL
381998	2010 LF_{108}	—	June 13, 2010	Kitt Peak	Spacewatch	·	4.3 km	MPC · JPL
381999	2010 LO_{118}	—	June 14, 2010	WISE	WISE	·	3.0 km	MPC · JPL
382000	2010 MV_{110}	—	January 15, 2009	Socorro	LINEAR	·	4.3 km	MPC · JPL

back to top

== See also ==
- Meanings of minor-planet names: 381001–382000
