= Meanings of minor-planet names: 381001–382000 =

As minor planet discoveries are confirmed, they are given a permanent number by the IAU's Minor Planet Center (MPC), and the discoverers can then submit names for them, following the IAU's naming conventions. The list below concerns those minor planets in the specified number-range that have received names, and explains the meanings of those names.

Official naming citations of newly named small Solar System bodies are approved and published in a bulletin by IAU's Working Group for Small Bodies Nomenclature (WGSBN). Before May 2021, citations were published in MPC's Minor Planet Circulars for many decades. Recent citations can also be found on the JPL Small-Body Database (SBDB). Until his death in 2016, German astronomer Lutz D. Schmadel compiled these citations into the Dictionary of Minor Planet Names (DMP) and regularly updated the collection.

Based on Paul Herget's The Names of the Minor Planets, Schmadel also researched the unclear origin of numerous asteroids, most of which had been named prior to World War II. This article incorporates text from this source, which is in the public domain: SBDB New namings may only be added to this list below after official publication as the preannouncement of names is condemned. The WGSBN publishes a comprehensive guideline for the naming rules of non-cometary small Solar System bodies.

== 381001–381100 ==
Named minor planet	Provisional	This minor planet was named for...	Ref · Catalog
381048 Werber	2006 WA_{1}	Bernard Werber (born 1961) is a French science fiction writer. Werber's writing style mixes literary genres, including saga, science fiction and philosophical ideas. His most famous work is the trilogy Les Fourmis (The Ants).	JPL · 381048

== 381101–381200 ==
back to top

Named minor planet	Provisional	This minor planet was named for...	Ref · Catalog
There are no named minor planets in this number range

== 381201–381300 ==
back to top

Named minor planet	Provisional	This minor planet was named for...	Ref · Catalog
381260 Ouellette	2007 TD_{166}	John A. Ouellette (born 1968) is currently an operations manager at the National Research Council of Canada and an authority on blue straggler stars.	JPL · 381260

== 381301–381400 ==
back to top

Named minor planet	Provisional	This minor planet was named for...	Ref · Catalog
381323 Fanjinshi	2007 VV_{252}	Fan Jinshi (born 1938), the honorable dean of Dunhuang Academy, made great contribution to the archaeology survey and conservation of Chinese grottoes. She constructed "Digital Dunhuang" and a comprehensive protection system, which provides a model for the protection of world cultural heritage.	IAU · 381323

== 381401–381500 ==
back to top

Named minor planet	Provisional	This minor planet was named for...	Ref · Catalog
381458 Moiseenko	2008 RG_{78}	Vladimir Mikhailovich Moiseenko (born 1955), Professor Doctor of medical sciences, is Director of the Oncological center in St. Petersburg.	JPL · 381458

== 381501–381600 ==
back to top

Named minor planet	Provisional	This minor planet was named for...	Ref · Catalog
There are no named minor planets in this number range

== 381601–381700 ==
back to top

Named minor planet	Provisional	This minor planet was named for...	Ref · Catalog
There are no named minor planets in this number range

== 381701–381800 ==
back to top

Named minor planet	Provisional	This minor planet was named for...	Ref · Catalog
381725 Bobrinsky	2009 RP_{5}	Nicolas Bobrinsky (born 1958), French spaceflight engineer who served as the first program manager of the ESA's Space Situational Awareness Programme in 2009.	JPL · 381725

== 381801–381900 ==
back to top

Named minor planet	Provisional	This minor planet was named for...	Ref · Catalog
There are no named minor planets in this number range

== 381901–382000 ==
back to top

Named minor planet	Provisional	This minor planet was named for...	Ref · Catalog
381904 Beatita	2010 CP_{12}	Beata Tidmarsh, née Podolská (born 1966) was a longtime colleague of Slovak discoverer Stefan Kürti, who encouraged his devotion to astronomy	JPL · 381904

back to top

Preceded by 380,001–381,000	Meanings of minor-planet names List of minor planets: 381,001–382,000	Succeeded by 382,001–383,000
