= List of minor planets: 380001–381000 =

The following is a partial list of minor planets, running from minor-planet number 380001 through 381000, inclusive. The primary data for this and other partial lists is based on JPL's "Small-Body Orbital Elements" and data available from the Minor Planet Center. Critical list information is also provided by the MPC, unless otherwise specified from Lowell Observatory. A detailed description of the table's columns and additional sources are given on the main page including a complete list of every page in this series, and a statistical break-up on the dynamical classification of minor planets.

Also see the summary list of all named bodies in numerical and alphabetical order, and the corresponding naming citations for the number range of this particular list. New namings may only be added to this list after official publication, as the preannouncement of names is condemned by the Working Group for Small Bodies Nomenclature of the International Astronomical Union.

Near-Earth obj.	MBA (inner)	MBA (outer)	Centaur
Mars-crosser	MBA (middle)	Jupiter trojan	Trans-Neptunian obj.
Unclassified

== 380001–380100 ==
Designation			Discovery			Properties		Ref
Permanent	Provisional	Named after	Date	Site	Discoverer(s)	Category	Diam.	Ref
380001	2013 EM_{32}	—	November 17, 2007	Catalina	CSS	·	1.6 km	MPC · JPL
380002	2013 EV_{96}	—	February 12, 2008	Kitt Peak	Spacewatch	·	1.9 km	MPC · JPL
380003	2013 GD_{45}	—	January 27, 2007	Kitt Peak	Spacewatch	KOR	1.3 km	MPC · JPL
380004	2013 GS_{95}	—	March 24, 2003	Kitt Peak	Spacewatch	·	690 m	MPC · JPL
380005	2013 GG_{103}	—	February 10, 2002	Socorro	LINEAR	EOS	2.1 km	MPC · JPL
380006	2013 GZ_{109}	—	January 16, 2008	Mount Lemmon	Mount Lemmon Survey	·	1.6 km	MPC · JPL
380007	2013 JE_{44}	—	March 27, 2003	Kitt Peak	Spacewatch	·	780 m	MPC · JPL
380008	2013 NT_{6}	—	March 7, 2009	Mount Lemmon	Mount Lemmon Survey	·	1.4 km	MPC · JPL
380009	2013 OS_{6}	—	November 4, 2004	Kitt Peak	Spacewatch	·	2.4 km	MPC · JPL
380010	2013 OG_{8}	—	October 29, 2005	Catalina	CSS	ADE	2.6 km	MPC · JPL
380011	2013 PH_{2}	—	February 21, 2007	Mount Lemmon	Mount Lemmon Survey	GEF	1.5 km	MPC · JPL
380012	2013 PN_{11}	—	September 24, 1960	Palomar	C. J. van Houten, I. van Houten-Groeneveld, T. Gehrels	·	1.3 km	MPC · JPL
380013	2013 PX_{28}	—	August 25, 2001	Kitt Peak	Spacewatch	·	1.2 km	MPC · JPL
380014	2013 PS_{36}	—	January 12, 2002	Kitt Peak	Spacewatch	·	1.9 km	MPC · JPL
380015	2013 PA_{49}	—	November 20, 2003	Kitt Peak	Spacewatch	·	3.8 km	MPC · JPL
380016	2013 PX_{60}	—	October 7, 2004	Anderson Mesa	LONEOS	·	2.6 km	MPC · JPL
380017	2013 PP_{69}	—	July 5, 2000	Anderson Mesa	LONEOS	JUN	1.1 km	MPC · JPL
380018	2013 PB_{70}	—	July 21, 2006	Mount Lemmon	Mount Lemmon Survey	NYS	1.2 km	MPC · JPL
380019	2013 PY_{73}	—	April 16, 2005	Kitt Peak	Spacewatch	NYS	1.3 km	MPC · JPL
380020	2013 PL_{74}	—	October 9, 2004	Anderson Mesa	LONEOS	·	2.3 km	MPC · JPL
380021	2013 QD_{2}	—	September 25, 2009	Kitt Peak	Spacewatch	·	1.4 km	MPC · JPL
380022	2013 QH_{3}	—	May 13, 2008	Mount Lemmon	Mount Lemmon Survey	·	1.9 km	MPC · JPL
380023	2013 QL_{16}	—	September 16, 2001	Socorro	LINEAR	·	1.0 km	MPC · JPL
380024	2013 QN_{18}	—	February 16, 2010	Mount Lemmon	Mount Lemmon Survey	CYB	4.9 km	MPC · JPL
380025	2013 QQ_{21}	—	January 2, 2011	Mount Lemmon	Mount Lemmon Survey	MRX	1.2 km	MPC · JPL
380026	2013 QT_{26}	—	October 20, 2003	Socorro	LINEAR	·	730 m	MPC · JPL
380027	2013 QF_{33}	—	November 23, 2003	Kitt Peak	Spacewatch	VER	3.7 km	MPC · JPL
380028	2013 QZ_{42}	—	October 26, 2009	Mount Lemmon	Mount Lemmon Survey	·	2.3 km	MPC · JPL
380029	2013 QE_{50}	—	December 19, 2004	Mount Lemmon	Mount Lemmon Survey	·	1.2 km	MPC · JPL
380030	2013 QR_{57}	—	October 18, 1998	Kitt Peak	Spacewatch	·	1.5 km	MPC · JPL
380031	2013 QK_{62}	—	November 24, 2006	Mount Lemmon	Mount Lemmon Survey	MAS	1.0 km	MPC · JPL
380032	2013 QD_{69}	—	November 22, 2009	Catalina	CSS	·	3.6 km	MPC · JPL
380033	2013 QX_{94}	—	September 5, 2007	Mount Lemmon	Mount Lemmon Survey	·	3.5 km	MPC · JPL
380034	2013 RE_{2}	—	February 21, 2001	Kitt Peak	Spacewatch	·	1.5 km	MPC · JPL
380035	2013 RG_{14}	—	May 3, 2008	Mount Lemmon	Mount Lemmon Survey	·	1.3 km	MPC · JPL
380036	2013 RF_{25}	—	November 9, 2008	Mount Lemmon	Mount Lemmon Survey	·	3.7 km	MPC · JPL
380037	2013 RW_{25}	—	February 17, 2004	Kitt Peak	Spacewatch	·	1.8 km	MPC · JPL
380038	2013 RF_{26}	—	April 22, 2007	Mount Lemmon	Mount Lemmon Survey	·	4.8 km	MPC · JPL
380039	2013 RE_{27}	—	March 4, 2005	Mount Lemmon	Mount Lemmon Survey	·	780 m	MPC · JPL
380040	2013 RC_{35}	—	December 9, 2004	Kitt Peak	Spacewatch	·	2.7 km	MPC · JPL
380041	2013 RH_{35}	—	January 11, 2008	Mount Lemmon	Mount Lemmon Survey	V	880 m	MPC · JPL
380042	2013 RL_{36}	—	September 14, 1998	Kitt Peak	Spacewatch	NYS	1.5 km	MPC · JPL
380043	2013 RK_{37}	—	March 18, 2004	Socorro	LINEAR	H	540 m	MPC · JPL
380044	2013 RD_{39}	—	October 9, 2004	Kitt Peak	Spacewatch	·	2.3 km	MPC · JPL
380045	2013 RH_{47}	—	August 28, 2006	Catalina	CSS	·	690 m	MPC · JPL
380046	2013 RH_{58}	—	July 24, 1993	Kitt Peak	Spacewatch	·	2.0 km	MPC · JPL
380047	2013 RU_{60}	—	December 5, 2007	Kitt Peak	Spacewatch	·	740 m	MPC · JPL
380048	2013 RN_{68}	—	October 7, 2004	Kitt Peak	Spacewatch	MRX	1.1 km	MPC · JPL
380049	2013 RQ_{68}	—	September 11, 2005	Kitt Peak	Spacewatch	·	990 m	MPC · JPL
380050	2013 RM_{69}	—	December 22, 2003	Socorro	LINEAR	EOS	2.5 km	MPC · JPL
380051	2013 RC_{72}	—	October 27, 2005	Mount Lemmon	Mount Lemmon Survey	·	1.3 km	MPC · JPL
380052	2013 RR_{72}	—	April 29, 2003	Kitt Peak	Spacewatch	·	2.2 km	MPC · JPL
380053	2013 RU_{72}	—	January 6, 2010	Kitt Peak	Spacewatch	·	4.9 km	MPC · JPL
380054	2013 RN_{73}	—	March 25, 2004	Siding Spring	SSS	·	3.1 km	MPC · JPL
380055	2013 RV_{74}	—	August 22, 2003	Campo Imperatore	CINEOS	·	2.2 km	MPC · JPL
380056	2013 RW_{74}	—	October 2, 1999	Kitt Peak	Spacewatch	·	1.9 km	MPC · JPL
380057	2013 RF_{81}	—	October 1, 1999	Kitt Peak	Spacewatch	·	2.0 km	MPC · JPL
380058	2013 RB_{82}	—	November 24, 2009	Catalina	CSS	·	2.6 km	MPC · JPL
380059	2013 RU_{83}	—	December 16, 2007	Mount Lemmon	Mount Lemmon Survey	·	750 m	MPC · JPL
380060	2013 RG_{92}	—	October 22, 2008	Kitt Peak	Spacewatch	·	2.7 km	MPC · JPL
380061	2013 RE_{94}	—	March 8, 2005	Mount Lemmon	Mount Lemmon Survey	·	4.5 km	MPC · JPL
380062	2013 SC_{10}	—	October 30, 2000	Socorro	LINEAR	·	2.0 km	MPC · JPL
380063	2013 SO_{15}	—	December 9, 2004	Kitt Peak	Spacewatch	KOR	1.5 km	MPC · JPL
380064	2013 SS_{18}	—	June 16, 2007	Kitt Peak	Spacewatch	·	3.2 km	MPC · JPL
380065	2013 SE_{22}	—	March 14, 2007	Kitt Peak	Spacewatch	AGN	1.1 km	MPC · JPL
380066	2013 SQ_{22}	—	October 5, 1996	Kitt Peak	Spacewatch	·	1.6 km	MPC · JPL
380067	2013 ST_{25}	—	November 29, 2000	Kitt Peak	Spacewatch	·	2.2 km	MPC · JPL
380068	2013 SK_{26}	—	April 4, 2005	Catalina	CSS	·	5.1 km	MPC · JPL
380069	2013 SK_{27}	—	October 14, 2001	Socorro	LINEAR	·	1.8 km	MPC · JPL
380070	2013 SG_{28}	—	January 11, 2002	Anderson Mesa	LONEOS	·	3.1 km	MPC · JPL
380071	2013 ST_{29}	—	February 3, 2006	Mount Lemmon	Mount Lemmon Survey	·	2.1 km	MPC · JPL
380072	2013 SV_{29}	—	December 27, 2005	Mount Lemmon	Mount Lemmon Survey	·	1.5 km	MPC · JPL
380073	2013 SK_{30}	—	June 21, 2004	Socorro	LINEAR	·	1.8 km	MPC · JPL
380074	2013 SN_{31}	—	November 17, 2009	Kitt Peak	Spacewatch	·	1.7 km	MPC · JPL
380075	2013 SR_{31}	—	April 7, 2008	Kitt Peak	Spacewatch	·	1.5 km	MPC · JPL
380076	2013 SF_{33}	—	November 8, 2008	Mount Lemmon	Mount Lemmon Survey	EOS	2.5 km	MPC · JPL
380077	2013 SR_{36}	—	September 11, 2004	Kitt Peak	Spacewatch	·	1.8 km	MPC · JPL
380078	2013 SL_{37}	—	February 3, 2000	Kitt Peak	Spacewatch	·	1.4 km	MPC · JPL
380079	2013 SY_{39}	—	October 22, 2005	Kitt Peak	Spacewatch	·	1.2 km	MPC · JPL
380080	2013 SH_{40}	—	September 28, 2006	Catalina	CSS	·	1.4 km	MPC · JPL
380081	2013 SQ_{40}	—	October 31, 2000	Socorro	LINEAR	H	600 m	MPC · JPL
380082	2013 SS_{40}	—	August 31, 2000	Socorro	LINEAR	·	1.7 km	MPC · JPL
380083	2013 SA_{44}	—	October 5, 1996	Kitt Peak	Spacewatch	VER	3.2 km	MPC · JPL
380084	2013 SK_{48}	—	November 23, 2009	Kitt Peak	Spacewatch	·	2.6 km	MPC · JPL
380085	2013 SA_{51}	—	February 27, 2006	Kitt Peak	Spacewatch	KOR	1.7 km	MPC · JPL
380086	2013 SE_{51}	—	March 10, 2002	Kitt Peak	Spacewatch	·	2.1 km	MPC · JPL
380087	2013 SJ_{51}	—	March 13, 2007	Mount Lemmon	Mount Lemmon Survey	·	1.1 km	MPC · JPL
380088	2013 SU_{51}	—	November 8, 2007	Mount Lemmon	Mount Lemmon Survey	·	930 m	MPC · JPL
380089	2013 SG_{52}	—	March 25, 2007	Mount Lemmon	Mount Lemmon Survey	·	2.0 km	MPC · JPL
380090	2013 SW_{54}	—	November 8, 2007	Kitt Peak	Spacewatch	·	650 m	MPC · JPL
380091	2013 SH_{57}	—	October 17, 1977	Palomar	C. J. van Houten, I. van Houten-Groeneveld, T. Gehrels	·	690 m	MPC · JPL
380092	2013 SG_{59}	—	December 5, 2002	Socorro	LINEAR	·	1.4 km	MPC · JPL
380093	2013 TS	—	April 25, 2007	Kitt Peak	Spacewatch	·	2.2 km	MPC · JPL
380094	2013 TB_{1}	—	December 2, 2005	Mount Lemmon	Mount Lemmon Survey	·	2.8 km	MPC · JPL
380095	2013 TK_{3}	—	September 15, 2004	Kitt Peak	Spacewatch	·	2.1 km	MPC · JPL
380096	2013 TR_{6}	—	April 11, 2008	Mount Lemmon	Mount Lemmon Survey	·	1.3 km	MPC · JPL
380097	2013 TW_{6}	—	November 3, 2008	Mount Lemmon	Mount Lemmon Survey	·	5.1 km	MPC · JPL
380098	2013 TW_{7}	—	November 7, 2008	Mount Lemmon	Mount Lemmon Survey	·	3.6 km	MPC · JPL
380099	2013 TT_{8}	—	September 24, 2000	Socorro	LINEAR	·	1.4 km	MPC · JPL
380100	2013 TP_{10}	—	February 4, 2000	Kitt Peak	Spacewatch	NYS	1.3 km	MPC · JPL

== 380101–380200 ==
back to top

Designation			Discovery			Properties		Ref
Permanent	Provisional	Named after	Date	Site	Discoverer(s)	Category	Diam.	Ref
380101	2013 TP_{11}	—	December 25, 2000	Kitt Peak	Spacewatch	·	4.2 km	MPC · JPL
380102	2013 TX_{11}	—	September 18, 2004	Socorro	LINEAR	·	2.2 km	MPC · JPL
380103	2013 TD_{14}	—	March 19, 2004	Socorro	LINEAR	H	620 m	MPC · JPL
380104	2013 TV_{18}	—	April 30, 2006	Kitt Peak	Spacewatch	·	3.0 km	MPC · JPL
380105	2013 TS_{23}	—	December 21, 2000	Kitt Peak	Spacewatch	·	2.3 km	MPC · JPL
380106	2013 TB_{25}	—	February 29, 2008	Kitt Peak	Spacewatch	·	1.5 km	MPC · JPL
380107	2013 TD_{30}	—	December 23, 2000	Apache Point	SDSS	·	2.6 km	MPC · JPL
380108	2013 TR_{30}	—	November 26, 2009	Mount Lemmon	Mount Lemmon Survey	(5)	1.4 km	MPC · JPL
380109	2013 TS_{32}	—	September 5, 2000	Socorro	LINEAR	·	1.3 km	MPC · JPL
380110	2013 TF_{36}	—	April 28, 2007	Kitt Peak	Spacewatch	·	2.3 km	MPC · JPL
380111	2013 TO_{43}	—	September 19, 2003	Socorro	LINEAR	·	860 m	MPC · JPL
380112	2013 TR_{46}	—	October 10, 2008	Mount Lemmon	Mount Lemmon Survey	KOR	1.4 km	MPC · JPL
380113	2013 TH_{51}	—	March 26, 2006	Kitt Peak	Spacewatch	·	760 m	MPC · JPL
380114	2013 TN_{65}	—	September 6, 2008	Mount Lemmon	Mount Lemmon Survey	EOS	2.1 km	MPC · JPL
380115	1994 UJ_{8}	—	October 28, 1994	Kitt Peak	Spacewatch	·	2.5 km	MPC · JPL
380116	1995 OH_{5}	—	July 22, 1995	Kitt Peak	Spacewatch	·	850 m	MPC · JPL
380117	1995 SJ_{40}	—	September 25, 1995	Kitt Peak	Spacewatch	·	2.5 km	MPC · JPL
380118	1995 UJ_{12}	—	October 17, 1995	Kitt Peak	Spacewatch	·	1.7 km	MPC · JPL
380119	1995 VS_{17}	—	November 15, 1995	Kitt Peak	Spacewatch	·	1.8 km	MPC · JPL
380120	1995 YQ_{4}	—	December 16, 1995	Kitt Peak	Spacewatch	JUN	1.6 km	MPC · JPL
380121	1996 AH_{12}	—	January 15, 1996	Kitt Peak	Spacewatch	·	900 m	MPC · JPL
380122	1996 AZ_{15}	—	January 12, 1996	Kitt Peak	Spacewatch	·	1.4 km	MPC · JPL
380123	1996 RL_{7}	—	September 5, 1996	Kitt Peak	Spacewatch	·	660 m	MPC · JPL
380124	1996 RW_{10}	—	September 8, 1996	Kitt Peak	Spacewatch	·	1.1 km	MPC · JPL
380125	1996 UC_{1}	—	October 18, 1996	Haleakala	NEAT	·	700 m	MPC · JPL
380126	1996 XU_{4}	—	December 6, 1996	Kitt Peak	Spacewatch	·	2.9 km	MPC · JPL
380127	1997 WW_{9}	—	November 21, 1997	Kitt Peak	Spacewatch	·	880 m	MPC · JPL
380128	1997 WB_{21}	—	November 26, 1997	Haleakala	NEAT	APO	310 m	MPC · JPL
380129	1998 HB_{7}	—	April 23, 1998	Socorro	LINEAR	·	3.1 km	MPC · JPL
380130	1998 RS_{53}	—	September 14, 1998	Socorro	LINEAR	·	1.4 km	MPC · JPL
380131	1998 SZ_{77}	—	September 26, 1998	Socorro	LINEAR	·	2.0 km	MPC · JPL
380132	1998 TL_{3}	—	October 14, 1998	Socorro	LINEAR	·	1.8 km	MPC · JPL
380133	1998 UX_{24}	—	October 27, 1998	Kitt Peak	Spacewatch	·	240 m	MPC · JPL
380134	1999 JX_{11}	—	May 12, 1999	Socorro	LINEAR	PHO	1.3 km	MPC · JPL
380135	1999 RL_{7}	—	September 3, 1999	Kitt Peak	Spacewatch	·	3.3 km	MPC · JPL
380136	1999 RQ_{58}	—	September 7, 1999	Socorro	LINEAR	·	2.6 km	MPC · JPL
380137	1999 RK_{207}	—	September 8, 1999	Socorro	LINEAR	·	2.9 km	MPC · JPL
380138	1999 TO_{30}	—	October 4, 1999	Socorro	LINEAR	·	740 m	MPC · JPL
380139	1999 TS_{78}	—	October 11, 1999	Kitt Peak	Spacewatch	·	1.5 km	MPC · JPL
380140	1999 TH_{119}	—	October 4, 1999	Socorro	LINEAR	·	2.6 km	MPC · JPL
380141	1999 TO_{239}	—	October 4, 1999	Catalina	CSS	·	2.7 km	MPC · JPL
380142	1999 TT_{321}	—	October 12, 1999	Kitt Peak	Spacewatch	·	1.7 km	MPC · JPL
380143	1999 UH_{3}	—	October 19, 1999	Bergisch Gladbach	W. Bickel	·	2.8 km	MPC · JPL
380144	1999 UX_{9}	—	October 31, 1999	Socorro	LINEAR	·	1.5 km	MPC · JPL
380145	1999 UH_{31}	—	October 31, 1999	Kitt Peak	Spacewatch	·	1.4 km	MPC · JPL
380146	1999 UD_{48}	—	October 30, 1999	Catalina	CSS	·	2.3 km	MPC · JPL
380147	1999 UR_{60}	—	October 31, 1999	Socorro	LINEAR	·	2.2 km	MPC · JPL
380148	1999 VD_{18}	—	November 2, 1999	Kitt Peak	Spacewatch	·	2.6 km	MPC · JPL
380149	1999 VK_{79}	—	November 4, 1999	Socorro	LINEAR	·	2.0 km	MPC · JPL
380150	1999 VG_{125}	—	November 6, 1999	Kitt Peak	Spacewatch	GEF	1.5 km	MPC · JPL
380151	1999 VN_{202}	—	November 5, 1999	Kitt Peak	Spacewatch	·	2.0 km	MPC · JPL
380152	1999 YO_{4}	—	December 28, 1999	Socorro	LINEAR	·	1.5 km	MPC · JPL
380153	2000 AV_{39}	—	January 3, 2000	Socorro	LINEAR	·	1.0 km	MPC · JPL
380154	2000 AO_{49}	—	January 5, 2000	Socorro	LINEAR	PHO	1.4 km	MPC · JPL
380155	2000 AO_{146}	—	January 7, 2000	Socorro	LINEAR	PHO	1.7 km	MPC · JPL
380156	2000 BX_{20}	—	January 28, 2000	Kitt Peak	Spacewatch	·	1.1 km	MPC · JPL
380157	2000 BW_{21}	—	January 29, 2000	Kitt Peak	Spacewatch	·	1.3 km	MPC · JPL
380158	2000 EJ_{51}	—	March 3, 2000	Kitt Peak	Spacewatch	·	1.5 km	MPC · JPL
380159	2000 HR_{49}	—	April 29, 2000	Socorro	LINEAR	·	2.2 km	MPC · JPL
380160	2000 JO_{78}	—	May 10, 2000	Socorro	LINEAR	AMO +1km · slow	990 m	MPC · JPL
380161	2000 LD_{16}	—	June 7, 2000	Socorro	LINEAR	·	1.6 km	MPC · JPL
380162	2000 PB_{9}	—	August 6, 2000	Siding Spring	R. H. McNaught	·	3.4 km	MPC · JPL
380163	2000 QG_{59}	—	August 26, 2000	Socorro	LINEAR	·	1.6 km	MPC · JPL
380164	2000 QF_{73}	—	August 24, 2000	Socorro	LINEAR	EUN	1.6 km	MPC · JPL
380165	2000 QK_{82}	—	August 24, 2000	Socorro	LINEAR	(5)	1.4 km	MPC · JPL
380166	2000 QM_{115}	—	August 25, 2000	Socorro	LINEAR	(5)	1.4 km	MPC · JPL
380167	2000 QF_{137}	—	August 31, 2000	Socorro	LINEAR	EUN	1.8 km	MPC · JPL
380168	2000 QQ_{168}	—	August 31, 2000	Socorro	LINEAR	EUN	2.0 km	MPC · JPL
380169	2000 QD_{195}	—	August 26, 2000	Socorro	LINEAR	·	1.3 km	MPC · JPL
380170	2000 QJ_{210}	—	August 31, 2000	Socorro	LINEAR	·	1.4 km	MPC · JPL
380171	2000 RK_{20}	—	September 1, 2000	Socorro	LINEAR	·	1.5 km	MPC · JPL
380172	2000 RF_{96}	—	September 4, 2000	Haleakala	NEAT	·	2.1 km	MPC · JPL
380173	2000 SB_{11}	—	September 5, 2000	Anderson Mesa	LONEOS	(194)	1.7 km	MPC · JPL
380174	2000 SW_{17}	—	September 23, 2000	Socorro	LINEAR	·	1.5 km	MPC · JPL
380175	2000 SY_{29}	—	September 24, 2000	Socorro	LINEAR	·	1.4 km	MPC · JPL
380176	2000 SC_{30}	—	September 24, 2000	Socorro	LINEAR	·	880 m	MPC · JPL
380177	2000 SO_{51}	—	September 23, 2000	Socorro	LINEAR	(5)	1.8 km	MPC · JPL
380178	2000 SO_{91}	—	September 23, 2000	Socorro	LINEAR	EUN	1.5 km	MPC · JPL
380179	2000 SL_{114}	—	September 24, 2000	Socorro	LINEAR	·	1.5 km	MPC · JPL
380180	2000 SQ_{138}	—	September 23, 2000	Socorro	LINEAR	·	1.9 km	MPC · JPL
380181	2000 SJ_{149}	—	September 24, 2000	Socorro	LINEAR	·	1.6 km	MPC · JPL
380182	2000 SN_{157}	—	September 27, 2000	Socorro	LINEAR	·	1.8 km	MPC · JPL
380183	2000 SH_{284}	—	September 23, 2000	Socorro	LINEAR	·	1.4 km	MPC · JPL
380184	2000 SE_{291}	—	September 27, 2000	Socorro	LINEAR	·	1.5 km	MPC · JPL
380185	2000 SD_{295}	—	September 27, 2000	Socorro	LINEAR	·	3.5 km	MPC · JPL
380186	2000 ST_{311}	—	September 27, 2000	Socorro	LINEAR	·	1.9 km	MPC · JPL
380187	2000 WH_{2}	—	November 16, 2000	Socorro	LINEAR	·	2.0 km	MPC · JPL
380188	2000 WC_{67}	—	November 26, 2000	Socorro	LINEAR	AMO +1km	1.3 km	MPC · JPL
380189	2000 WA_{70}	—	November 19, 2000	Socorro	LINEAR	·	2.1 km	MPC · JPL
380190	2000 WL_{80}	—	November 20, 2000	Socorro	LINEAR	·	1.6 km	MPC · JPL
380191	2000 WK_{93}	—	November 21, 2000	Socorro	LINEAR	·	1.6 km	MPC · JPL
380192	2000 WM_{134}	—	November 19, 2000	Socorro	LINEAR	EUN ·	2.6 km	MPC · JPL
380193	2000 WC_{172}	—	November 25, 2000	Socorro	LINEAR	·	2.1 km	MPC · JPL
380194	2000 WJ_{172}	—	November 25, 2000	Socorro	LINEAR	(1547)	1.8 km	MPC · JPL
380195	2000 XE_{16}	—	December 1, 2000	Socorro	LINEAR	JUN	1.4 km	MPC · JPL
380196	2000 XH_{20}	—	December 4, 2000	Socorro	LINEAR	·	4.8 km	MPC · JPL
380197	2000 YD_{27}	—	December 26, 2000	Kitt Peak	Spacewatch	·	2.8 km	MPC · JPL
380198	2000 YZ_{27}	—	December 27, 2000	Anderson Mesa	LONEOS	·	2.0 km	MPC · JPL
380199	2000 YQ_{29}	—	December 28, 2000	Socorro	LINEAR	·	1.5 km	MPC · JPL
380200	2000 YL_{56}	—	December 30, 2000	Socorro	LINEAR	JUN	1.2 km	MPC · JPL

== 380201–380300 ==
back to top

Designation			Discovery			Properties		Ref
Permanent	Provisional	Named after	Date	Site	Discoverer(s)	Category	Diam.	Ref
380201	2000 YH_{111}	—	December 30, 2000	Socorro	LINEAR	·	2.1 km	MPC · JPL
380202	2001 AL_{12}	—	January 2, 2001	Socorro	LINEAR	·	2.2 km	MPC · JPL
380203	2001 BE_{7}	—	January 19, 2001	Socorro	LINEAR	·	2.3 km	MPC · JPL
380204	2001 CS_{25}	—	February 1, 2001	Socorro	LINEAR	·	3.2 km	MPC · JPL
380205	2001 CA_{32}	—	February 5, 2001	Socorro	LINEAR	AMO	470 m	MPC · JPL
380206	2001 DK_{8}	—	February 18, 2001	Haleakala	NEAT	H	870 m	MPC · JPL
380207	2001 EV_{22}	—	March 15, 2001	Kitt Peak	Spacewatch	·	2.8 km	MPC · JPL
380208	2001 FH_{30}	—	March 20, 2001	Haleakala	NEAT	·	2.2 km	MPC · JPL
380209	2001 FZ_{43}	—	March 18, 2001	Socorro	LINEAR	·	3.0 km	MPC · JPL
380210	2001 HP_{4}	—	April 18, 2001	Socorro	LINEAR	PHO	1.4 km	MPC · JPL
380211	2001 HT_{45}	—	April 17, 2001	Anderson Mesa	LONEOS	·	2.6 km	MPC · JPL
380212	2001 OA_{30}	—	July 19, 2001	Palomar	NEAT	·	3.0 km	MPC · JPL
380213	2001 OX_{66}	—	July 23, 2001	Haleakala	NEAT	PHO	1.4 km	MPC · JPL
380214	2001 PW_{32}	—	August 10, 2001	Palomar	NEAT	·	3.4 km	MPC · JPL
380215	2001 QP_{47}	—	August 16, 2001	Socorro	LINEAR	TIR	3.1 km	MPC · JPL
380216	2001 QQ_{188}	—	August 22, 2001	Kitt Peak	Spacewatch	MAS	850 m	MPC · JPL
380217	2001 QP_{195}	—	August 22, 2001	Socorro	LINEAR	PHO	1.3 km	MPC · JPL
380218	2001 QM_{266}	—	August 20, 2001	Socorro	LINEAR	PHO	2.7 km	MPC · JPL
380219	2001 QN_{330}	—	August 25, 2001	Socorro	LINEAR	·	3.5 km	MPC · JPL
380220	2001 QT_{330}	—	August 27, 2001	Anderson Mesa	LONEOS	·	1.2 km	MPC · JPL
380221	2001 RQ_{38}	—	September 8, 2001	Socorro	LINEAR	·	3.8 km	MPC · JPL
380222	2001 RJ_{54}	—	September 12, 2001	Socorro	LINEAR	T_{j} (2.99) · EUP	4.0 km	MPC · JPL
380223	2001 RZ_{63}	—	September 10, 2001	Socorro	LINEAR	·	950 m	MPC · JPL
380224	2001 RY_{117}	—	September 12, 2001	Socorro	LINEAR	MAS	830 m	MPC · JPL
380225	2001 RB_{141}	—	September 12, 2001	Socorro	LINEAR	·	1.7 km	MPC · JPL
380226	2001 RB_{145}	—	September 7, 2001	Palomar	NEAT	·	1.7 km	MPC · JPL
380227	2001 SN_{24}	—	September 16, 2001	Socorro	LINEAR	T_{j} (2.98) · EUP	3.5 km	MPC · JPL
380228	2001 SU_{125}	—	September 16, 2001	Socorro	LINEAR	·	3.6 km	MPC · JPL
380229	2001 SQ_{132}	—	September 16, 2001	Socorro	LINEAR	·	1.6 km	MPC · JPL
380230	2001 SP_{144}	—	September 16, 2001	Socorro	LINEAR	·	4.8 km	MPC · JPL
380231	2001 SG_{147}	—	September 16, 2001	Socorro	LINEAR	·	1.2 km	MPC · JPL
380232	2001 SM_{163}	—	September 17, 2001	Socorro	LINEAR	·	1.5 km	MPC · JPL
380233	2001 SE_{188}	—	September 19, 2001	Socorro	LINEAR	·	1.3 km	MPC · JPL
380234	2001 SE_{198}	—	September 19, 2001	Socorro	LINEAR	·	1.3 km	MPC · JPL
380235	2001 SC_{302}	—	September 20, 2001	Socorro	LINEAR	·	3.9 km	MPC · JPL
380236	2001 TY_{16}	—	October 12, 2001	Campo Imperatore	CINEOS	·	4.3 km	MPC · JPL
380237	2001 TX_{56}	—	October 13, 2001	Palomar	NEAT	·	1.0 km	MPC · JPL
380238	2001 TY_{140}	—	October 10, 2001	Palomar	NEAT	NYS	1.2 km	MPC · JPL
380239	2001 TV_{253}	—	October 14, 2001	Apache Point	SDSS	·	2.7 km	MPC · JPL
380240	2001 UA_{2}	—	October 17, 2001	Socorro	LINEAR	·	920 m	MPC · JPL
380241	2001 UW_{11}	—	October 23, 2001	Desert Eagle	W. K. Y. Yeung	·	3.6 km	MPC · JPL
380242	2001 UR_{31}	—	October 16, 2001	Socorro	LINEAR	·	2.0 km	MPC · JPL
380243	2001 UX_{32}	—	October 16, 2001	Socorro	LINEAR	·	2.1 km	MPC · JPL
380244	2001 UA_{73}	—	October 16, 2001	Socorro	LINEAR	·	1.6 km	MPC · JPL
380245	2001 UO_{125}	—	October 22, 2001	Palomar	NEAT	·	4.0 km	MPC · JPL
380246	2001 UD_{175}	—	October 24, 2001	Palomar	NEAT	NYS	1.6 km	MPC · JPL
380247	2001 UT_{178}	—	October 23, 2001	Palomar	NEAT	LIX	4.6 km	MPC · JPL
380248	2001 UC_{190}	—	October 18, 2001	Palomar	NEAT	·	1.1 km	MPC · JPL
380249	2001 US_{209}	—	October 20, 2001	Haleakala	NEAT	TIR	3.5 km	MPC · JPL
380250	2001 VF_{81}	—	November 11, 2001	Palomar	NEAT	·	2.4 km	MPC · JPL
380251	2001 WW_{45}	—	November 19, 2001	Socorro	LINEAR	·	1.6 km	MPC · JPL
380252	2001 WL_{60}	—	October 21, 2001	Socorro	LINEAR	HYG	3.5 km	MPC · JPL
380253	2001 WU_{70}	—	November 20, 2001	Socorro	LINEAR	·	1.6 km	MPC · JPL
380254	2001 WB_{87}	—	November 18, 2001	Socorro	LINEAR	·	1.5 km	MPC · JPL
380255	2001 XJ_{26}	—	December 10, 2001	Socorro	LINEAR	·	2.4 km	MPC · JPL
380256	2001 XL_{43}	—	December 9, 2001	Socorro	LINEAR	·	2.2 km	MPC · JPL
380257	2001 XN_{115}	—	December 13, 2001	Socorro	LINEAR	·	1.1 km	MPC · JPL
380258	2001 XU_{129}	—	December 14, 2001	Socorro	LINEAR	·	1.1 km	MPC · JPL
380259	2001 XN_{160}	—	December 14, 2001	Socorro	LINEAR	·	1.1 km	MPC · JPL
380260	2001 XB_{229}	—	December 15, 2001	Socorro	LINEAR	·	1.5 km	MPC · JPL
380261	2001 XU_{241}	—	November 20, 2001	Socorro	LINEAR	·	4.3 km	MPC · JPL
380262	2001 XV_{262}	—	December 13, 2001	Palomar	NEAT	·	900 m	MPC · JPL
380263	2001 YZ_{10}	—	December 17, 2001	Socorro	LINEAR	EUN	1.3 km	MPC · JPL
380264	2001 YA_{30}	—	December 18, 2001	Socorro	LINEAR	·	970 m	MPC · JPL
380265	2001 YR_{31}	—	December 18, 2001	Socorro	LINEAR	·	1.1 km	MPC · JPL
380266	2001 YU_{47}	—	December 18, 2001	Socorro	LINEAR	·	1.8 km	MPC · JPL
380267	2001 YM_{68}	—	December 18, 2001	Socorro	LINEAR	·	2.4 km	MPC · JPL
380268	2001 YQ_{71}	—	December 18, 2001	Socorro	LINEAR	·	1.3 km	MPC · JPL
380269	2001 YE_{113}	—	December 17, 2001	Kitt Peak	Spacewatch	·	1.2 km	MPC · JPL
380270	2001 YX_{138}	—	December 22, 2001	Kitt Peak	Spacewatch	MAR	1.2 km	MPC · JPL
380271	2001 YH_{139}	—	December 24, 2001	Haleakala	NEAT	·	1.3 km	MPC · JPL
380272	2002 AC_{11}	—	January 12, 2002	Oizumi	T. Kobayashi	·	1.5 km	MPC · JPL
380273	2002 AB_{44}	—	January 9, 2002	Socorro	LINEAR	(5)	1.8 km	MPC · JPL
380274	2002 AE_{46}	—	January 9, 2002	Socorro	LINEAR	·	1.3 km	MPC · JPL
380275	2002 AL_{65}	—	January 11, 2002	Socorro	LINEAR	·	2.6 km	MPC · JPL
380276	2002 AD_{68}	—	January 9, 2002	Kitt Peak	Spacewatch	·	2.0 km	MPC · JPL
380277	2002 AO_{69}	—	January 8, 2002	Socorro	LINEAR	·	3.1 km	MPC · JPL
380278	2002 AP_{102}	—	January 8, 2002	Socorro	LINEAR	·	1.9 km	MPC · JPL
380279	2002 AR_{102}	—	January 8, 2002	Socorro	LINEAR	·	2.4 km	MPC · JPL
380280	2002 AX_{131}	—	January 8, 2002	Socorro	LINEAR	·	3.1 km	MPC · JPL
380281	2002 AW_{142}	—	January 13, 2002	Socorro	LINEAR	(5)	1.3 km	MPC · JPL
380282	2002 AO_{148}	—	January 11, 2002	Socorro	LINEAR	T_{j} (2.82)	10 km	MPC · JPL
380283	2002 AM_{156}	—	January 13, 2002	Socorro	LINEAR	·	1.2 km	MPC · JPL
380284	2002 AJ_{167}	—	January 13, 2002	Socorro	LINEAR	JUN	1.4 km	MPC · JPL
380285	2002 AQ_{169}	—	January 14, 2002	Socorro	LINEAR	·	2.5 km	MPC · JPL
380286	2002 BG_{23}	—	January 23, 2002	Socorro	LINEAR	·	1.6 km	MPC · JPL
380287	2002 BF_{30}	—	January 22, 2002	Kitt Peak	Spacewatch	·	970 m	MPC · JPL
380288	2002 BC_{31}	—	January 19, 2002	Socorro	LINEAR	RAF	970 m	MPC · JPL
380289	2002 CQ_{4}	—	February 5, 2002	Oaxaca	Roe, J. M.	·	2.4 km	MPC · JPL
380290	2002 CF_{34}	—	February 6, 2002	Socorro	LINEAR	·	1.9 km	MPC · JPL
380291	2002 CO_{66}	—	February 7, 2002	Socorro	LINEAR	ADE	2.8 km	MPC · JPL
380292	2002 CD_{84}	—	February 7, 2002	Socorro	LINEAR	·	1.3 km	MPC · JPL
380293	2002 CK_{143}	—	February 9, 2002	Socorro	LINEAR	·	1.6 km	MPC · JPL
380294	2002 CT_{172}	—	February 8, 2002	Socorro	LINEAR	·	1.1 km	MPC · JPL
380295	2002 CS_{186}	—	February 10, 2002	Socorro	LINEAR	(5)	1.1 km	MPC · JPL
380296	2002 CU_{199}	—	February 10, 2002	Socorro	LINEAR	·	1.3 km	MPC · JPL
380297	2002 CD_{205}	—	February 10, 2002	Socorro	LINEAR	·	1.1 km	MPC · JPL
380298	2002 CS_{208}	—	February 10, 2002	Socorro	LINEAR	·	1.1 km	MPC · JPL
380299	2002 CB_{247}	—	February 15, 2002	Socorro	LINEAR	·	1.9 km	MPC · JPL
380300	2002 CY_{252}	—	February 5, 2002	Anderson Mesa	LONEOS	·	1.0 km	MPC · JPL

== 380301–380400 ==
back to top

Designation			Discovery			Properties		Ref
Permanent	Provisional	Named after	Date	Site	Discoverer(s)	Category	Diam.	Ref
380301	2002 CV_{254}	—	February 6, 2002	Anderson Mesa	LONEOS	·	3.8 km	MPC · JPL
380302	2002 CT_{269}	—	January 14, 2002	Kitt Peak	Spacewatch	·	1.7 km	MPC · JPL
380303	2002 CO_{288}	—	February 10, 2002	Socorro	LINEAR	·	1.3 km	MPC · JPL
380304	2002 CJ_{290}	—	February 10, 2002	Socorro	LINEAR	·	2.1 km	MPC · JPL
380305	2002 DL_{6}	—	February 20, 2002	Kitt Peak	Spacewatch	·	1.1 km	MPC · JPL
380306	2002 EM_{18}	—	March 9, 2002	Kitt Peak	Spacewatch	·	2.8 km	MPC · JPL
380307	2002 EL_{23}	—	March 5, 2002	Kitt Peak	Spacewatch	L4	10 km	MPC · JPL
380308	2002 ED_{93}	—	March 14, 2002	Socorro	LINEAR	·	1.3 km	MPC · JPL
380309	2002 ED_{104}	—	March 9, 2002	Anderson Mesa	LONEOS	·	2.1 km	MPC · JPL
380310	2002 ET_{106}	—	March 9, 2002	Anderson Mesa	LONEOS	·	2.2 km	MPC · JPL
380311	2002 EO_{121}	—	March 11, 2002	Palomar	NEAT	·	1.9 km	MPC · JPL
380312	2002 FZ_{25}	—	March 19, 2002	Palomar	NEAT	·	1.6 km	MPC · JPL
380313	2002 GQ_{26}	—	April 11, 2002	Palomar	NEAT	·	3.7 km	MPC · JPL
380314	2002 GU_{40}	—	April 4, 2002	Palomar	NEAT	·	930 m	MPC · JPL
380315	2002 GA_{74}	—	April 9, 2002	Palomar	NEAT	·	2.9 km	MPC · JPL
380316	2002 GW_{78}	—	April 9, 2002	Kvistaberg	Uppsala-DLR Asteroid Survey	·	940 m	MPC · JPL
380317	2002 GA_{81}	—	April 10, 2002	Socorro	LINEAR	·	1.9 km	MPC · JPL
380318	2002 GW_{128}	—	April 12, 2002	Socorro	LINEAR	·	1.7 km	MPC · JPL
380319	2002 GU_{172}	—	April 10, 2002	Socorro	LINEAR	·	1.5 km	MPC · JPL
380320	2002 GF_{178}	—	April 12, 2002	Palomar	M. Meyer	AEO	1.1 km	MPC · JPL
380321	2002 HF_{8}	—	April 19, 2002	Kitt Peak	Spacewatch	AMO +1km	790 m	MPC · JPL
380322	2002 HR_{11}	—	April 22, 2002	Socorro	LINEAR	·	2.2 km	MPC · JPL
380323	2002 JN_{6}	—	May 6, 2002	Kitt Peak	Spacewatch	·	2.2 km	MPC · JPL
380324	2002 JV_{6}	—	May 6, 2002	Kitt Peak	Spacewatch	·	2.4 km	MPC · JPL
380325	2002 JT_{41}	—	May 8, 2002	Socorro	LINEAR	PHO	980 m	MPC · JPL
380326	2002 JC_{125}	—	May 7, 2002	Socorro	LINEAR	ADE	2.6 km	MPC · JPL
380327	2002 LO_{5}	—	June 5, 2002	Kitt Peak	Spacewatch	·	1.9 km	MPC · JPL
380328	2002 NK_{58}	—	July 9, 2002	Palomar	NEAT	·	2.4 km	MPC · JPL
380329	2002 OR_{8}	—	July 19, 2002	Palomar	NEAT	(2076)	710 m	MPC · JPL
380330	2002 OF_{12}	—	July 18, 2002	Socorro	LINEAR	·	6.0 km	MPC · JPL
380331	2002 OA_{17}	—	July 18, 2002	Socorro	LINEAR	·	1.4 km	MPC · JPL
380332	2002 ON_{30}	—	July 18, 2002	Palomar	NEAT	·	740 m	MPC · JPL
380333	2002 PX_{23}	—	August 6, 2002	Palomar	NEAT	·	640 m	MPC · JPL
380334	2002 PZ_{87}	—	August 12, 2002	Socorro	LINEAR	·	1.9 km	MPC · JPL
380335	2002 PB_{113}	—	August 12, 2002	Socorro	LINEAR	H	540 m	MPC · JPL
380336	2002 PN_{141}	—	August 15, 2002	Socorro	LINEAR	H	810 m	MPC · JPL
380337	2002 PY_{184}	—	August 11, 2002	Palomar	NEAT	·	670 m	MPC · JPL
380338	2002 PT_{190}	—	August 15, 2002	Palomar	NEAT	·	700 m	MPC · JPL
380339	2002 PT_{201}	—	June 26, 1997	Kitt Peak	Spacewatch	·	2.9 km	MPC · JPL
380340	2002 QG_{65}	—	August 17, 2002	Palomar	NEAT	·	990 m	MPC · JPL
380341	2002 QN_{81}	—	August 30, 2002	Palomar	NEAT	·	2.3 km	MPC · JPL
380342	2002 QN_{96}	—	August 18, 2002	Palomar	NEAT	·	1.0 km	MPC · JPL
380343	2002 QO_{102}	—	August 28, 2002	Palomar	NEAT	·	780 m	MPC · JPL
380344	2002 QY_{104}	—	August 26, 2002	Palomar	NEAT	·	2.0 km	MPC · JPL
380345	2002 QK_{112}	—	August 17, 2002	Palomar	NEAT	·	2.8 km	MPC · JPL
380346	2002 QH_{117}	—	August 16, 2002	Palomar	NEAT	·	2.0 km	MPC · JPL
380347	2002 QZ_{137}	—	August 17, 2002	Palomar	NEAT	·	580 m	MPC · JPL
380348	2002 RB_{43}	—	September 5, 2002	Socorro	LINEAR	·	1.0 km	MPC · JPL
380349	2002 RH_{151}	—	September 12, 2002	Palomar	NEAT	·	2.6 km	MPC · JPL
380350	2002 RP_{193}	—	September 12, 2002	Palomar	NEAT	·	2.2 km	MPC · JPL
380351	2002 RD_{217}	—	September 14, 2002	Palomar	NEAT	·	800 m	MPC · JPL
380352	2002 RS_{227}	—	September 14, 2002	Palomar	NEAT	·	2.2 km	MPC · JPL
380353	2002 RJ_{247}	—	September 1, 2002	Palomar	NEAT	KOR	1.8 km	MPC · JPL
380354	2002 RG_{256}	—	September 4, 2002	Palomar	NEAT	·	900 m	MPC · JPL
380355	2002 RH_{282}	—	September 4, 2002	Palomar	NEAT	·	710 m	MPC · JPL
380356	2002 SE_{13}	—	September 27, 2002	Palomar	NEAT	H	720 m	MPC · JPL
380357	2002 TD_{17}	—	October 2, 2002	Socorro	LINEAR	·	1.3 km	MPC · JPL
380358	2002 TB_{24}	—	October 2, 2002	Socorro	LINEAR	NYS	1.0 km	MPC · JPL
380359	2002 TN_{30}	—	October 2, 2002	Socorro	LINEAR	AMO +1km	1.2 km	MPC · JPL
380360	2002 TN_{62}	—	October 3, 2002	Campo Imperatore	CINEOS	·	2.8 km	MPC · JPL
380361	2002 TV_{85}	—	October 2, 2002	Campo Imperatore	CINEOS	EOS	2.3 km	MPC · JPL
380362	2002 TD_{106}	—	October 4, 2002	Kitt Peak	Spacewatch	·	1.2 km	MPC · JPL
380363	2002 TJ_{118}	—	October 3, 2002	Palomar	NEAT	·	1.0 km	MPC · JPL
380364	2002 TG_{125}	—	October 4, 2002	Palomar	NEAT	EOS	2.2 km	MPC · JPL
380365	2002 TB_{134}	—	October 4, 2002	Palomar	NEAT	·	3.3 km	MPC · JPL
380366	2002 TR_{161}	—	October 5, 2002	Socorro	LINEAR	T_{j} (2.94)	5.3 km	MPC · JPL
380367	2002 TY_{185}	—	October 4, 2002	Socorro	LINEAR	·	1.0 km	MPC · JPL
380368	2002 TJ_{188}	—	October 4, 2002	Palomar	NEAT	(2076)	970 m	MPC · JPL
380369	2002 TJ_{209}	—	October 6, 2002	Socorro	LINEAR	·	2.3 km	MPC · JPL
380370	2002 TF_{216}	—	October 5, 2002	Palomar	NEAT	·	3.7 km	MPC · JPL
380371	2002 TM_{217}	—	October 7, 2002	Socorro	LINEAR	·	2.5 km	MPC · JPL
380372	2002 TZ_{222}	—	October 7, 2002	Socorro	LINEAR	·	1.5 km	MPC · JPL
380373	2002 TS_{225}	—	October 8, 2002	Anderson Mesa	LONEOS	·	3.3 km	MPC · JPL
380374	2002 TE_{310}	—	October 4, 2002	Apache Point	SDSS	·	1.4 km	MPC · JPL
380375	2002 TQ_{333}	—	October 5, 2002	Apache Point	SDSS	·	2.2 km	MPC · JPL
380376	2002 TW_{346}	—	October 5, 2002	Apache Point	SDSS	·	2.0 km	MPC · JPL
380377	2002 TM_{348}	—	October 5, 2002	Apache Point	SDSS	·	2.5 km	MPC · JPL
380378	2002 UC_{13}	—	October 28, 2002	Haleakala	NEAT	·	1.2 km	MPC · JPL
380379	2002 UN_{62}	—	October 30, 2002	Apache Point	SDSS	·	870 m	MPC · JPL
380380	2002 UP_{73}	—	October 31, 2002	Palomar	NEAT	·	860 m	MPC · JPL
380381	2002 VZ_{9}	—	November 1, 2002	Palomar	NEAT	·	1.1 km	MPC · JPL
380382	2002 VS_{20}	—	October 5, 2002	Socorro	LINEAR	·	2.9 km	MPC · JPL
380383	2002 VA_{24}	—	November 5, 2002	Socorro	LINEAR	·	1.1 km	MPC · JPL
380384	2002 VE_{64}	—	November 6, 2002	Anderson Mesa	LONEOS	V	870 m	MPC · JPL
380385	2002 VU_{68}	—	November 7, 2002	Anderson Mesa	LONEOS	slow	4.2 km	MPC · JPL
380386	2002 VO_{74}	—	November 7, 2002	Socorro	LINEAR	·	3.5 km	MPC · JPL
380387	2002 VK_{123}	—	November 13, 2002	Palomar	NEAT	NYS	1.1 km	MPC · JPL
380388	2002 VX_{138}	—	November 13, 2002	Palomar	NEAT	·	2.7 km	MPC · JPL
380389	2002 WB_{26}	—	November 16, 2002	Palomar	NEAT	·	1.0 km	MPC · JPL
380390	2002 WJ_{30}	—	November 24, 2002	Palomar	NEAT	MAS	630 m	MPC · JPL
380391	2002 XC_{24}	—	December 5, 2002	Socorro	LINEAR	·	1.3 km	MPC · JPL
380392	2002 XS_{49}	—	December 5, 2002	Socorro	LINEAR	·	1.1 km	MPC · JPL
380393	2002 XL_{63}	—	December 11, 2002	Socorro	LINEAR	·	1.1 km	MPC · JPL
380394	2002 XM_{76}	—	December 11, 2002	Socorro	LINEAR	·	1.6 km	MPC · JPL
380395	2002 XK_{78}	—	December 11, 2002	Socorro	LINEAR	·	3.3 km	MPC · JPL
380396	2002 XB_{89}	—	December 14, 2002	Socorro	LINEAR	·	4.9 km	MPC · JPL
380397	2002 XE_{89}	—	December 15, 2002	Ametlla de Mar	J. Nomen	·	1.9 km	MPC · JPL
380398	2002 XL_{93}	—	December 5, 2002	Socorro	LINEAR	·	1.1 km	MPC · JPL
380399	2002 XZ_{115}	—	December 5, 2002	Palomar	NEAT	·	3.5 km	MPC · JPL
380400	2002 XV_{118}	—	December 3, 2002	Palomar	NEAT	TIR	2.9 km	MPC · JPL

== 380401–380500 ==
back to top

Designation			Discovery			Properties		Ref
Permanent	Provisional	Named after	Date	Site	Discoverer(s)	Category	Diam.	Ref
380401	2002 XQ_{119}	—	December 7, 2002	Palomar	NEAT	·	3.1 km	MPC · JPL
380402	2002 XB_{120}	—	December 3, 2002	Haleakala	NEAT	·	1.2 km	MPC · JPL
380403	2002 YD_{7}	—	December 28, 2002	Anderson Mesa	LONEOS	TIR	5.3 km	MPC · JPL
380404	2002 YM_{7}	—	December 31, 2002	Socorro	LINEAR	·	4.0 km	MPC · JPL
380405	2002 YZ_{17}	—	December 31, 2002	Socorro	LINEAR	·	1.3 km	MPC · JPL
380406	2002 YG_{19}	—	December 31, 2002	Socorro	LINEAR	NYS	1.2 km	MPC · JPL
380407	2003 AL_{9}	—	January 3, 2003	Kitt Peak	Spacewatch	·	2.7 km	MPC · JPL
380408	2003 AU_{22}	—	January 7, 2003	Socorro	LINEAR	·	5.8 km	MPC · JPL
380409	2003 AA_{34}	—	January 5, 2003	Socorro	LINEAR	PHO	1.7 km	MPC · JPL
380410	2003 AD_{54}	—	January 5, 2003	Socorro	LINEAR	·	3.0 km	MPC · JPL
380411	2003 AM_{56}	—	January 5, 2003	Socorro	LINEAR	·	1.4 km	MPC · JPL
380412	2003 AW_{71}	—	January 11, 2003	Palomar	NEAT	PHO	2.5 km	MPC · JPL
380413	2003 AS_{76}	—	January 10, 2003	Socorro	LINEAR	·	3.6 km	MPC · JPL
380414	2003 AK_{91}	—	January 5, 2003	Socorro	LINEAR	TIR	3.4 km	MPC · JPL
380415	2003 AL_{92}	—	January 7, 2003	Socorro	LINEAR	THB	6.3 km	MPC · JPL
380416	2003 BT_{4}	—	January 24, 2003	La Silla	A. Boattini, H. Scholl	THB	2.6 km	MPC · JPL
380417	2003 BN_{6}	—	January 24, 2003	Palomar	NEAT	·	1.7 km	MPC · JPL
380418	2003 BN_{7}	—	January 26, 2003	Anderson Mesa	LONEOS	·	3.0 km	MPC · JPL
380419	2003 BZ_{55}	—	January 28, 2003	Palomar	NEAT	PHO	1.4 km	MPC · JPL
380420	2003 BE_{68}	—	January 27, 2003	Haleakala	NEAT	·	4.1 km	MPC · JPL
380421	2003 DE_{14}	—	December 4, 1996	Kitt Peak	Spacewatch	·	4.3 km	MPC · JPL
380422	2003 EQ_{4}	—	March 7, 2003	Palomar	NEAT	·	1.7 km	MPC · JPL
380423	2003 FM_{38}	—	March 23, 2003	Kitt Peak	Spacewatch	·	1.6 km	MPC · JPL
380424	2003 FO_{75}	—	March 27, 2003	Palomar	NEAT	·	1.8 km	MPC · JPL
380425	2003 FQ_{76}	—	March 27, 2003	Palomar	NEAT	·	1.7 km	MPC · JPL
380426	2003 HY_{2}	—	April 24, 2003	Kitt Peak	Spacewatch	·	1.4 km	MPC · JPL
380427	2003 HB_{44}	—	April 27, 2003	Anderson Mesa	LONEOS	·	1.4 km	MPC · JPL
380428	2003 JQ_{5}	—	May 1, 2003	Socorro	LINEAR	·	1.8 km	MPC · JPL
380429	2003 PX_{11}	—	August 1, 2003	Socorro	LINEAR	TIN	1.7 km	MPC · JPL
380430	2003 QX_{44}	—	August 23, 2003	Socorro	LINEAR	·	2.4 km	MPC · JPL
380431	2003 QC_{57}	—	August 23, 2003	Socorro	LINEAR	·	650 m	MPC · JPL
380432	2003 QP_{79}	—	August 26, 2003	Črni Vrh	Mikuž, H.	·	710 m	MPC · JPL
380433	2003 QK_{97}	—	August 30, 2003	Kitt Peak	Spacewatch	·	2.3 km	MPC · JPL
380434	2003 QV_{114}	—	August 20, 2003	Haleakala	NEAT	·	620 m	MPC · JPL
380435	2003 SZ_{86}	—	September 17, 2003	Socorro	LINEAR	·	3.0 km	MPC · JPL
380436	2003 SR_{87}	—	September 17, 2003	Palomar	NEAT	·	820 m	MPC · JPL
380437	2003 SP_{107}	—	September 21, 2003	Socorro	LINEAR	·	680 m	MPC · JPL
380438	2003 SY_{210}	—	September 23, 2003	Palomar	NEAT	·	2.6 km	MPC · JPL
380439	2003 SG_{228}	—	September 28, 2003	Kitt Peak	Spacewatch	·	2.7 km	MPC · JPL
380440	2003 ST_{236}	—	September 26, 2003	Socorro	LINEAR	·	670 m	MPC · JPL
380441	2003 SG_{257}	—	September 1, 2003	Socorro	LINEAR	·	620 m	MPC · JPL
380442	2003 SY_{259}	—	September 28, 2003	Kitt Peak	Spacewatch	·	1.1 km	MPC · JPL
380443	2003 SK_{265}	—	September 29, 2003	Kitt Peak	Spacewatch	·	1.6 km	MPC · JPL
380444	2003 SF_{281}	—	September 18, 2003	Palomar	NEAT	GEF	1.8 km	MPC · JPL
380445	2003 SH_{283}	—	September 20, 2003	Socorro	LINEAR	·	3.0 km	MPC · JPL
380446	2003 SN_{287}	—	September 30, 2003	Kitt Peak	Spacewatch	·	2.1 km	MPC · JPL
380447	2003 SO_{312}	—	September 17, 2003	Anderson Mesa	LONEOS	·	2.7 km	MPC · JPL
380448	2003 SA_{330}	—	September 26, 2003	Apache Point	SDSS	AGN	1.1 km	MPC · JPL
380449	2003 SF_{332}	—	September 28, 2003	Socorro	LINEAR	·	2.1 km	MPC · JPL
380450	2003 SM_{333}	—	September 26, 2003	Apache Point	SDSS	·	1.7 km	MPC · JPL
380451	2003 SQ_{350}	—	September 19, 2003	Kitt Peak	Spacewatch	·	2.4 km	MPC · JPL
380452	2003 SP_{370}	—	September 26, 2003	Apache Point	SDSS	·	1.8 km	MPC · JPL
380453	2003 TX_{18}	—	October 15, 2003	Anderson Mesa	LONEOS	·	800 m	MPC · JPL
380454	2003 TC_{35}	—	October 1, 2003	Kitt Peak	Spacewatch	·	1.6 km	MPC · JPL
380455	2003 UL_{3}	—	October 16, 2003	Palomar	NEAT	APO +1km	1.1 km	MPC · JPL
380456	2003 UZ_{21}	—	October 22, 2003	Kingsnake	J. V. McClusky	·	2.3 km	MPC · JPL
380457	2003 UO_{49}	—	October 16, 2003	Palomar	NEAT	·	990 m	MPC · JPL
380458	2003 UQ_{56}	—	October 22, 2003	Kitt Peak	Spacewatch	·	2.1 km	MPC · JPL
380459	2003 UU_{155}	—	October 20, 2003	Kitt Peak	Spacewatch	·	1.8 km	MPC · JPL
380460	2003 UQ_{171}	—	October 20, 2003	Kitt Peak	Spacewatch	·	870 m	MPC · JPL
380461	2003 UD_{176}	—	October 21, 2003	Anderson Mesa	LONEOS	·	620 m	MPC · JPL
380462	2003 UJ_{252}	—	October 26, 2003	Kitt Peak	Spacewatch	·	2.8 km	MPC · JPL
380463	2003 UZ_{271}	—	October 28, 2003	Socorro	LINEAR	·	1.7 km	MPC · JPL
380464	2003 UB_{295}	—	October 16, 2003	Kitt Peak	Spacewatch	·	2.0 km	MPC · JPL
380465	2003 UM_{314}	—	October 20, 2003	Kitt Peak	Spacewatch	·	660 m	MPC · JPL
380466	2003 UV_{315}	—	October 20, 2003	Socorro	LINEAR	·	2.1 km	MPC · JPL
380467	2003 UG_{322}	—	October 16, 2003	Kitt Peak	Spacewatch	·	1.7 km	MPC · JPL
380468	2003 UG_{326}	—	October 17, 2003	Apache Point	SDSS	·	2.8 km	MPC · JPL
380469	2003 UK_{343}	—	October 19, 2003	Apache Point	SDSS	·	2.2 km	MPC · JPL
380470	2003 UT_{367}	—	September 28, 2003	Kitt Peak	Spacewatch	KOR	1.3 km	MPC · JPL
380471	2003 UG_{408}	—	October 23, 2003	Apache Point	SDSS	·	610 m	MPC · JPL
380472	2003 WR_{24}	—	November 20, 2003	Socorro	LINEAR	·	1.3 km	MPC · JPL
380473	2003 WB_{90}	—	November 16, 2003	Kitt Peak	Spacewatch	·	1.8 km	MPC · JPL
380474	2003 WX_{92}	—	November 19, 2003	Anderson Mesa	LONEOS	·	850 m	MPC · JPL
380475	2003 WC_{101}	—	November 21, 2003	Socorro	LINEAR	·	2.8 km	MPC · JPL
380476	2003 YO_{1}	—	December 18, 2003	Kitt Peak	Spacewatch	APO	470 m	MPC · JPL
380477	2003 YR_{64}	—	December 19, 2003	Socorro	LINEAR	·	690 m	MPC · JPL
380478	2003 YU_{86}	—	December 19, 2003	Socorro	LINEAR	·	2.4 km	MPC · JPL
380479	2003 YP_{131}	—	December 28, 2003	Socorro	LINEAR	·	960 m	MPC · JPL
380480 Glennhawley	2003 YW_{176}	Glennhawley	December 16, 2003	Mauna Kea	D. D. Balam	EOS	1.7 km	MPC · JPL
380481	2003 YF_{181}	—	December 22, 2003	Kitt Peak	Spacewatch	·	2.9 km	MPC · JPL
380482	2004 AG_{4}	—	January 15, 2004	Kitt Peak	Spacewatch	·	1.7 km	MPC · JPL
380483	2004 AV_{6}	—	January 15, 2004	Kitt Peak	Spacewatch	·	710 m	MPC · JPL
380484	2004 AS_{23}	—	December 22, 2003	Kitt Peak	Spacewatch	·	2.9 km	MPC · JPL
380485	2004 BS_{29}	—	January 18, 2004	Palomar	NEAT	EOS	2.6 km	MPC · JPL
380486	2004 BB_{50}	—	January 21, 2004	Socorro	LINEAR	EOS	2.3 km	MPC · JPL
380487	2004 BC_{75}	—	January 21, 2004	Socorro	LINEAR	H	590 m	MPC · JPL
380488	2004 BX_{98}	—	January 27, 2004	Kitt Peak	Spacewatch	·	4.2 km	MPC · JPL
380489	2004 BS_{99}	—	January 27, 2004	Kitt Peak	Spacewatch	·	2.5 km	MPC · JPL
380490	2004 BV_{140}	—	January 19, 2004	Kitt Peak	Spacewatch	·	540 m	MPC · JPL
380491	2004 CM_{14}	—	February 11, 2004	Kitt Peak	Spacewatch	·	3.3 km	MPC · JPL
380492	2004 CK_{21}	—	February 11, 2004	Anderson Mesa	LONEOS	(31811)	3.6 km	MPC · JPL
380493	2004 CY_{22}	—	February 12, 2004	Kitt Peak	Spacewatch	·	590 m	MPC · JPL
380494	2004 CX_{49}	—	February 11, 2004	Palomar	NEAT	H	650 m	MPC · JPL
380495	2004 CL_{89}	—	February 11, 2004	Kitt Peak	Spacewatch	·	720 m	MPC · JPL
380496	2004 CV_{110}	—	February 13, 2004	Kitt Peak	Spacewatch	·	2.7 km	MPC · JPL
380497	2004 CB_{119}	—	February 11, 2004	Kitt Peak	Spacewatch	·	1.9 km	MPC · JPL
380498	2004 DT	—	February 16, 2004	Kitt Peak	Spacewatch	·	2.1 km	MPC · JPL
380499	2004 DC_{34}	—	February 18, 2004	Catalina	CSS	·	1.1 km	MPC · JPL
380500	2004 DQ_{44}	—	February 17, 2004	Kitt Peak	Spacewatch	·	1.3 km	MPC · JPL

== 380501–380600 ==
back to top

Designation			Discovery			Properties		Ref
Permanent	Provisional	Named after	Date	Site	Discoverer(s)	Category	Diam.	Ref
380501	2004 DZ_{57}	—	February 23, 2004	Socorro	LINEAR	·	560 m	MPC · JPL
380502	2004 DZ_{69}	—	January 4, 2004	Siding Spring	R. H. McNaught	·	3.0 km	MPC · JPL
380503	2004 EY_{2}	—	March 9, 2004	Palomar	NEAT	·	3.4 km	MPC · JPL
380504	2004 EP_{21}	—	February 26, 2004	Socorro	LINEAR	·	840 m	MPC · JPL
380505	2004 EW_{44}	—	March 15, 2004	Kitt Peak	Spacewatch	·	2.3 km	MPC · JPL
380506	2004 EM_{65}	—	March 14, 2004	Socorro	LINEAR	·	3.7 km	MPC · JPL
380507	2004 EL_{82}	—	March 15, 2004	Socorro	LINEAR	·	2.2 km	MPC · JPL
380508	2004 EU_{111}	—	March 15, 2004	Socorro	LINEAR	·	910 m	MPC · JPL
380509	2004 FY_{5}	—	January 30, 2004	Socorro	LINEAR	·	820 m	MPC · JPL
380510	2004 FF_{8}	—	January 18, 2004	Kitt Peak	Spacewatch	·	920 m	MPC · JPL
380511	2004 FO_{9}	—	March 16, 2004	Kitt Peak	Spacewatch	·	650 m	MPC · JPL
380512	2004 FX_{44}	—	March 16, 2004	Socorro	LINEAR	PHO	1.3 km	MPC · JPL
380513	2004 FL_{47}	—	March 18, 2004	Kitt Peak	Spacewatch	·	1.4 km	MPC · JPL
380514	2004 FF_{71}	—	March 17, 2004	Kitt Peak	Spacewatch	·	650 m	MPC · JPL
380515	2004 FQ_{93}	—	March 22, 2004	Socorro	LINEAR	NYS	1.4 km	MPC · JPL
380516	2004 FX_{95}	—	March 23, 2004	Socorro	LINEAR	·	1.3 km	MPC · JPL
380517	2004 FR_{103}	—	March 23, 2004	Socorro	LINEAR	·	4.8 km	MPC · JPL
380518	2004 FC_{122}	—	March 19, 2004	Socorro	LINEAR	·	1.3 km	MPC · JPL
380519	2004 FW_{124}	—	March 27, 2004	Socorro	LINEAR	NYS	900 m	MPC · JPL
380520	2004 FV_{125}	—	March 27, 2004	Socorro	LINEAR	·	2.5 km	MPC · JPL
380521	2004 FX_{160}	—	March 18, 2004	Palomar	NEAT	·	3.9 km	MPC · JPL
380522	2004 GK	—	April 10, 2004	Wrightwood	J. W. Young	·	1.3 km	MPC · JPL
380523	2004 GQ	—	March 27, 2004	Socorro	LINEAR	·	1.1 km	MPC · JPL
380524	2004 GY	—	April 11, 2004	Catalina	CSS	AMO	330 m	MPC · JPL
380525	2004 GE_{4}	—	April 11, 2004	Palomar	NEAT	·	930 m	MPC · JPL
380526	2004 GN_{4}	—	March 23, 2004	Kitt Peak	Spacewatch	NYS	880 m	MPC · JPL
380527	2004 GQ_{11}	—	April 12, 2004	Socorro	LINEAR	·	3.8 km	MPC · JPL
380528	2004 GU_{12}	—	April 11, 2004	Palomar	NEAT	·	1.7 km	MPC · JPL
380529	2004 GJ_{53}	—	April 13, 2004	Kitt Peak	Spacewatch	·	3.1 km	MPC · JPL
380530	2004 GL_{58}	—	April 14, 2004	Kitt Peak	Spacewatch	·	1.0 km	MPC · JPL
380531	2004 GE_{59}	—	April 12, 2004	Palomar	NEAT	·	1.6 km	MPC · JPL
380532	2004 GT_{75}	—	April 15, 2004	Siding Spring	SSS	·	4.0 km	MPC · JPL
380533	2004 GH_{77}	—	April 13, 2004	Siding Spring	SSS	·	4.8 km	MPC · JPL
380534	2004 HQ_{35}	—	April 20, 2004	Socorro	LINEAR	·	1.3 km	MPC · JPL
380535	2004 HL_{44}	—	March 31, 2004	Kitt Peak	Spacewatch	·	1.5 km	MPC · JPL
380536	2004 HB_{49}	—	April 22, 2004	Campo Imperatore	CINEOS	MAS	750 m	MPC · JPL
380537	2004 HS_{55}	—	April 24, 2004	Socorro	LINEAR	EUP	4.1 km	MPC · JPL
380538	2004 JY_{5}	—	May 12, 2004	Socorro	LINEAR	H	690 m	MPC · JPL
380539	2004 JG_{56}	—	May 12, 2004	Apache Point	SDSS	H · slow	700 m	MPC · JPL
380540	2004 KQ_{10}	—	May 19, 2004	Campo Imperatore	CINEOS	H	690 m	MPC · JPL
380541	2004 KB_{13}	—	May 23, 2004	Socorro	LINEAR	H	640 m	MPC · JPL
380542	2004 LA_{7}	—	June 11, 2004	Socorro	LINEAR	·	1.4 km	MPC · JPL
380543	2004 NH_{10}	—	July 9, 2004	Socorro	LINEAR	RAF	1.4 km	MPC · JPL
380544	2004 NV_{18}	—	July 14, 2004	Socorro	LINEAR	·	1.1 km	MPC · JPL
380545	2004 NL_{22}	—	July 11, 2004	Socorro	LINEAR	·	1.6 km	MPC · JPL
380546	2004 NB_{25}	—	June 18, 2004	Socorro	LINEAR	·	1.5 km	MPC · JPL
380547	2004 NR_{30}	—	July 9, 2004	Anderson Mesa	LONEOS	·	1.7 km	MPC · JPL
380548	2004 NR_{33}	—	July 14, 2004	Siding Spring	SSS	·	1.5 km	MPC · JPL
380549	2004 OJ_{4}	—	July 17, 2004	Reedy Creek	J. Broughton	·	1.4 km	MPC · JPL
380550	2004 OT_{5}	—	July 16, 2004	Reedy Creek	J. Broughton	·	3.6 km	MPC · JPL
380551	2004 OO_{9}	—	July 20, 2004	Reedy Creek	J. Broughton	·	1.5 km	MPC · JPL
380552	2004 PA	—	August 4, 2004	Palomar	NEAT	·	1.5 km	MPC · JPL
380553	2004 PX_{10}	—	August 7, 2004	Palomar	NEAT	(5)	1.3 km	MPC · JPL
380554	2004 PC_{16}	—	August 7, 2004	Palomar	NEAT	·	1.5 km	MPC · JPL
380555	2004 PZ_{16}	—	August 7, 2004	Campo Imperatore	CINEOS	·	1.5 km	MPC · JPL
380556	2004 PN_{48}	—	August 8, 2004	Socorro	LINEAR	·	1.4 km	MPC · JPL
380557	2004 PT_{51}	—	August 8, 2004	Socorro	LINEAR	·	1.2 km	MPC · JPL
380558	2004 PC_{81}	—	August 10, 2004	Socorro	LINEAR	·	1.4 km	MPC · JPL
380559	2004 PR_{106}	—	August 15, 2004	Campo Imperatore	CINEOS	·	1.6 km	MPC · JPL
380560	2004 PQ_{109}	—	August 12, 2004	Cerro Tololo	M. W. Buie	·	1.6 km	MPC · JPL
380561	2004 QQ_{5}	—	August 21, 2004	Wise	Wise	·	1.2 km	MPC · JPL
380562	2004 QF_{9}	—	August 20, 2004	Siding Spring	SSS	·	1.9 km	MPC · JPL
380563	2004 QB_{18}	—	August 19, 2004	Socorro	LINEAR	·	2.4 km	MPC · JPL
380564	2004 QK_{18}	—	August 13, 2004	Socorro	LINEAR	·	2.2 km	MPC · JPL
380565	2004 QO_{19}	—	August 23, 2004	Siding Spring	SSS	·	1.6 km	MPC · JPL
380566	2004 QW_{24}	—	August 24, 2004	Siding Spring	SSS	·	2.4 km	MPC · JPL
380567	2004 RD_{13}	—	August 11, 2004	Socorro	LINEAR	JUN	1.1 km	MPC · JPL
380568	2004 RW_{22}	—	September 7, 2004	Kitt Peak	Spacewatch	·	1.4 km	MPC · JPL
380569	2004 RR_{25}	—	September 8, 2004	Campo Imperatore	CINEOS	EUN	1.9 km	MPC · JPL
380570	2004 RD_{40}	—	September 7, 2004	Socorro	LINEAR	·	2.0 km	MPC · JPL
380571	2004 RF_{56}	—	September 8, 2004	Socorro	LINEAR	·	1.1 km	MPC · JPL
380572	2004 RW_{93}	—	September 8, 2004	Socorro	LINEAR	JUN	770 m	MPC · JPL
380573	2004 RL_{110}	—	September 11, 2004	Socorro	LINEAR	BAR	1.5 km	MPC · JPL
380574	2004 RL_{114}	—	September 7, 2004	Kitt Peak	Spacewatch	·	1.3 km	MPC · JPL
380575	2004 RT_{162}	—	September 11, 2004	Socorro	LINEAR	JUN	1.8 km	MPC · JPL
380576	2004 RE_{163}	—	September 11, 2004	Kitt Peak	Spacewatch	·	1.7 km	MPC · JPL
380577	2004 RJ_{169}	—	September 8, 2004	Socorro	LINEAR	·	1.6 km	MPC · JPL
380578	2004 RR_{180}	—	September 10, 2004	Socorro	LINEAR	·	1.3 km	MPC · JPL
380579	2004 RP_{183}	—	September 10, 2004	Socorro	LINEAR	·	2.4 km	MPC · JPL
380580	2004 RZ_{187}	—	September 10, 2004	Socorro	LINEAR	·	2.0 km	MPC · JPL
380581	2004 RS_{195}	—	September 10, 2004	Socorro	LINEAR	·	2.0 km	MPC · JPL
380582	2004 RD_{206}	—	September 10, 2004	Socorro	LINEAR	·	1.9 km	MPC · JPL
380583	2004 RK_{209}	—	September 11, 2004	Socorro	LINEAR	·	1.6 km	MPC · JPL
380584	2004 RG_{216}	—	September 11, 2004	Socorro	LINEAR	·	2.1 km	MPC · JPL
380585	2004 RW_{217}	—	September 11, 2004	Socorro	LINEAR	·	2.1 km	MPC · JPL
380586	2004 RJ_{234}	—	September 9, 2004	Kitt Peak	Spacewatch	·	1.6 km	MPC · JPL
380587	2004 RP_{243}	—	September 10, 2004	Kitt Peak	Spacewatch	·	1.2 km	MPC · JPL
380588	2004 RY_{250}	—	September 14, 2004	Socorro	LINEAR	MAR	1.4 km	MPC · JPL
380589	2004 RX_{252}	—	September 15, 2004	Socorro	LINEAR	HNS	1.4 km	MPC · JPL
380590	2004 RP_{288}	—	September 14, 2004	Andrushivka	Kovalchuk, G., Lokot, V.	EUN	1.5 km	MPC · JPL
380591	2004 RP_{312}	—	September 15, 2004	Anderson Mesa	LONEOS	·	2.1 km	MPC · JPL
380592	2004 RE_{323}	—	September 13, 2004	Socorro	LINEAR	EUN	1.6 km	MPC · JPL
380593	2004 RY_{323}	—	September 13, 2004	Socorro	LINEAR	·	1.9 km	MPC · JPL
380594	2004 RA_{341}	—	September 7, 2004	Socorro	LINEAR	EUN	1.5 km	MPC · JPL
380595	2004 RU_{341}	—	September 10, 2004	Kitt Peak	Spacewatch	·	1.1 km	MPC · JPL
380596	2004 SX_{3}	—	September 17, 2004	Socorro	LINEAR	·	1.4 km	MPC · JPL
380597	2004 SB_{4}	—	September 17, 2004	Anderson Mesa	LONEOS	MAR	1.7 km	MPC · JPL
380598	2004 SE_{22}	—	September 17, 2004	Socorro	LINEAR	EUN	1.3 km	MPC · JPL
380599	2004 SW_{28}	—	September 17, 2004	Socorro	LINEAR	·	1.8 km	MPC · JPL
380600	2004 SV_{40}	—	September 17, 2004	Socorro	LINEAR	·	2.2 km	MPC · JPL

== 380601–380700 ==
back to top

Designation			Discovery			Properties		Ref
Permanent	Provisional	Named after	Date	Site	Discoverer(s)	Category	Diam.	Ref
380601	2004 SD_{54}	—	September 22, 2004	Socorro	LINEAR	·	2.2 km	MPC · JPL
380602	2004 TE_{14}	—	September 8, 2004	Socorro	LINEAR	·	2.2 km	MPC · JPL
380603	2004 TO_{47}	—	October 4, 2004	Kitt Peak	Spacewatch	·	1.6 km	MPC · JPL
380604	2004 TN_{56}	—	October 5, 2004	Kitt Peak	Spacewatch	·	1.6 km	MPC · JPL
380605	2004 TO_{62}	—	October 5, 2004	Kitt Peak	Spacewatch	ADE	2.1 km	MPC · JPL
380606	2004 TC_{68}	—	October 5, 2004	Anderson Mesa	LONEOS	·	2.0 km	MPC · JPL
380607 Sharma	2004 TV_{69}	Sharma	October 5, 2004	Vail-Jarnac	Jarnac	·	1.9 km	MPC · JPL
380608	2004 TA_{70}	—	October 5, 2004	Palomar	NEAT	·	2.1 km	MPC · JPL
380609	2004 TP_{75}	—	October 6, 2004	Palomar	NEAT	·	1.5 km	MPC · JPL
380610	2004 TE_{96}	—	October 5, 2004	Kitt Peak	Spacewatch	·	2.8 km	MPC · JPL
380611	2004 TD_{102}	—	October 6, 2004	Kitt Peak	Spacewatch	·	1.5 km	MPC · JPL
380612	2004 TK_{123}	—	October 7, 2004	Anderson Mesa	LONEOS	EUN	1.6 km	MPC · JPL
380613	2004 TE_{126}	—	October 7, 2004	Socorro	LINEAR	·	1.6 km	MPC · JPL
380614	2004 TJ_{139}	—	October 9, 2004	Anderson Mesa	LONEOS	·	1.6 km	MPC · JPL
380615	2004 TQ_{161}	—	October 6, 2004	Kitt Peak	Spacewatch	·	1.5 km	MPC · JPL
380616	2004 TW_{204}	—	October 7, 2004	Kitt Peak	Spacewatch	·	1.6 km	MPC · JPL
380617	2004 TT_{220}	—	October 6, 2004	Palomar	NEAT	·	2.9 km	MPC · JPL
380618	2004 TS_{228}	—	October 8, 2004	Kitt Peak	Spacewatch	·	1.8 km	MPC · JPL
380619	2004 TX_{249}	—	October 7, 2004	Socorro	LINEAR	JUN	1.3 km	MPC · JPL
380620	2004 TS_{274}	—	October 9, 2004	Kitt Peak	Spacewatch	·	1.6 km	MPC · JPL
380621	2004 TU_{278}	—	October 9, 2004	Kitt Peak	Spacewatch	·	1.8 km	MPC · JPL
380622	2004 TW_{287}	—	October 9, 2004	Socorro	LINEAR	HNS	1.7 km	MPC · JPL
380623	2004 TM_{294}	—	October 10, 2004	Palomar	NEAT	·	2.2 km	MPC · JPL
380624	2004 TU_{298}	—	September 17, 2004	Kitt Peak	Spacewatch	MIS	2.4 km	MPC · JPL
380625	2004 TQ_{302}	—	October 9, 2004	Socorro	LINEAR	ADE	3.7 km	MPC · JPL
380626	2004 TZ_{336}	—	October 11, 2004	Palomar	NEAT	·	2.1 km	MPC · JPL
380627	2004 TM_{349}	—	October 8, 2004	Kitt Peak	Spacewatch	·	1.6 km	MPC · JPL
380628	2004 TO_{349}	—	October 8, 2004	Kitt Peak	Spacewatch	·	1.8 km	MPC · JPL
380629	2004 TO_{356}	—	October 14, 2004	Anderson Mesa	LONEOS	·	2.7 km	MPC · JPL
380630	2004 UM_{1}	—	October 22, 2004	Pla D'Arguines	D'Arguines, Pla	·	2.4 km	MPC · JPL
380631	2004 VT_{19}	—	October 7, 2004	Kitt Peak	Spacewatch	·	2.2 km	MPC · JPL
380632	2004 VH_{22}	—	November 4, 2004	Kitt Peak	Spacewatch	·	2.3 km	MPC · JPL
380633	2004 VP_{81}	—	November 4, 2004	Kitt Peak	Spacewatch	·	2.4 km	MPC · JPL
380634	2004 VD_{112}	—	November 3, 2004	Anderson Mesa	LONEOS	·	2.7 km	MPC · JPL
380635	2004 XR_{9}	—	December 2, 2004	Catalina	CSS	EUN	1.9 km	MPC · JPL
380636	2004 XN_{14}	—	December 10, 2004	Catalina	CSS	ATE · PHA	400 m	MPC · JPL
380637	2004 XK_{22}	—	December 8, 2004	Socorro	LINEAR	EUN	1.9 km	MPC · JPL
380638	2004 XK_{23}	—	December 8, 2004	Socorro	LINEAR	(1547)	2.6 km	MPC · JPL
380639	2004 XN_{42}	—	December 2, 2004	Palomar	NEAT	·	2.1 km	MPC · JPL
380640	2004 XU_{56}	—	December 10, 2004	Kitt Peak	Spacewatch	·	1.6 km	MPC · JPL
380641	2004 XN_{107}	—	December 11, 2004	Socorro	LINEAR	JUN	1.7 km	MPC · JPL
380642	2004 XD_{121}	—	December 14, 2004	Socorro	LINEAR	·	2.0 km	MPC · JPL
380643	2004 XS_{124}	—	December 11, 2004	Catalina	CSS	ADE	2.5 km	MPC · JPL
380644	2004 XG_{125}	—	December 11, 2004	Catalina	CSS	·	2.9 km	MPC · JPL
380645	2004 XA_{138}	—	December 13, 2004	Kitt Peak	Spacewatch	·	2.3 km	MPC · JPL
380646	2004 XL_{140}	—	December 13, 2004	Kitt Peak	Spacewatch	·	1.7 km	MPC · JPL
380647	2004 XC_{163}	—	December 15, 2004	Socorro	LINEAR	·	2.8 km	MPC · JPL
380648	2004 XH_{192}	—	December 12, 2004	Kitt Peak	Spacewatch	·	2.0 km	MPC · JPL
380649	2004 YU_{4}	—	December 17, 2004	Haleakala	NEAT	·	2.5 km	MPC · JPL
380650	2004 YM_{27}	—	December 16, 2004	Socorro	LINEAR	·	2.5 km	MPC · JPL
380651	2004 YS_{27}	—	December 16, 2004	Socorro	LINEAR	·	2.5 km	MPC · JPL
380652	2005 AL_{6}	—	January 6, 2005	Socorro	LINEAR	·	2.2 km	MPC · JPL
380653	2005 AR_{38}	—	January 13, 2005	Catalina	CSS	EUN	1.8 km	MPC · JPL
380654	2005 BV_{28}	—	January 31, 2005	Palomar	NEAT	·	1.7 km	MPC · JPL
380655	2005 CZ_{2}	—	February 1, 2005	Catalina	CSS	·	2.3 km	MPC · JPL
380656	2005 CQ_{52}	—	February 3, 2005	Socorro	LINEAR	·	2.8 km	MPC · JPL
380657	2005 DN_{1}	—	February 17, 2005	La Silla	A. Boattini, H. Scholl	THM	2.7 km	MPC · JPL
380658	2005 EM_{12}	—	March 2, 2005	Catalina	CSS	·	730 m	MPC · JPL
380659	2005 EL_{19}	—	March 3, 2005	Kitt Peak	Spacewatch	·	2.7 km	MPC · JPL
380660	2005 EV_{54}	—	March 4, 2005	Kitt Peak	Spacewatch	·	1.9 km	MPC · JPL
380661	2005 EF_{137}	—	March 9, 2005	Mount Lemmon	Mount Lemmon Survey	·	710 m	MPC · JPL
380662	2005 EM_{152}	—	March 10, 2005	Kitt Peak	Spacewatch	·	3.1 km	MPC · JPL
380663	2005 EF_{187}	—	March 10, 2005	Mount Lemmon	Mount Lemmon Survey	EOS	2.2 km	MPC · JPL
380664	2005 EE_{217}	—	March 9, 2005	Catalina	CSS	·	2.5 km	MPC · JPL
380665	2005 EF_{224}	—	March 10, 2005	Anderson Mesa	LONEOS	·	1.7 km	MPC · JPL
380666	2005 EV_{248}	—	March 12, 2005	Socorro	LINEAR	·	2.7 km	MPC · JPL
380667	2005 EV_{257}	—	March 11, 2005	Mount Lemmon	Mount Lemmon Survey	·	2.8 km	MPC · JPL
380668	2005 EA_{279}	—	March 9, 2005	Mount Lemmon	Mount Lemmon Survey	·	2.1 km	MPC · JPL
380669	2005 EV_{281}	—	March 10, 2005	Catalina	CSS	EMA	5.4 km	MPC · JPL
380670	2005 EO_{282}	—	March 10, 2005	Mount Lemmon	Mount Lemmon Survey	EOS	2.6 km	MPC · JPL
380671	2005 GZ_{19}	—	April 2, 2005	Mount Lemmon	Mount Lemmon Survey	·	2.8 km	MPC · JPL
380672	2005 GL_{23}	—	April 1, 2005	Kitt Peak	Spacewatch	·	630 m	MPC · JPL
380673	2005 GN_{25}	—	April 2, 2005	Mount Lemmon	Mount Lemmon Survey	THM	2.1 km	MPC · JPL
380674	2005 GF_{39}	—	April 4, 2005	Mount Lemmon	Mount Lemmon Survey	·	2.1 km	MPC · JPL
380675	2005 GH_{45}	—	April 5, 2005	Palomar	NEAT	·	880 m	MPC · JPL
380676	2005 GN_{51}	—	April 2, 2005	Mount Lemmon	Mount Lemmon Survey	·	2.6 km	MPC · JPL
380677	2005 GX_{52}	—	April 2, 2005	Mount Lemmon	Mount Lemmon Survey	VER	3.0 km	MPC · JPL
380678	2005 GO_{76}	—	April 5, 2005	Mount Lemmon	Mount Lemmon Survey	·	4.6 km	MPC · JPL
380679	2005 GS_{79}	—	April 6, 2005	Mount Lemmon	Mount Lemmon Survey	·	4.6 km	MPC · JPL
380680	2005 GK_{80}	—	April 7, 2005	Kitt Peak	Spacewatch	·	3.6 km	MPC · JPL
380681	2005 GN_{95}	—	April 6, 2005	Kitt Peak	Spacewatch	·	660 m	MPC · JPL
380682	2005 GK_{98}	—	April 7, 2005	Palomar	NEAT	·	3.5 km	MPC · JPL
380683	2005 GY_{103}	—	April 9, 2005	Socorro	LINEAR	·	2.7 km	MPC · JPL
380684	2005 GZ_{106}	—	April 10, 2005	Kitt Peak	Spacewatch	·	810 m	MPC · JPL
380685	2005 GE_{109}	—	April 10, 2005	Mount Lemmon	Mount Lemmon Survey	·	790 m	MPC · JPL
380686	2005 GR_{111}	—	April 5, 2005	Mount Lemmon	Mount Lemmon Survey	·	760 m	MPC · JPL
380687	2005 JG_{5}	—	May 4, 2005	Kitt Peak	Spacewatch	·	3.9 km	MPC · JPL
380688	2005 JA_{13}	—	May 4, 2005	Mauna Kea	Veillet, C.	EOS	1.9 km	MPC · JPL
380689	2005 JB_{17}	—	May 4, 2005	Palomar	NEAT	·	1.0 km	MPC · JPL
380690	2005 JW_{24}	—	May 3, 2005	Kitt Peak	Spacewatch	·	2.6 km	MPC · JPL
380691	2005 JW_{27}	—	May 3, 2005	Catalina	CSS	TIR	3.9 km	MPC · JPL
380692	2005 JJ_{32}	—	May 4, 2005	Mount Lemmon	Mount Lemmon Survey	·	700 m	MPC · JPL
380693	2005 JY_{35}	—	May 4, 2005	Kitt Peak	Spacewatch	EOS	3.4 km	MPC · JPL
380694	2005 JU_{59}	—	May 8, 2005	Kitt Peak	Spacewatch	·	900 m	MPC · JPL
380695	2005 JP_{60}	—	May 8, 2005	Socorro	LINEAR	T_{j} (2.96)	4.6 km	MPC · JPL
380696	2005 JB_{82}	—	May 9, 2005	Kitt Peak	Spacewatch	·	3.6 km	MPC · JPL
380697	2005 JV_{83}	—	May 8, 2005	Kitt Peak	Spacewatch	·	3.0 km	MPC · JPL
380698	2005 JK_{85}	—	May 8, 2005	Socorro	LINEAR	T_{j} (2.96)	4.4 km	MPC · JPL
380699	2005 JE_{88}	—	May 10, 2005	Kitt Peak	Spacewatch	·	1.6 km	MPC · JPL
380700	2005 JM_{111}	—	May 9, 2005	Socorro	LINEAR	·	4.4 km	MPC · JPL

== 380701–380800 ==
back to top

Designation			Discovery			Properties		Ref
Permanent	Provisional	Named after	Date	Site	Discoverer(s)	Category	Diam.	Ref
380701	2005 JK_{117}	—	May 10, 2005	Kitt Peak	Spacewatch	·	3.7 km	MPC · JPL
380702	2005 JE_{133}	—	May 14, 2005	Kitt Peak	Spacewatch	·	2.3 km	MPC · JPL
380703	2005 JS_{141}	—	May 14, 2005	Mount Lemmon	Mount Lemmon Survey	·	4.3 km	MPC · JPL
380704	2005 JR_{157}	—	May 4, 2005	Palomar	NEAT	(895)	4.7 km	MPC · JPL
380705	2005 KT_{3}	—	May 17, 2005	Mount Lemmon	Mount Lemmon Survey	·	4.9 km	MPC · JPL
380706	2005 KH_{6}	—	May 17, 2005	Socorro	LINEAR	·	1.3 km	MPC · JPL
380707	2005 LE_{39}	—	June 11, 2005	Kitt Peak	Spacewatch	·	5.8 km	MPC · JPL
380708	2005 LG_{53}	—	June 13, 2005	Mount Lemmon	Mount Lemmon Survey	·	1.0 km	MPC · JPL
380709	2005 MK_{19}	—	June 29, 2005	Palomar	NEAT	·	3.2 km	MPC · JPL
380710	2005 MN_{32}	—	June 28, 2005	Palomar	NEAT	·	2.3 km	MPC · JPL
380711	2005 NN_{43}	—	June 14, 2005	Mount Lemmon	Mount Lemmon Survey	·	740 m	MPC · JPL
380712	2005 NG_{49}	—	July 4, 2005	Mount Lemmon	Mount Lemmon Survey	·	1.3 km	MPC · JPL
380713	2005 NY_{67}	—	July 3, 2005	Mount Lemmon	Mount Lemmon Survey	·	740 m	MPC · JPL
380714	2005 NF_{93}	—	July 5, 2005	Palomar	NEAT	·	1.5 km	MPC · JPL
380715	2005 OC_{15}	—	July 28, 2005	Reedy Creek	J. Broughton	V	860 m	MPC · JPL
380716	2005 OS_{20}	—	July 28, 2005	Palomar	NEAT	·	1.1 km	MPC · JPL
380717	2005 QD_{11}	—	August 27, 2005	Junk Bond	D. Healy	NYS	1.0 km	MPC · JPL
380718	2005 QD_{20}	—	August 26, 2005	Anderson Mesa	LONEOS	·	1.8 km	MPC · JPL
380719	2005 QY_{44}	—	August 26, 2005	Palomar	NEAT	V	780 m	MPC · JPL
380720	2005 QL_{58}	—	August 25, 2005	Palomar	NEAT	·	710 m	MPC · JPL
380721	2005 QL_{131}	—	August 28, 2005	Kitt Peak	Spacewatch	·	1.5 km	MPC · JPL
380722	2005 QY_{133}	—	August 28, 2005	Kitt Peak	Spacewatch	·	1.1 km	MPC · JPL
380723	2005 QO_{139}	—	August 28, 2005	Kitt Peak	Spacewatch	·	1.3 km	MPC · JPL
380724	2005 QD_{141}	—	August 29, 2005	Anderson Mesa	LONEOS	·	1.6 km	MPC · JPL
380725	2005 QN_{158}	—	August 26, 2005	Palomar	NEAT	NYS	1.2 km	MPC · JPL
380726	2005 QZ_{177}	—	August 31, 2005	Kitt Peak	Spacewatch	·	1.7 km	MPC · JPL
380727	2005 QE_{183}	—	August 31, 2005	Anderson Mesa	LONEOS	·	1.4 km	MPC · JPL
380728	2005 RM_{13}	—	September 1, 2005	Palomar	NEAT	·	1.0 km	MPC · JPL
380729	2005 RX_{30}	—	September 11, 2005	Anderson Mesa	LONEOS	·	1.8 km	MPC · JPL
380730	2005 RH_{32}	—	September 13, 2005	Kitt Peak	Spacewatch	H	580 m	MPC · JPL
380731	2005 RU_{47}	—	September 13, 2005	Apache Point	A. C. Becker	·	1.4 km	MPC · JPL
380732	2005 SB_{7}	—	September 24, 2005	Kitt Peak	Spacewatch	·	1.2 km	MPC · JPL
380733	2005 SY_{7}	—	September 25, 2005	Catalina	CSS	·	1.7 km	MPC · JPL
380734	2005 SW_{22}	—	September 23, 2005	Kitt Peak	Spacewatch	·	1.3 km	MPC · JPL
380735	2005 SP_{26}	—	September 23, 2005	Kitt Peak	Spacewatch	NYS	1.3 km	MPC · JPL
380736	2005 SJ_{27}	—	September 23, 2005	Kitt Peak	Spacewatch	·	1.1 km	MPC · JPL
380737	2005 SD_{39}	—	September 24, 2005	Kitt Peak	Spacewatch	NYS	1.1 km	MPC · JPL
380738	2005 SM_{49}	—	September 24, 2005	Kitt Peak	Spacewatch	MAS	870 m	MPC · JPL
380739	2005 SA_{72}	—	September 23, 2005	Catalina	CSS	·	1.5 km	MPC · JPL
380740	2005 SK_{87}	—	September 24, 2005	Kitt Peak	Spacewatch	MAS	900 m	MPC · JPL
380741	2005 SM_{89}	—	September 24, 2005	Kitt Peak	Spacewatch	MAR	1.0 km	MPC · JPL
380742	2005 SW_{97}	—	September 25, 2005	Kitt Peak	Spacewatch	·	1.5 km	MPC · JPL
380743	2005 SR_{102}	—	September 25, 2005	Kitt Peak	Spacewatch	·	2.2 km	MPC · JPL
380744	2005 SU_{110}	—	September 26, 2005	Kitt Peak	Spacewatch	·	1.1 km	MPC · JPL
380745	2005 SW_{114}	—	September 27, 2005	Kitt Peak	Spacewatch	NYS	1.0 km	MPC · JPL
380746	2005 SF_{116}	—	September 27, 2005	Kitt Peak	Spacewatch	MAS	690 m	MPC · JPL
380747	2005 SV_{123}	—	September 29, 2005	Anderson Mesa	LONEOS	NYS	1.1 km	MPC · JPL
380748	2005 SH_{139}	—	September 25, 2005	Kitt Peak	Spacewatch	MAS	780 m	MPC · JPL
380749	2005 SE_{143}	—	September 25, 2005	Kitt Peak	Spacewatch	·	1.8 km	MPC · JPL
380750	2005 SA_{144}	—	September 25, 2005	Kitt Peak	Spacewatch	·	1.4 km	MPC · JPL
380751	2005 SF_{145}	—	September 25, 2005	Kitt Peak	Spacewatch	·	900 m	MPC · JPL
380752	2005 SO_{159}	—	September 26, 2005	Palomar	NEAT	·	1.6 km	MPC · JPL
380753	2005 SC_{160}	—	September 27, 2005	Kitt Peak	Spacewatch	NYS	1.2 km	MPC · JPL
380754	2005 SS_{190}	—	September 29, 2005	Anderson Mesa	LONEOS	NYS	1.3 km	MPC · JPL
380755	2005 SG_{200}	—	September 30, 2005	Kitt Peak	Spacewatch	MAS	770 m	MPC · JPL
380756	2005 SU_{253}	—	September 22, 2005	Palomar	NEAT	MAS	770 m	MPC · JPL
380757	2005 ST_{261}	—	September 22, 2005	Palomar	NEAT	·	1.6 km	MPC · JPL
380758	2005 SG_{268}	—	September 30, 2005	Palomar	NEAT	·	1.4 km	MPC · JPL
380759	2005 TL_{5}	—	October 1, 2005	Catalina	CSS	·	1.7 km	MPC · JPL
380760	2005 TK_{43}	—	October 5, 2005	Socorro	LINEAR	MAS	830 m	MPC · JPL
380761	2005 TN_{63}	—	October 6, 2005	Kitt Peak	Spacewatch	ERI	1.4 km	MPC · JPL
380762	2005 TW_{71}	—	October 3, 2005	Catalina	CSS	PHO	2.9 km	MPC · JPL
380763	2005 TQ_{87}	—	October 5, 2005	Kitt Peak	Spacewatch	NYS	1.1 km	MPC · JPL
380764	2005 TM_{116}	—	October 7, 2005	Kitt Peak	Spacewatch	·	1.2 km	MPC · JPL
380765	2005 TM_{127}	—	October 7, 2005	Kitt Peak	Spacewatch	·	1.1 km	MPC · JPL
380766	2005 TZ_{138}	—	October 8, 2005	Kitt Peak	Spacewatch	·	1.1 km	MPC · JPL
380767	2005 TA_{153}	—	October 6, 2005	Mount Lemmon	Mount Lemmon Survey	MAS	880 m	MPC · JPL
380768	2005 TW_{188}	—	October 13, 2005	Kitt Peak	Spacewatch	·	1.3 km	MPC · JPL
380769	2005 UZ_{65}	—	October 22, 2005	Catalina	CSS	V	950 m	MPC · JPL
380770	2005 US_{90}	—	October 22, 2005	Kitt Peak	Spacewatch	·	1.4 km	MPC · JPL
380771	2005 UW_{209}	—	October 27, 2005	Mount Lemmon	Mount Lemmon Survey	NYS	1.2 km	MPC · JPL
380772	2005 UZ_{215}	—	October 25, 2005	Kitt Peak	Spacewatch	·	1.1 km	MPC · JPL
380773	2005 UF_{223}	—	October 25, 2005	Kitt Peak	Spacewatch	·	1.5 km	MPC · JPL
380774	2005 UX_{242}	—	October 25, 2005	Kitt Peak	Spacewatch	·	2.0 km	MPC · JPL
380775	2005 UW_{315}	—	October 25, 2005	Kitt Peak	Spacewatch	MAS	680 m	MPC · JPL
380776	2005 UW_{328}	—	October 28, 2005	Mount Lemmon	Mount Lemmon Survey	V	790 m	MPC · JPL
380777	2005 UZ_{349}	—	October 27, 2005	Catalina	CSS	·	2.0 km	MPC · JPL
380778	2005 UO_{353}	—	October 29, 2005	Catalina	CSS	·	1.4 km	MPC · JPL
380779	2005 UF_{403}	—	October 28, 2005	Kitt Peak	Spacewatch	3:2 · SHU	5.1 km	MPC · JPL
380780	2005 UT_{510}	—	October 25, 2005	Mount Lemmon	Mount Lemmon Survey	·	1.6 km	MPC · JPL
380781	2005 UN_{513}	—	October 28, 2005	Kitt Peak	Spacewatch	3:2	4.0 km	MPC · JPL
380782	2005 UT_{513}	—	October 23, 2005	Kitt Peak	Spacewatch	3:2	3.2 km	MPC · JPL
380783	2005 UD_{521}	—	October 26, 2005	Apache Point	A. C. Becker	·	1.5 km	MPC · JPL
380784	2005 UO_{531}	—	October 29, 2005	Catalina	CSS	H	660 m	MPC · JPL
380785	2005 VW_{5}	—	November 6, 2005	Eskridge	G. Hug	·	820 m	MPC · JPL
380786	2005 VF_{88}	—	November 6, 2005	Kitt Peak	Spacewatch	3:2	6.2 km	MPC · JPL
380787	2005 VH_{119}	—	November 4, 2005	Mount Lemmon	Mount Lemmon Survey	H	460 m	MPC · JPL
380788	2005 VD_{135}	—	November 1, 2005	Mount Lemmon	Mount Lemmon Survey	3:2 · SHU	4.9 km	MPC · JPL
380789	2005 WT_{4}	—	November 20, 2005	Catalina	CSS	·	2.1 km	MPC · JPL
380790	2005 WJ_{17}	—	November 22, 2005	Kitt Peak	Spacewatch	MAR	1.2 km	MPC · JPL
380791	2005 WV_{38}	—	November 22, 2005	Kitt Peak	Spacewatch	·	1.9 km	MPC · JPL
380792	2005 WG_{44}	—	November 21, 2005	Kitt Peak	Spacewatch	·	1.5 km	MPC · JPL
380793	2005 WQ_{45}	—	November 22, 2005	Kitt Peak	Spacewatch	T_{j} (2.99) · 3:2	4.7 km	MPC · JPL
380794	2005 WV_{47}	—	November 25, 2005	Kitt Peak	Spacewatch	·	1.3 km	MPC · JPL
380795	2005 WK_{60}	—	November 21, 2005	Kitt Peak	Spacewatch	·	810 m	MPC · JPL
380796	2005 WF_{101}	—	November 29, 2005	Socorro	LINEAR	3:2	5.6 km	MPC · JPL
380797	2005 WU_{133}	—	November 25, 2005	Mount Lemmon	Mount Lemmon Survey	·	1.0 km	MPC · JPL
380798	2005 WF_{142}	—	November 29, 2005	Kitt Peak	Spacewatch	·	1.0 km	MPC · JPL
380799	2005 WE_{146}	—	November 25, 2005	Kitt Peak	Spacewatch	·	1.0 km	MPC · JPL
380800	2005 WH_{153}	—	November 29, 2005	Palomar	NEAT	H	800 m	MPC · JPL

== 380801–380900 ==
back to top

Designation			Discovery			Properties		Ref
Permanent	Provisional	Named after	Date	Site	Discoverer(s)	Category	Diam.	Ref
380801	2005 WA_{164}	—	November 29, 2005	Kitt Peak	Spacewatch	·	950 m	MPC · JPL
380802	2005 WC_{166}	—	November 29, 2005	Kitt Peak	Spacewatch	·	780 m	MPC · JPL
380803	2005 WK_{177}	—	November 30, 2005	Kitt Peak	Spacewatch	·	1.4 km	MPC · JPL
380804	2005 XC_{43}	—	December 2, 2005	Kitt Peak	Spacewatch	·	1.3 km	MPC · JPL
380805	2005 XF_{81}	—	December 7, 2005	Kitt Peak	Spacewatch	·	1.1 km	MPC · JPL
380806	2005 YW_{6}	—	December 21, 2005	Kitt Peak	Spacewatch	(5)	810 m	MPC · JPL
380807	2005 YJ_{23}	—	December 4, 2005	Mount Lemmon	Mount Lemmon Survey	·	1.8 km	MPC · JPL
380808	2005 YN_{29}	—	December 24, 2005	Kitt Peak	Spacewatch	·	1.4 km	MPC · JPL
380809	2005 YG_{38}	—	December 21, 2005	Catalina	CSS	·	1.5 km	MPC · JPL
380810	2005 YL_{50}	—	December 25, 2005	Anderson Mesa	LONEOS	H	670 m	MPC · JPL
380811	2005 YS_{53}	—	December 22, 2005	Kitt Peak	Spacewatch	·	1.4 km	MPC · JPL
380812	2005 YS_{56}	—	December 24, 2005	Kitt Peak	Spacewatch	·	1.2 km	MPC · JPL
380813	2005 YU_{60}	—	December 22, 2005	Kitt Peak	Spacewatch	·	1.3 km	MPC · JPL
380814	2005 YQ_{86}	—	December 25, 2005	Mount Lemmon	Mount Lemmon Survey	·	1.5 km	MPC · JPL
380815	2005 YW_{98}	—	December 27, 2005	Catalina	CSS	H	670 m	MPC · JPL
380816	2005 YZ_{99}	—	December 28, 2005	Kitt Peak	Spacewatch	·	1.3 km	MPC · JPL
380817	2005 YM_{126}	—	December 26, 2005	Kitt Peak	Spacewatch	·	860 m	MPC · JPL
380818	2005 YV_{128}	—	December 30, 2005	Siding Spring	SSS	ATE	260 m	MPC · JPL
380819	2005 YV_{134}	—	December 26, 2005	Kitt Peak	Spacewatch	·	1.4 km	MPC · JPL
380820	2005 YB_{138}	—	December 26, 2005	Kitt Peak	Spacewatch	·	1.5 km	MPC · JPL
380821	2005 YQ_{143}	—	December 28, 2005	Mount Lemmon	Mount Lemmon Survey	·	1.4 km	MPC · JPL
380822	2005 YD_{168}	—	December 28, 2005	Kitt Peak	Spacewatch	·	1.1 km	MPC · JPL
380823	2005 YT_{185}	—	December 29, 2005	Kitt Peak	Spacewatch	·	1.4 km	MPC · JPL
380824	2005 YL_{207}	—	December 28, 2005	Mount Lemmon	Mount Lemmon Survey	·	1.5 km	MPC · JPL
380825	2005 YC_{208}	—	December 26, 2005	Catalina	CSS	·	1.1 km	MPC · JPL
380826	2005 YP_{219}	—	December 30, 2005	Catalina	CSS	·	1.5 km	MPC · JPL
380827	2005 YE_{221}	—	December 25, 2005	Catalina	CSS	·	2.0 km	MPC · JPL
380828	2005 YV_{228}	—	December 25, 2005	Mount Lemmon	Mount Lemmon Survey	ADE	2.6 km	MPC · JPL
380829	2005 YD_{238}	—	December 29, 2005	Kitt Peak	Spacewatch	(5)	1.2 km	MPC · JPL
380830	2005 YE_{288}	—	December 30, 2005	Catalina	CSS	·	1.9 km	MPC · JPL
380831	2005 YY_{290}	—	December 29, 2005	Kitt Peak	Spacewatch	·	1.3 km	MPC · JPL
380832 Annecambridge	2006 AC	Annecambridge	January 3, 2006	Mayhill	Lowe, A.	·	1.6 km	MPC · JPL
380833	2006 AN_{21}	—	January 5, 2006	Catalina	CSS	(5)	1.2 km	MPC · JPL
380834	2006 AO_{22}	—	January 5, 2006	Catalina	CSS	EUN	2.0 km	MPC · JPL
380835	2006 AE_{32}	—	January 5, 2006	Catalina	CSS	·	1.7 km	MPC · JPL
380836	2006 AL_{37}	—	January 4, 2006	Kitt Peak	Spacewatch	·	2.4 km	MPC · JPL
380837	2006 AY_{38}	—	January 7, 2006	Mount Lemmon	Mount Lemmon Survey	·	1.1 km	MPC · JPL
380838	2006 AD_{56}	—	January 6, 2006	Mount Lemmon	Mount Lemmon Survey	EUN	1.3 km	MPC · JPL
380839	2006 AP_{57}	—	January 8, 2006	Anderson Mesa	LONEOS	·	3.2 km	MPC · JPL
380840	2006 AK_{67}	—	January 9, 2006	Kitt Peak	Spacewatch	MAR	1.7 km	MPC · JPL
380841	2006 AG_{68}	—	January 5, 2006	Mount Lemmon	Mount Lemmon Survey	·	2.1 km	MPC · JPL
380842	2006 AA_{79}	—	January 6, 2006	Kitt Peak	Spacewatch	EUN	1.7 km	MPC · JPL
380843	2006 AY_{96}	—	November 29, 2005	Mount Lemmon	Mount Lemmon Survey	·	2.8 km	MPC · JPL
380844	2006 AG_{104}	—	January 6, 2006	Kitt Peak	Spacewatch	·	960 m	MPC · JPL
380845	2006 BC_{3}	—	January 21, 2006	Mount Lemmon	Mount Lemmon Survey	·	1.2 km	MPC · JPL
380846	2006 BN_{7}	—	January 22, 2006	Socorro	LINEAR	·	1.6 km	MPC · JPL
380847	2006 BX_{22}	—	January 22, 2006	Mount Lemmon	Mount Lemmon Survey	·	2.7 km	MPC · JPL
380848	2006 BO_{25}	—	January 23, 2006	Mount Lemmon	Mount Lemmon Survey	·	1.9 km	MPC · JPL
380849	2006 BW_{25}	—	January 19, 2006	Catalina	CSS	·	2.5 km	MPC · JPL
380850	2006 BW_{54}	—	January 23, 2006	7300	W. K. Y. Yeung	(194)	2.9 km	MPC · JPL
380851	2006 BQ_{75}	—	January 23, 2006	Kitt Peak	Spacewatch	·	1.9 km	MPC · JPL
380852	2006 BZ_{78}	—	January 23, 2006	Kitt Peak	Spacewatch	·	3.1 km	MPC · JPL
380853	2006 BT_{101}	—	January 23, 2006	Socorro	LINEAR	(5)	1.2 km	MPC · JPL
380854	2006 BN_{107}	—	January 25, 2006	Kitt Peak	Spacewatch	·	1.3 km	MPC · JPL
380855	2006 BZ_{120}	—	January 26, 2006	Kitt Peak	Spacewatch	(5)	1.2 km	MPC · JPL
380856	2006 BZ_{121}	—	January 26, 2006	Kitt Peak	Spacewatch	·	1.8 km	MPC · JPL
380857	2006 BG_{124}	—	January 26, 2006	Kitt Peak	Spacewatch	·	1.6 km	MPC · JPL
380858	2006 BY_{130}	—	January 26, 2006	Kitt Peak	Spacewatch	·	1.3 km	MPC · JPL
380859	2006 BN_{139}	—	January 28, 2006	Mount Lemmon	Mount Lemmon Survey	·	1.8 km	MPC · JPL
380860	2006 BL_{140}	—	January 22, 2006	Mount Lemmon	Mount Lemmon Survey	·	1.7 km	MPC · JPL
380861	2006 BR_{150}	—	January 25, 2006	Kitt Peak	Spacewatch	·	1.0 km	MPC · JPL
380862	2006 BZ_{154}	—	January 25, 2006	Kitt Peak	Spacewatch	·	1.7 km	MPC · JPL
380863	2006 BJ_{158}	—	January 25, 2006	Kitt Peak	Spacewatch	·	1.8 km	MPC · JPL
380864	2006 BE_{182}	—	January 27, 2006	Mount Lemmon	Mount Lemmon Survey	(11882)	1.5 km	MPC · JPL
380865	2006 BF_{217}	—	January 27, 2006	Anderson Mesa	LONEOS	·	2.0 km	MPC · JPL
380866	2006 BP_{217}	—	January 28, 2006	Catalina	CSS	·	2.6 km	MPC · JPL
380867	2006 BV_{221}	—	January 30, 2006	Kitt Peak	Spacewatch	·	1.8 km	MPC · JPL
380868	2006 BC_{241}	—	January 31, 2006	Kitt Peak	Spacewatch	·	1.6 km	MPC · JPL
380869	2006 BF_{253}	—	January 31, 2006	Kitt Peak	Spacewatch	·	1.4 km	MPC · JPL
380870	2006 BZ_{274}	—	January 25, 2006	Kitt Peak	Spacewatch	·	1.9 km	MPC · JPL
380871	2006 BD_{275}	—	January 26, 2006	Mount Lemmon	Mount Lemmon Survey	·	2.4 km	MPC · JPL
380872	2006 CK_{22}	—	February 1, 2006	Kitt Peak	Spacewatch	·	2.4 km	MPC · JPL
380873	2006 CW_{22}	—	February 1, 2006	Mount Lemmon	Mount Lemmon Survey	·	2.5 km	MPC · JPL
380874	2006 CS_{44}	—	February 3, 2006	Kitt Peak	Spacewatch	·	1.4 km	MPC · JPL
380875	2006 CU_{59}	—	February 6, 2006	Mount Lemmon	Mount Lemmon Survey	·	1.6 km	MPC · JPL
380876	2006 CW_{65}	—	February 4, 2006	Catalina	CSS	·	3.5 km	MPC · JPL
380877	2006 DE	—	February 20, 2006	Mayhill	Lowe, A.	·	3.3 km	MPC · JPL
380878	2006 DF_{9}	—	January 23, 2006	Kitt Peak	Spacewatch	·	1.6 km	MPC · JPL
380879	2006 DJ_{10}	—	February 20, 2006	Kitt Peak	Spacewatch	(5)	1.4 km	MPC · JPL
380880	2006 DX_{17}	—	January 23, 2006	Kitt Peak	Spacewatch	·	3.2 km	MPC · JPL
380881	2006 DA_{19}	—	February 1, 2006	Kitt Peak	Spacewatch	·	3.0 km	MPC · JPL
380882	2006 DY_{19}	—	February 20, 2006	Kitt Peak	Spacewatch	·	1.7 km	MPC · JPL
380883	2006 DO_{22}	—	February 20, 2006	Kitt Peak	Spacewatch	·	2.2 km	MPC · JPL
380884	2006 DB_{39}	—	February 21, 2006	Mount Lemmon	Mount Lemmon Survey	·	1.3 km	MPC · JPL
380885	2006 DD_{40}	—	February 22, 2006	Palomar	NEAT	·	1.6 km	MPC · JPL
380886	2006 DE_{41}	—	February 23, 2006	Anderson Mesa	LONEOS	EUN	1.8 km	MPC · JPL
380887	2006 DZ_{41}	—	February 24, 2006	Socorro	LINEAR	·	1.5 km	MPC · JPL
380888	2006 DS_{42}	—	February 20, 2006	Kitt Peak	Spacewatch	·	1.6 km	MPC · JPL
380889	2006 DV_{48}	—	February 21, 2006	Mount Lemmon	Mount Lemmon Survey	·	2.8 km	MPC · JPL
380890	2006 DT_{49}	—	February 22, 2006	Anderson Mesa	LONEOS	·	2.8 km	MPC · JPL
380891	2006 DT_{54}	—	February 24, 2006	Kitt Peak	Spacewatch	·	2.1 km	MPC · JPL
380892	2006 DA_{68}	—	February 24, 2006	Palomar	NEAT	JUN	1.2 km	MPC · JPL
380893	2006 DB_{89}	—	February 24, 2006	Kitt Peak	Spacewatch	L5	9.0 km	MPC · JPL
380894	2006 DE_{90}	—	February 24, 2006	Kitt Peak	Spacewatch	·	2.0 km	MPC · JPL
380895	2006 DT_{99}	—	January 31, 2006	Kitt Peak	Spacewatch	AGN	1.1 km	MPC · JPL
380896	2006 DE_{111}	—	February 26, 2006	Anderson Mesa	LONEOS	·	3.1 km	MPC · JPL
380897	2006 DZ_{111}	—	February 27, 2006	Mount Lemmon	Mount Lemmon Survey	·	2.9 km	MPC · JPL
380898	2006 DX_{112}	—	February 27, 2006	Kitt Peak	Spacewatch	526	2.8 km	MPC · JPL
380899	2006 DS_{115}	—	February 27, 2006	Kitt Peak	Spacewatch	·	1.5 km	MPC · JPL
380900	2006 DB_{121}	—	February 22, 2006	Catalina	CSS	·	2.0 km	MPC · JPL

== 380901–381000 ==
back to top

Designation			Discovery			Properties		Ref
Permanent	Provisional	Named after	Date	Site	Discoverer(s)	Category	Diam.	Ref
380901	2006 DX_{126}	—	February 25, 2006	Kitt Peak	Spacewatch	·	2.1 km	MPC · JPL
380902	2006 DM_{133}	—	February 25, 2006	Kitt Peak	Spacewatch	·	3.2 km	MPC · JPL
380903	2006 DN_{145}	—	February 25, 2006	Mount Lemmon	Mount Lemmon Survey	NEM	2.1 km	MPC · JPL
380904	2006 DF_{156}	—	February 27, 2006	Kitt Peak	Spacewatch	·	2.6 km	MPC · JPL
380905	2006 DT_{173}	—	February 27, 2006	Kitt Peak	Spacewatch	·	2.4 km	MPC · JPL
380906	2006 DB_{179}	—	February 27, 2006	Socorro	LINEAR	·	2.0 km	MPC · JPL
380907	2006 DC_{188}	—	February 27, 2006	Kitt Peak	Spacewatch	·	3.1 km	MPC · JPL
380908	2006 DO_{193}	—	February 28, 2006	Mount Lemmon	Mount Lemmon Survey	H	590 m	MPC · JPL
380909	2006 DO_{195}	—	February 20, 2006	Catalina	CSS	·	1.7 km	MPC · JPL
380910	2006 DO_{213}	—	February 28, 2006	Mount Lemmon	Mount Lemmon Survey	·	2.2 km	MPC · JPL
380911	2006 DA_{217}	—	February 25, 2006	Kitt Peak	Spacewatch	·	2.1 km	MPC · JPL
380912	2006 EY_{7}	—	March 2, 2006	Kitt Peak	Spacewatch	AST	1.5 km	MPC · JPL
380913	2006 ED_{25}	—	March 3, 2006	Kitt Peak	Spacewatch	·	1.6 km	MPC · JPL
380914	2006 EE_{30}	—	March 3, 2006	Mount Lemmon	Mount Lemmon Survey	·	1.2 km	MPC · JPL
380915	2006 EW_{40}	—	March 4, 2006	Mount Lemmon	Mount Lemmon Survey	AST	1.9 km	MPC · JPL
380916	2006 EL_{73}	—	March 2, 2006	Kitt Peak	Spacewatch	HOF	2.7 km	MPC · JPL
380917	2006 EU_{73}	—	March 3, 2006	Kitt Peak	Spacewatch	T_{j} (2.99) · 3:2	7.4 km	MPC · JPL
380918	2006 FM_{20}	—	March 23, 2006	Mount Lemmon	Mount Lemmon Survey	·	2.3 km	MPC · JPL
380919	2006 FF_{27}	—	March 24, 2006	Mount Lemmon	Mount Lemmon Survey	·	2.3 km	MPC · JPL
380920	2006 FO_{51}	—	March 29, 2006	Socorro	LINEAR	T_{j} (2.98)	4.8 km	MPC · JPL
380921	2006 GP_{2}	—	April 2, 2006	Kitt Peak	Spacewatch	·	2.6 km	MPC · JPL
380922	2006 GG_{7}	—	April 2, 2006	Kitt Peak	Spacewatch	·	1.5 km	MPC · JPL
380923	2006 GL_{20}	—	April 2, 2006	Kitt Peak	Spacewatch	·	1.9 km	MPC · JPL
380924	2006 GT_{35}	—	April 7, 2006	Catalina	CSS	·	2.4 km	MPC · JPL
380925	2006 GO_{43}	—	April 2, 2006	Kitt Peak	Spacewatch	·	2.0 km	MPC · JPL
380926	2006 HA	—	April 17, 2006	Mayhill	Lowe, A.	·	2.2 km	MPC · JPL
380927	2006 HA_{2}	—	April 18, 2006	Palomar	NEAT	JUN	1.6 km	MPC · JPL
380928	2006 HJ_{3}	—	April 18, 2006	Kitt Peak	Spacewatch	·	1.1 km	MPC · JPL
380929	2006 HU_{30}	—	April 25, 2006	Catalina	CSS	APO	420 m	MPC · JPL
380930	2006 HA_{31}	—	April 20, 2006	Lulin	Q. Ye	·	2.0 km	MPC · JPL
380931	2006 HE_{61}	—	April 22, 2006	Siding Spring	SSS	·	4.0 km	MPC · JPL
380932	2006 HQ_{73}	—	April 25, 2006	Kitt Peak	Spacewatch	NAE	2.4 km	MPC · JPL
380933	2006 HD_{74}	—	April 25, 2006	Kitt Peak	Spacewatch	·	2.2 km	MPC · JPL
380934	2006 HX_{75}	—	April 25, 2006	Kitt Peak	Spacewatch	·	2.6 km	MPC · JPL
380935	2006 HM_{82}	—	April 26, 2006	Kitt Peak	Spacewatch	·	2.1 km	MPC · JPL
380936	2006 HY_{87}	—	April 30, 2006	Kitt Peak	Spacewatch	·	2.5 km	MPC · JPL
380937	2006 JR_{9}	—	May 1, 2006	Kitt Peak	Spacewatch	·	2.0 km	MPC · JPL
380938	2006 JZ_{31}	—	May 3, 2006	Kitt Peak	Spacewatch	·	2.2 km	MPC · JPL
380939	2006 JV_{36}	—	April 25, 2006	Kitt Peak	Spacewatch	·	1.8 km	MPC · JPL
380940	2006 JX_{43}	—	April 24, 2006	Kitt Peak	Spacewatch	KOR	1.3 km	MPC · JPL
380941	2006 JR_{46}	—	May 7, 2006	Kitt Peak	Spacewatch	·	4.7 km	MPC · JPL
380942	2006 KP_{2}	—	May 18, 2006	Catalina	CSS	·	1.5 km	MPC · JPL
380943	2006 KG_{12}	—	May 20, 2006	Kitt Peak	Spacewatch	·	4.0 km	MPC · JPL
380944	2006 KD_{16}	—	May 20, 2006	Palomar	NEAT	BRA	1.8 km	MPC · JPL
380945	2006 KS_{22}	—	May 20, 2006	Catalina	CSS	·	3.7 km	MPC · JPL
380946	2006 KX_{26}	—	May 20, 2006	Kitt Peak	Spacewatch	·	2.5 km	MPC · JPL
380947	2006 KL_{33}	—	May 20, 2006	Kitt Peak	Spacewatch	GEF	1.6 km	MPC · JPL
380948	2006 KR_{41}	—	May 19, 2006	Palomar	NEAT	·	4.2 km	MPC · JPL
380949	2006 KL_{57}	—	May 22, 2006	Kitt Peak	Spacewatch	·	1.9 km	MPC · JPL
380950	2006 KB_{67}	—	May 24, 2006	Mount Lemmon	Mount Lemmon Survey	·	2.1 km	MPC · JPL
380951	2006 KQ_{83}	—	May 20, 2006	Kitt Peak	Spacewatch	EMA	3.1 km	MPC · JPL
380952	2006 KV_{96}	—	May 25, 2006	Kitt Peak	Spacewatch	EOS	2.7 km	MPC · JPL
380953	2006 KQ_{123}	—	May 30, 2006	Mount Lemmon	Mount Lemmon Survey	·	600 m	MPC · JPL
380954	2006 KR_{124}	—	May 30, 2006	Mount Lemmon	Mount Lemmon Survey	·	1.8 km	MPC · JPL
380955	2006 MS_{11}	—	April 21, 2006	Kitt Peak	Spacewatch	·	2.8 km	MPC · JPL
380956	2006 PW_{9}	—	August 13, 2006	Palomar	NEAT	·	1.0 km	MPC · JPL
380957	2006 PD_{11}	—	August 13, 2006	Palomar	NEAT	·	4.0 km	MPC · JPL
380958	2006 QD_{11}	—	August 21, 2006	Kitt Peak	Spacewatch	CYB	2.8 km	MPC · JPL
380959	2006 QF_{22}	—	August 21, 2006	Palomar	NEAT	·	4.3 km	MPC · JPL
380960	2006 QW_{31}	—	July 21, 2006	Catalina	CSS	·	700 m	MPC · JPL
380961	2006 QX_{35}	—	August 17, 2006	Palomar	NEAT	·	800 m	MPC · JPL
380962	2006 QW_{42}	—	August 17, 2006	Palomar	NEAT	·	800 m	MPC · JPL
380963	2006 QV_{59}	—	August 19, 2006	Palomar	NEAT	·	780 m	MPC · JPL
380964	2006 QQ_{75}	—	August 21, 2006	Kitt Peak	Spacewatch	·	3.2 km	MPC · JPL
380965	2006 QS_{117}	—	August 28, 2006	Catalina	CSS	·	690 m	MPC · JPL
380966	2006 QZ_{141}	—	August 18, 2006	Palomar	NEAT	·	760 m	MPC · JPL
380967	2006 QT_{161}	—	August 19, 2006	Kitt Peak	Spacewatch	·	650 m	MPC · JPL
380968	2006 RQ_{39}	—	September 12, 2006	Catalina	CSS	·	800 m	MPC · JPL
380969	2006 RW_{62}	—	September 14, 2006	Catalina	CSS	·	790 m	MPC · JPL
380970	2006 RF_{70}	—	September 15, 2006	Kitt Peak	Spacewatch	·	590 m	MPC · JPL
380971	2006 RG_{72}	—	September 15, 2006	Kitt Peak	Spacewatch	·	710 m	MPC · JPL
380972	2006 RK_{93}	—	September 15, 2006	Kitt Peak	Spacewatch	·	3.0 km	MPC · JPL
380973	2006 SC_{20}	—	September 18, 2006	Kitt Peak	Spacewatch	·	780 m	MPC · JPL
380974	2006 SC_{24}	—	September 18, 2006	Catalina	CSS	·	1.1 km	MPC · JPL
380975	2006 SA_{29}	—	August 29, 2006	Catalina	CSS	·	610 m	MPC · JPL
380976	2006 SW_{33}	—	September 17, 2006	Catalina	CSS	·	770 m	MPC · JPL
380977	2006 SD_{46}	—	September 18, 2006	Anderson Mesa	LONEOS	·	740 m	MPC · JPL
380978	2006 SY_{49}	—	September 20, 2006	La Sagra	OAM	·	600 m	MPC · JPL
380979	2006 SG_{56}	—	September 19, 2006	Catalina	CSS	·	920 m	MPC · JPL
380980	2006 SN_{110}	—	September 20, 2006	Catalina	CSS	·	1.2 km	MPC · JPL
380981	2006 SU_{131}	—	September 26, 2006	Catalina	CSS	AMO · PHA	660 m	MPC · JPL
380982	2006 SU_{133}	—	September 17, 2006	Kitt Peak	Spacewatch	·	680 m	MPC · JPL
380983	2006 SE_{136}	—	September 20, 2006	Catalina	CSS	·	870 m	MPC · JPL
380984	2006 SR_{160}	—	September 23, 2006	Kitt Peak	Spacewatch	·	710 m	MPC · JPL
380985	2006 SN_{209}	—	September 18, 2006	Catalina	CSS	·	690 m	MPC · JPL
380986	2006 SO_{222}	—	September 18, 2006	Kitt Peak	Spacewatch	·	560 m	MPC · JPL
380987	2006 SS_{285}	—	September 27, 2006	Mount Lemmon	Mount Lemmon Survey	·	910 m	MPC · JPL
380988	2006 SY_{320}	—	September 27, 2006	Kitt Peak	Spacewatch	·	830 m	MPC · JPL
380989	2006 SZ_{321}	—	September 27, 2006	Kitt Peak	Spacewatch	·	540 m	MPC · JPL
380990	2006 SO_{325}	—	September 27, 2006	Kitt Peak	Spacewatch	·	1.0 km	MPC · JPL
380991	2006 SO_{327}	—	September 27, 2006	Kitt Peak	Spacewatch	·	520 m	MPC · JPL
380992	2006 SJ_{332}	—	September 28, 2006	Mount Lemmon	Mount Lemmon Survey	·	750 m	MPC · JPL
380993	2006 SZ_{365}	—	September 30, 2006	Mount Lemmon	Mount Lemmon Survey	·	650 m	MPC · JPL
380994	2006 SJ_{400}	—	September 19, 2006	Catalina	CSS	PHO	960 m	MPC · JPL
380995	2006 TT_{19}	—	September 28, 2006	Mount Lemmon	Mount Lemmon Survey	·	810 m	MPC · JPL
380996	2006 TK_{20}	—	October 11, 2006	Kitt Peak	Spacewatch	·	1.1 km	MPC · JPL
380997	2006 TG_{42}	—	October 12, 2006	Kitt Peak	Spacewatch	·	760 m	MPC · JPL
380998	2006 TO_{42}	—	October 12, 2006	Kitt Peak	Spacewatch	·	630 m	MPC · JPL
380999	2006 TE_{43}	—	October 12, 2006	Kitt Peak	Spacewatch	·	790 m	MPC · JPL
381000	2006 TV_{57}	—	October 15, 2006	Catalina	CSS	·	920 m	MPC · JPL

back to top

== See also ==
- Meanings of minor-planet names: 380001–381000
