= European Space Security and Education Centre =

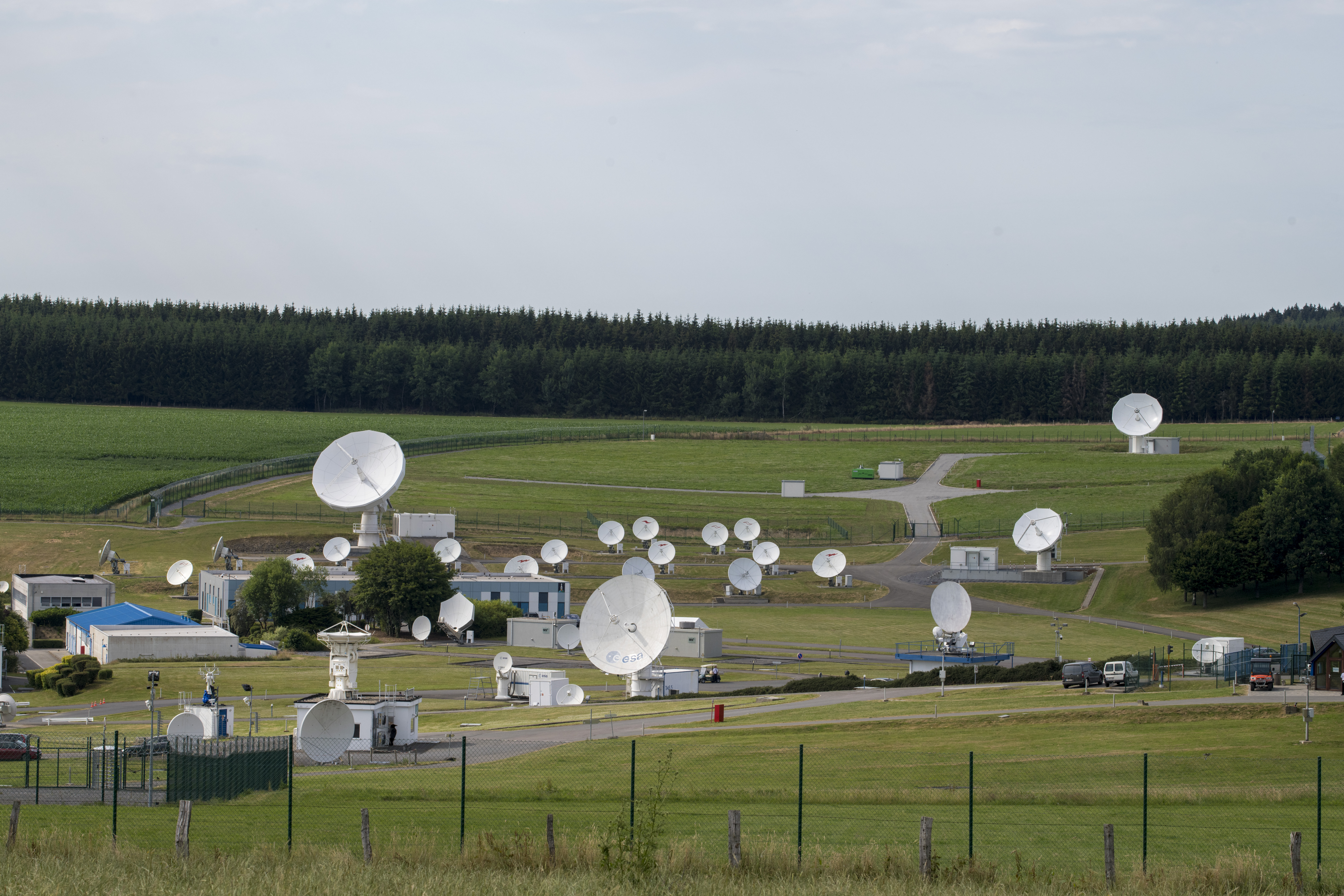
European Space Security and Education Centre

The European Space Security and Education Centre (ESEC) is a centre of excellence for space cybersecurity services of the European Space Agency (ESA), home to its Proba mission control centres, the Space Weather Data Centre, the Education Training Centre, and part of ESA's ground station network. It has been operational since January 1, 1968. The centre is located at Redu, Wallonia, Belgium.
