= European Space Agency =

European organisation dedicated to space exploration

- Czech: Evropská kosmická agentura; Danish: Den Europæiske Rumorganisation; German: Europäische Weltraumorganisation; Estonian: Euroopa Kosmoseagentuur; French: Agence spatiale européenne; Finnish: Euroopan avaruusjärjestö; Greek: Ευρωπαϊκός Οργανισμός Διαστήματος; Hungarian: Európai Űrügynökség; Irish: Gníomhaireacht Spáis na hEorpa; Italian: Agenzia Spaziale Europea; Luxembourgish: Europäesch Weltraumorganisatioun; Dutch: Europese Ruimtevaartorganisatie; Norwegian: Den europeiske romfartsorganisasjon; Polish: Europejska Agencja Kosmiczna; Portuguese: Agência Espacial Europeia; Romanian: Agenția Spațială Europeană; Romansh: Agenzia spaziala europeica; Slovene: Evropska vesoljska agencija; Spanish: Agencia Espacial Europea; Swedish: Europeiska rymdorganisationen
- ESA logo and patch

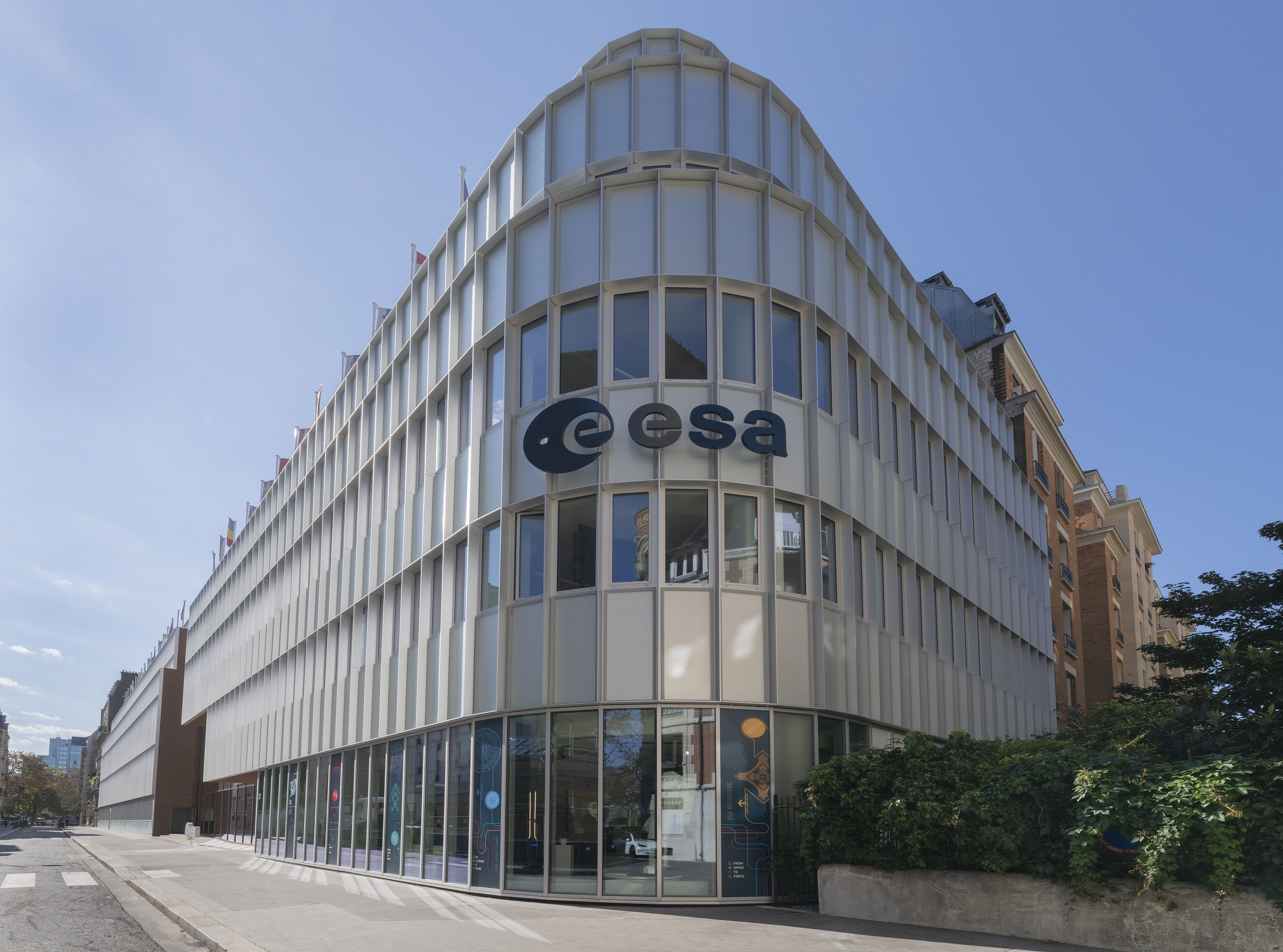
- European Space Agency headquarters in Paris

Agency overview
- Abbreviation: ESA; ASE; EW
- Formed: 30 May 1975; 51 years ago
- Type: Space agency
- Headquarters: Paris, France; 48°50′54″N 02°18′15″E
- Official languages: English, French and German (working languages)
- Director General: Josef Aschbacher
- Primary spaceport: Guiana Space Centre
- Owners: 23 members: Austria; Belgium; Czechia; Denmark; Estonia; Finland; France; Germany; Greece; Hungary; Ireland; Italy; Luxembourg; Netherlands; Norway; Poland; Portugal; Romania; Slovenia; Spain; Sweden; Switzerland; United Kingdom
- Employees: 3,000 (2025)
- Annual budget: ▲€8.26 billion (US$9.32 billion) (2026)
- Website: esa.int

The European Space Agency (Note: French: Agence spatiale européenne, Italian: Agenzia Spaziale Europea, Spanish: Agencia Espacial Europea ASE; German: Europäische Weltraumorganisation) (ESA; pronounced /ˈiːsə/ EE-sə) is a 23-member international organisation devoted to space exploration. It has its headquarters in Paris and a staff of around 3,000 people globally as of 2025. ESA was founded in 1975 in the context of European integration. Its 2026 annual budget was around €8.3 billion.

The ESA human spaceflight programme includes participation in the International Space Station (ISS) and collaboration with NASA on the Artemis programme, especially manufacturing of the Orion spacecraft's European Service Module (ESM). ESA launches and operates uncrewed missions to the Moon, Mars, Jupiter, Venus, Mercury, the Sun, and various comets and asteroids. Other activities include space telescopes, Earth observation satellites, asteroid impact avoidance, telecommunication and navigation satellites, designing launch vehicles (e.g. Ariane 6 is operated through Arianespace with ESA sharing in the costs), and maintaining Europe's spaceport (the Guiana Space Centre in Kourou, French Guiana), as well as space safety and commercialisation.

== Mission ==
The treaty establishing the European Space Agency reads:

"The purpose of the Agency shall be to provide for and to promote, for exclusively peaceful purposes, cooperation among European States in space research and technology and their space applications, with a view to their being used for scientific purposes and for operational space applications systems."

ESA is responsible for setting a unified space and related industrial policy, recommending space objectives to the member states, and integrating national programmes like satellite development, into the European programme as much as possible.

Jean-Jacques Dordain—ESA's Director General (2003–2015)—outlined the European Space Agency's mission in a 2003 interview:

"Today space activities have pursued the benefit of citizens, and citizens are asking for a better quality of life on Earth. They want greater security and economic wealth, but they also want to pursue their dreams, to increase their knowledge, and they want younger people to be attracted to the pursuit of science and technology.

I think that space can do all of this: it can produce a higher quality of life, better security, more economic wealth, and also fulfill our citizens' dreams and thirst for knowledge, and attract the young generation. This is the reason space exploration is an integral part of overall space activities. It has always been so, and it will be even more important in the future."

At the ministerial council of 2025, ESA member states widened the agency's mandate to include defence. The resolution reads:

"ESA's intergovernmental framework provides the credentials and tools for developing space technologies and systems [...] for security and defence and to implement corresponding activities."

== History ==
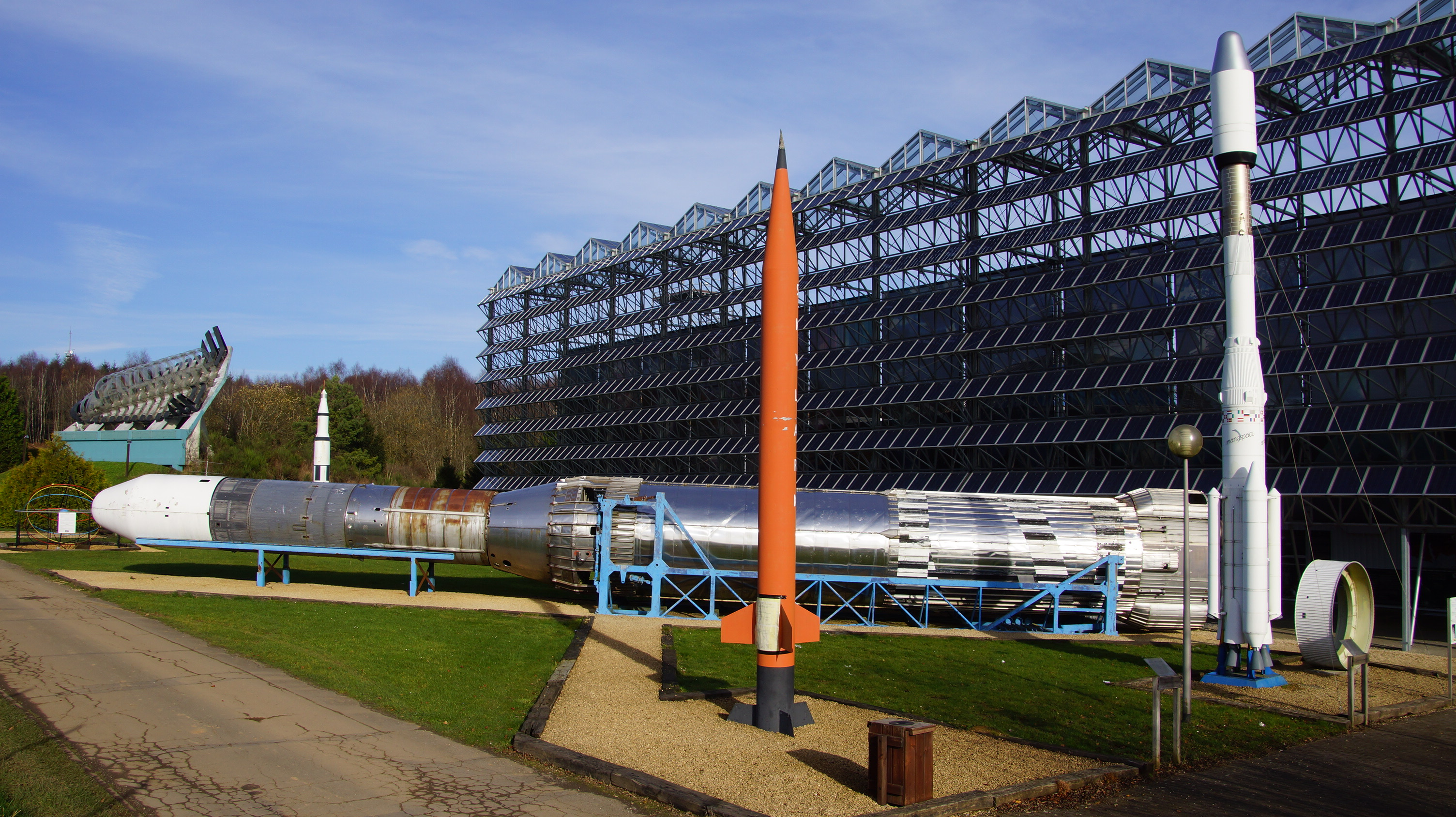
Europa II rocket (larger horizontal rocket in the background), Skylark sounding rocket (front centre-left), and a model of the Ariane 4 orbital rocket (to the right from Skylark) at Euro Space Center

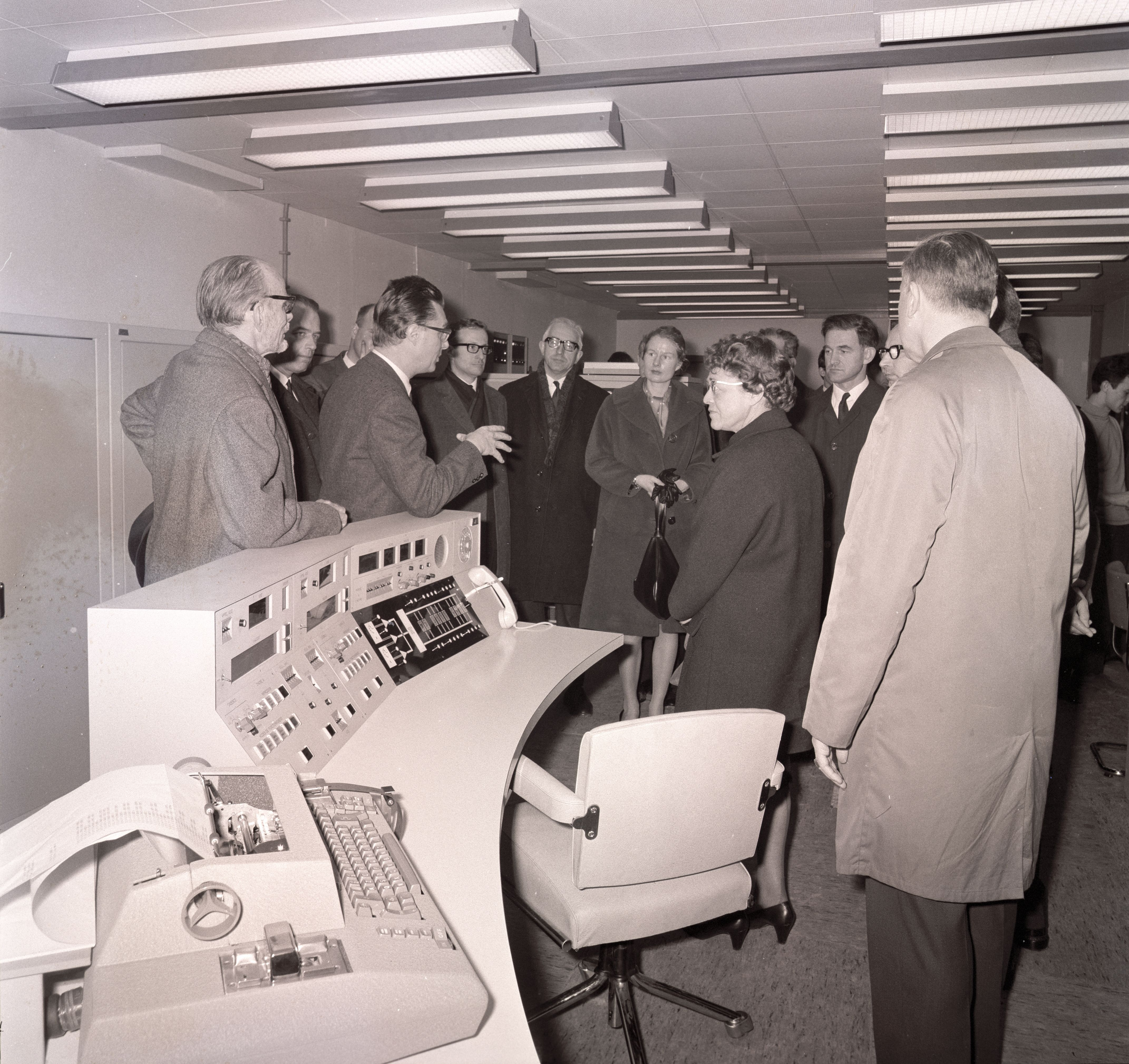
Pierre Auger (far left) visiting the European Space Research and Technology Centre ESTEC on 3 February 1967

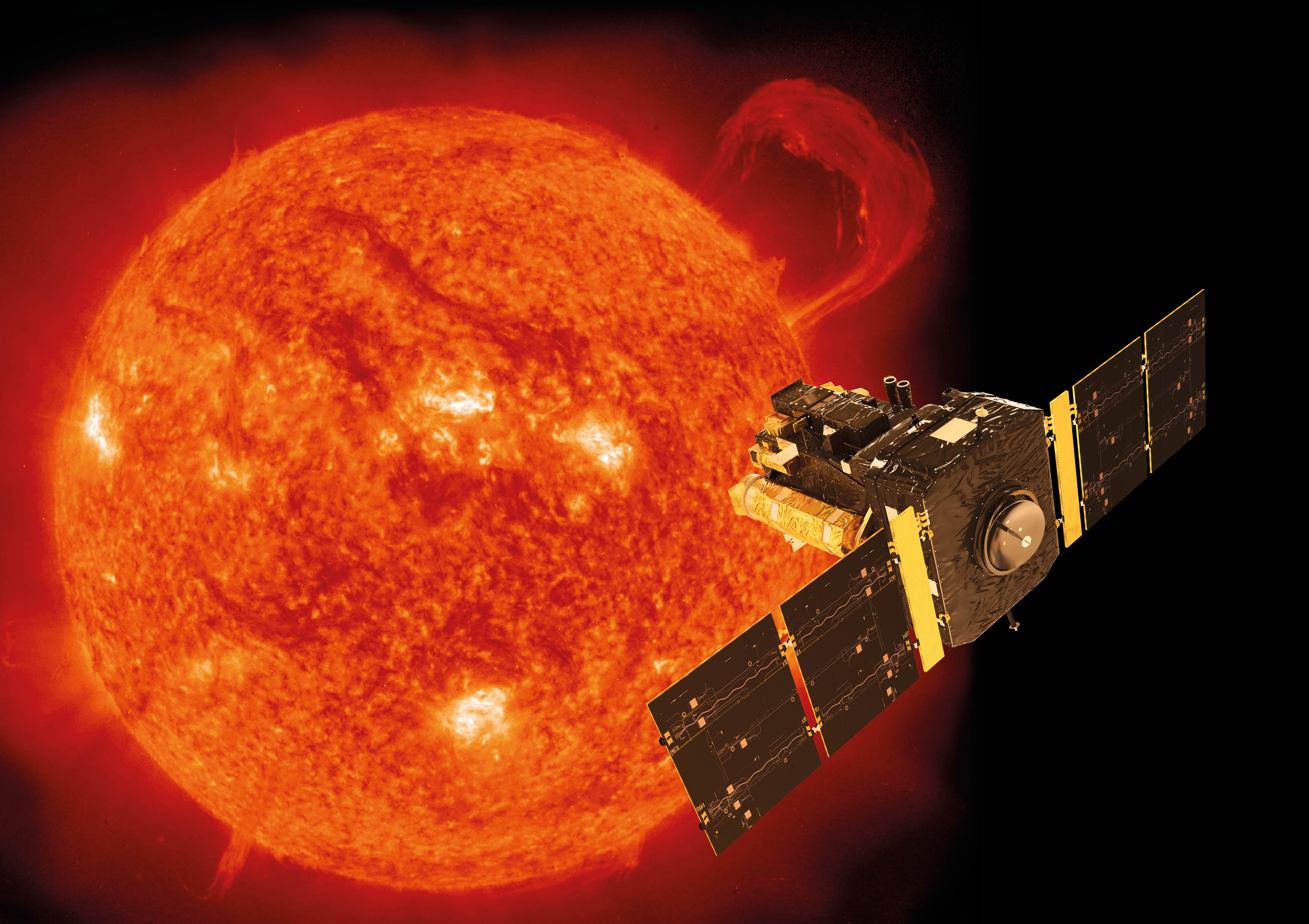
Solar and Heliospheric Observatory (SOHO) observing the Sun (artist's impression)

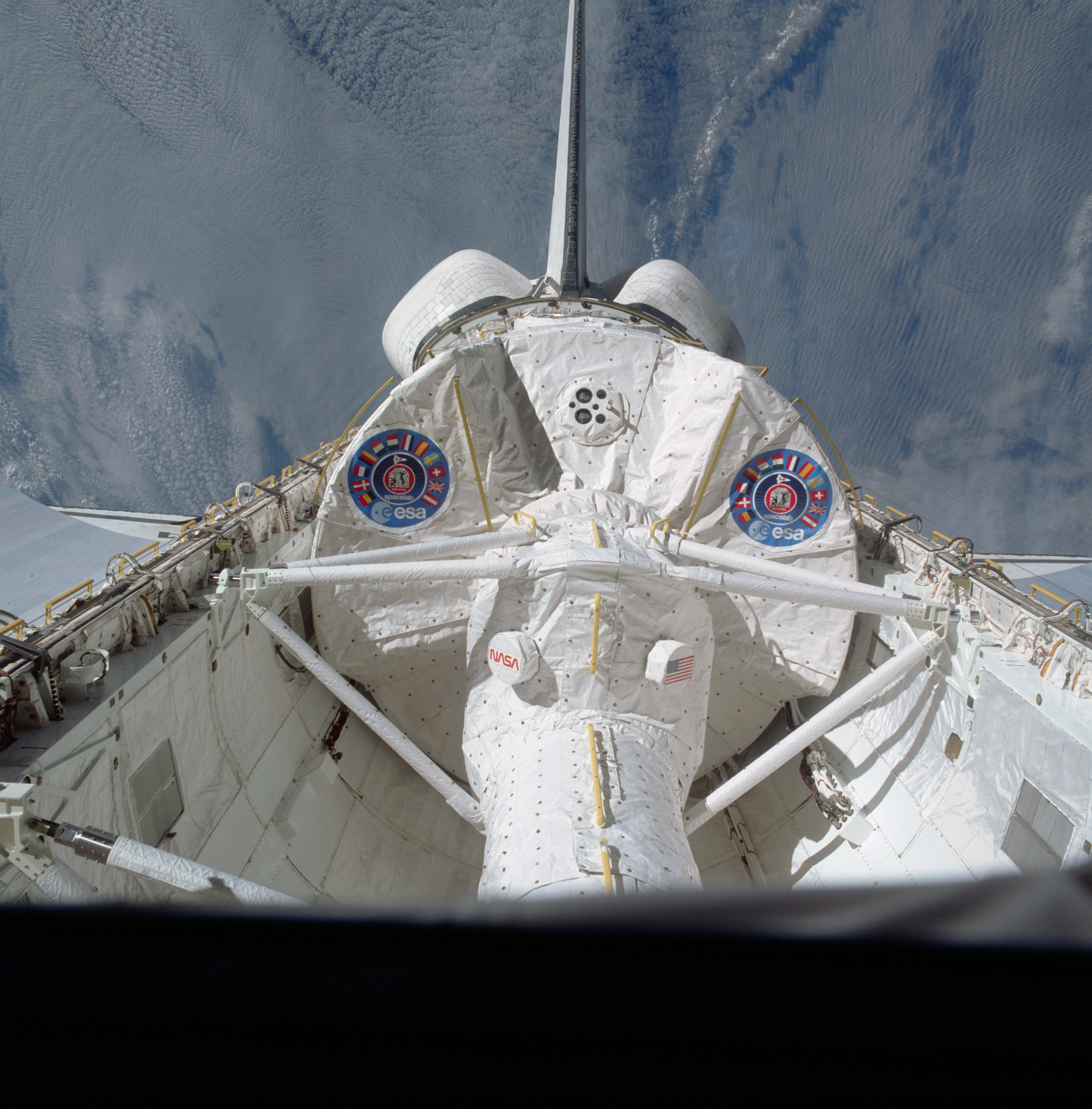
Spacelab on STS-9

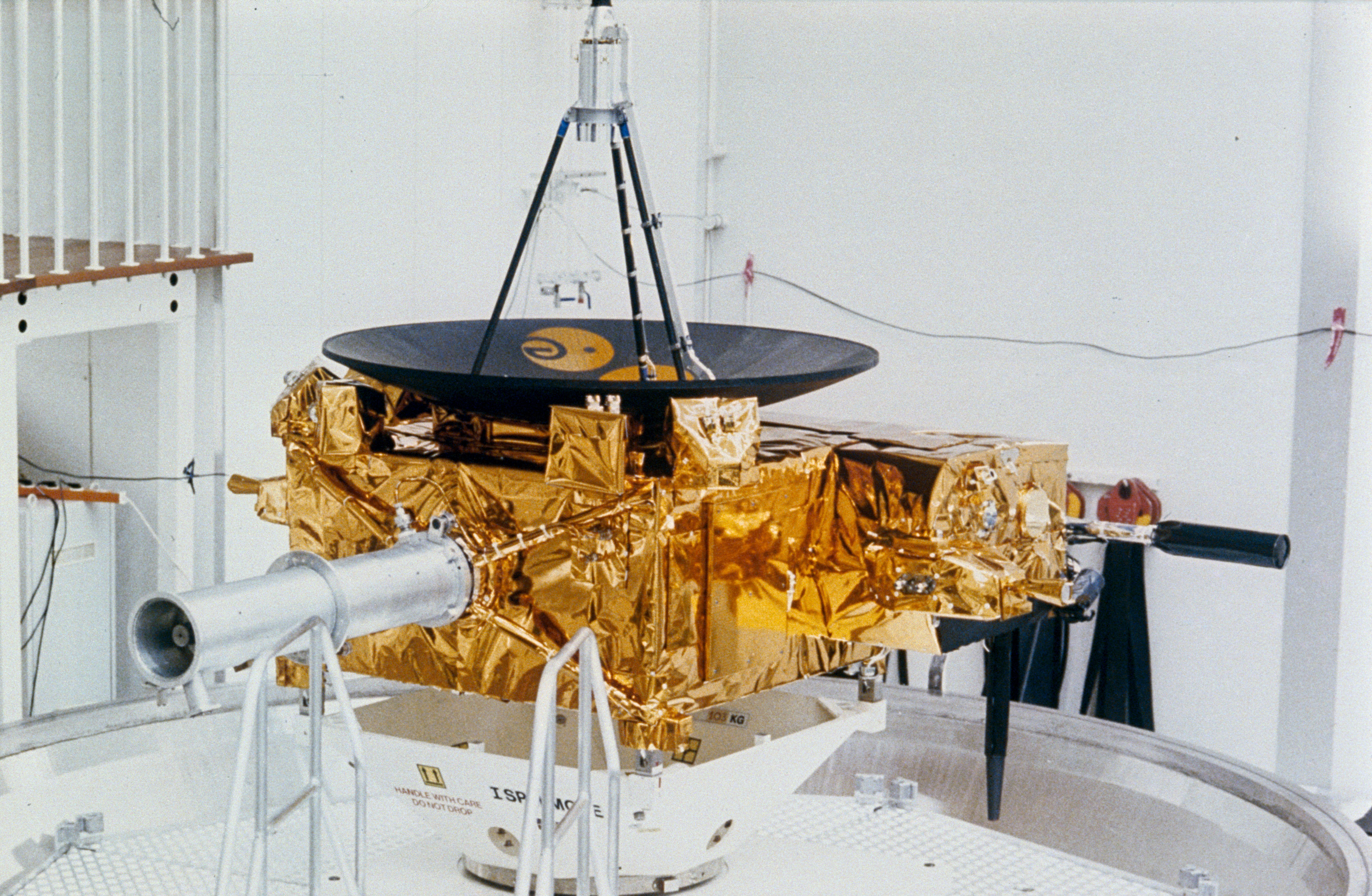
Ulysses spacecraft

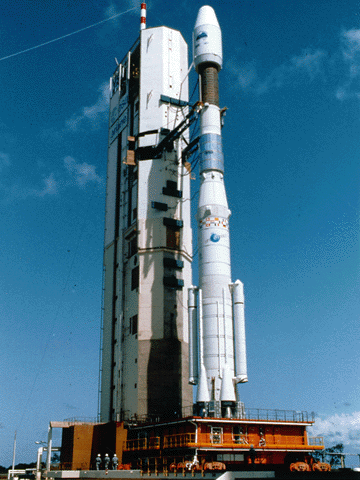
Ariane 4 rocket

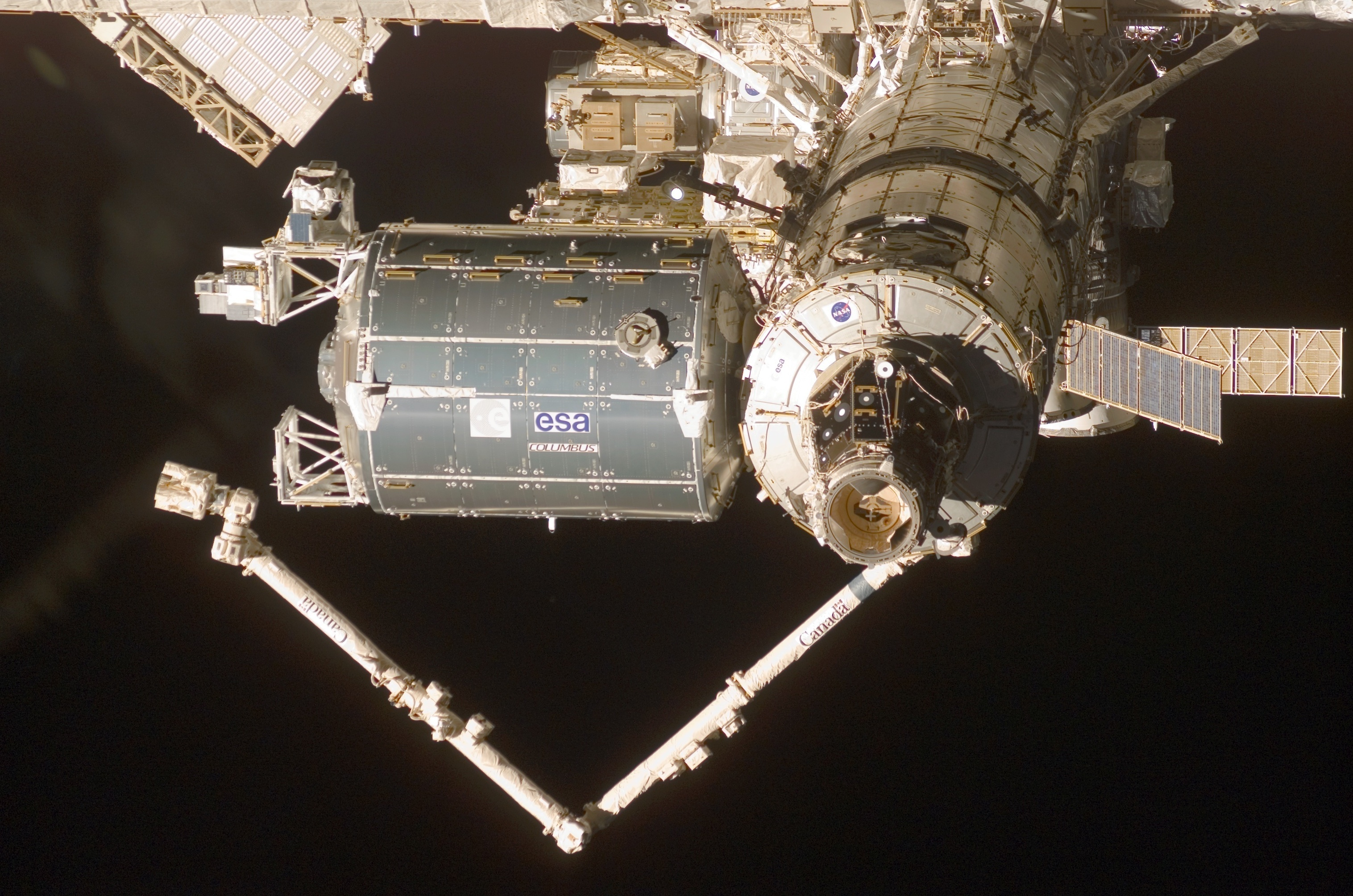
Columbus module at ISS

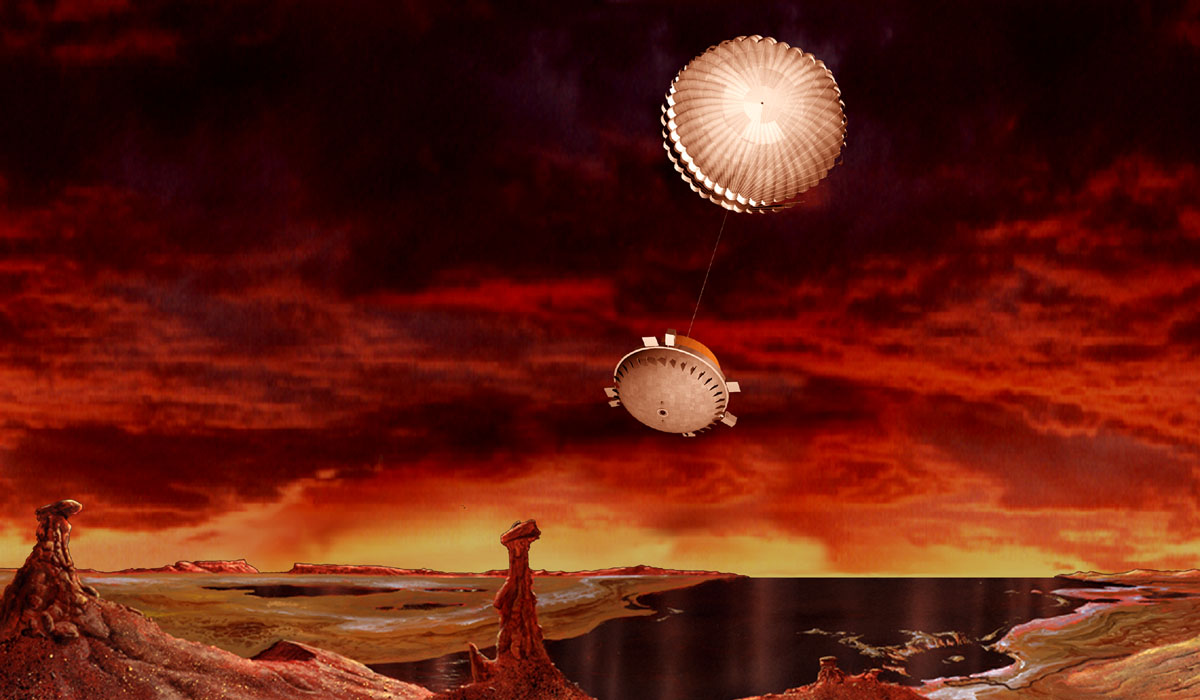
Huygens landing on Titan (artist's impression)

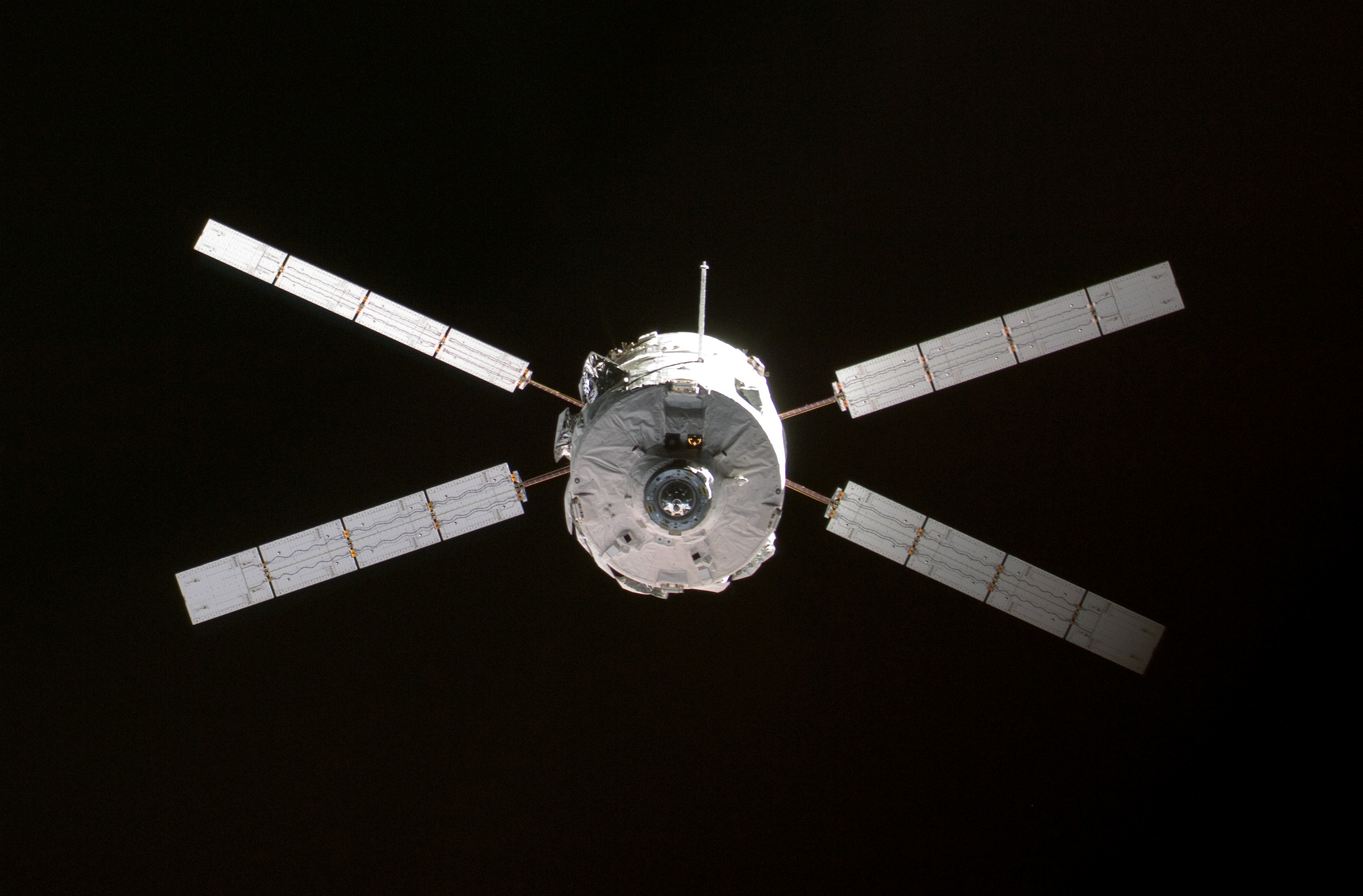
ATV Jules Verne near ISS

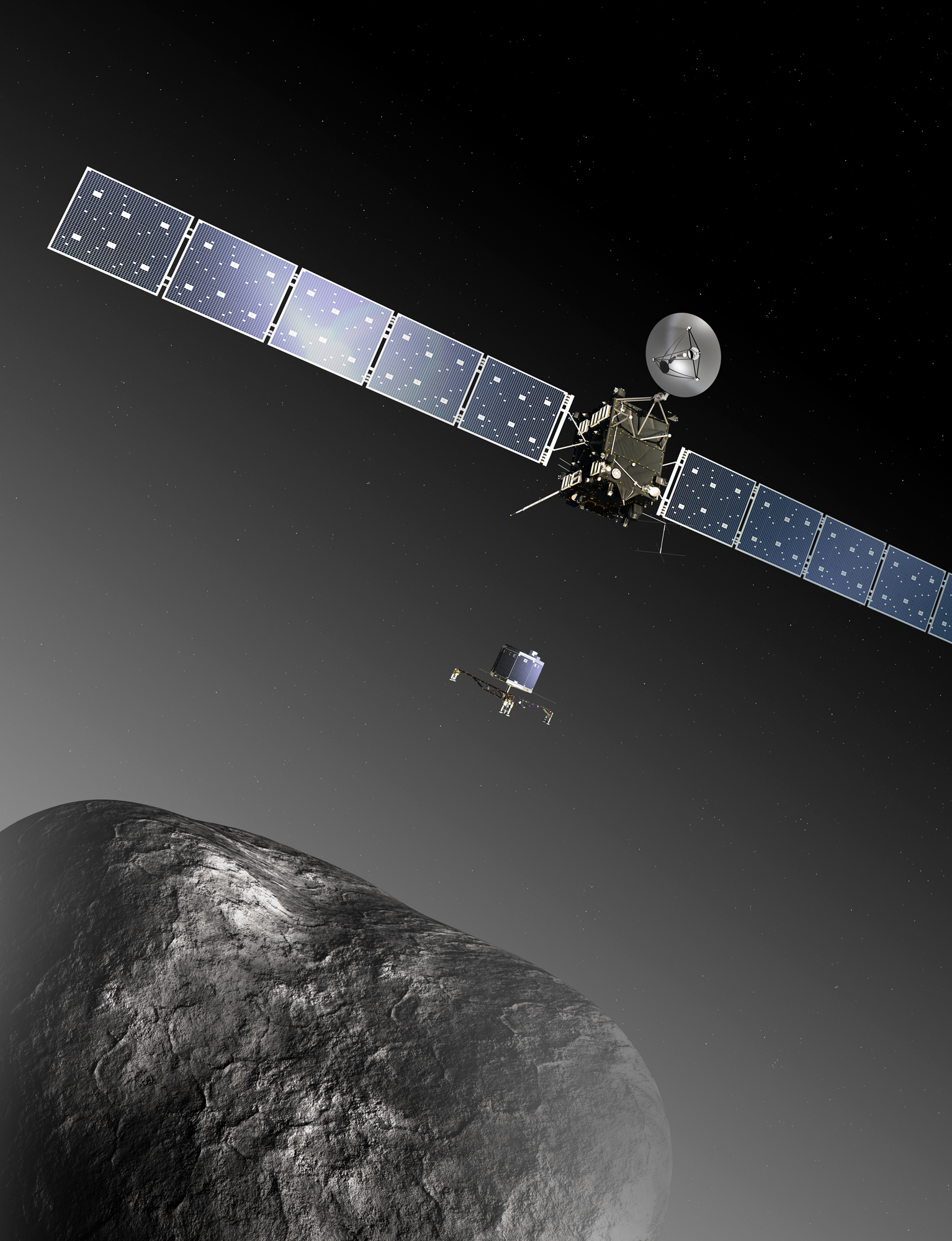
Rosetta and Philae (artist's impression)

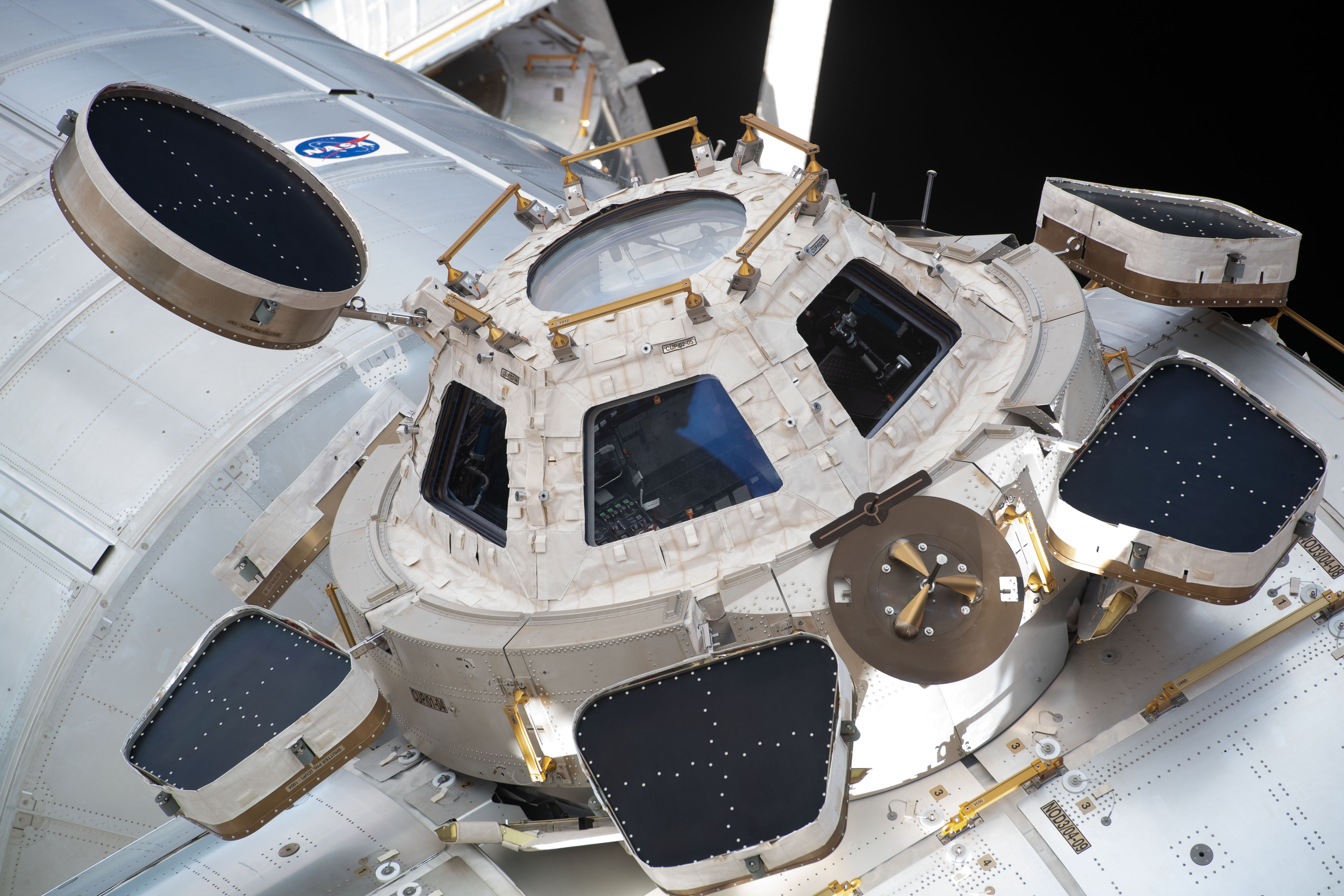
Cupola module at ISS

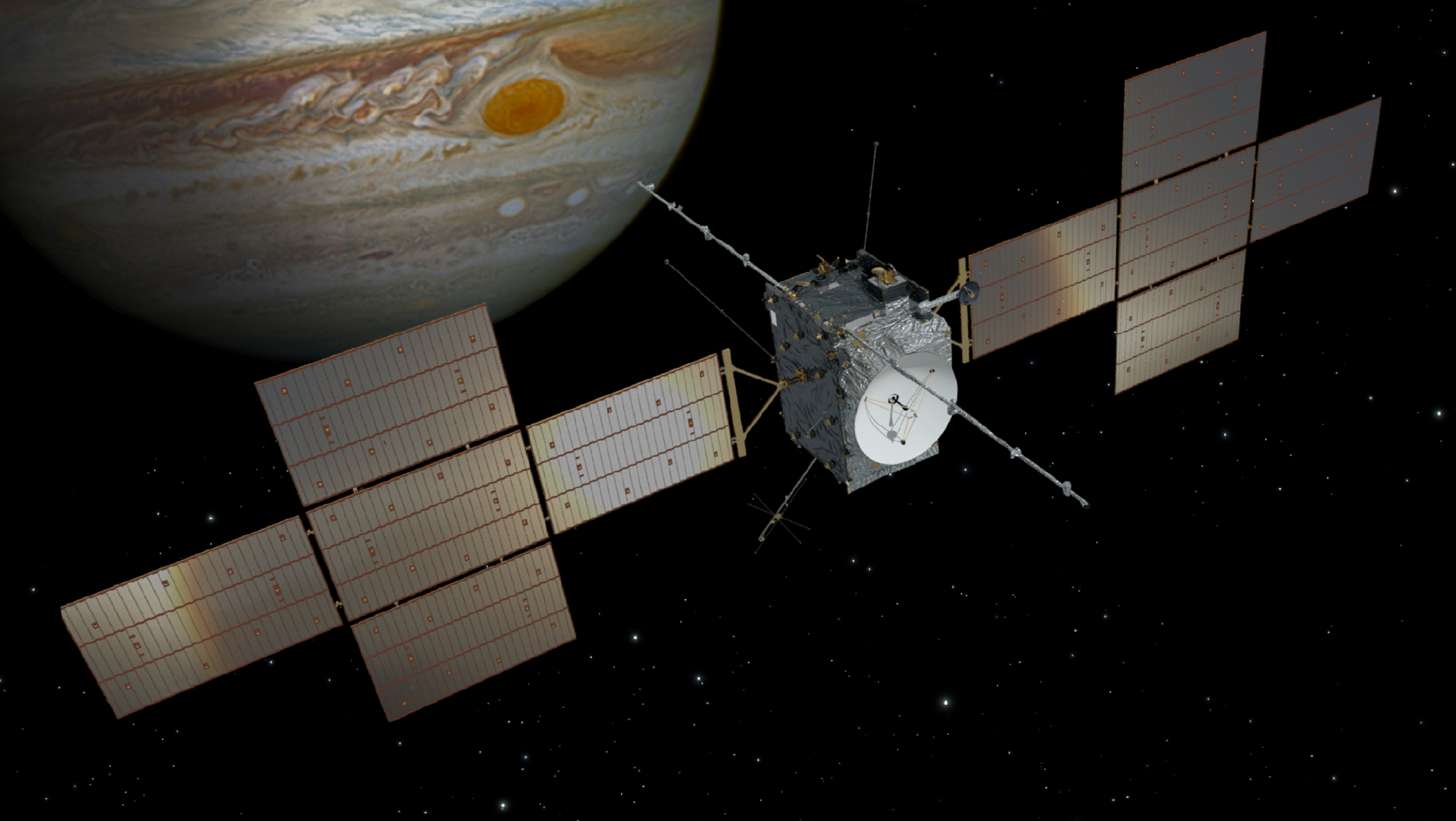
JUICE at Jupiter (artist's impression)

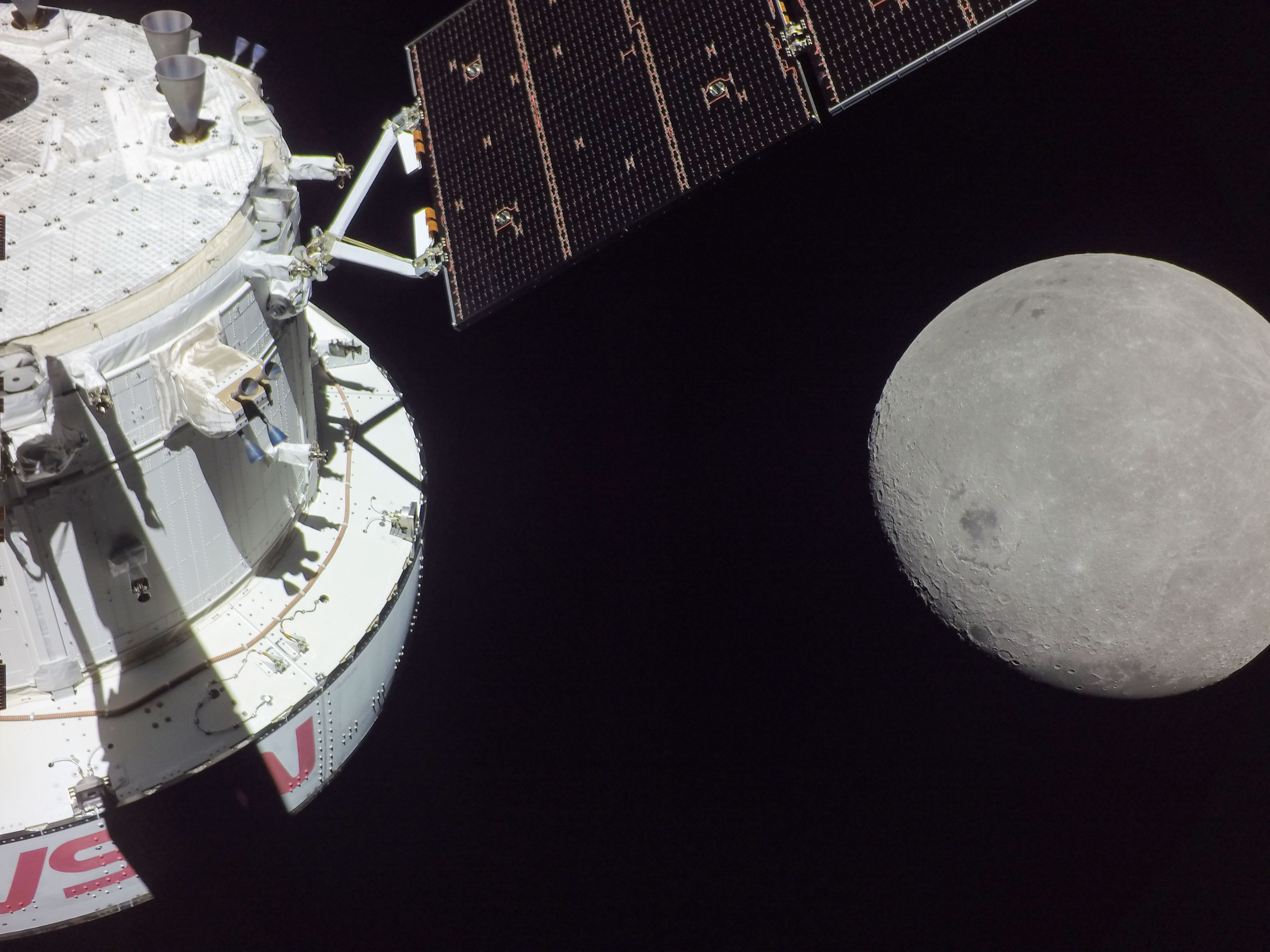
Orion and ESM approach the Moon

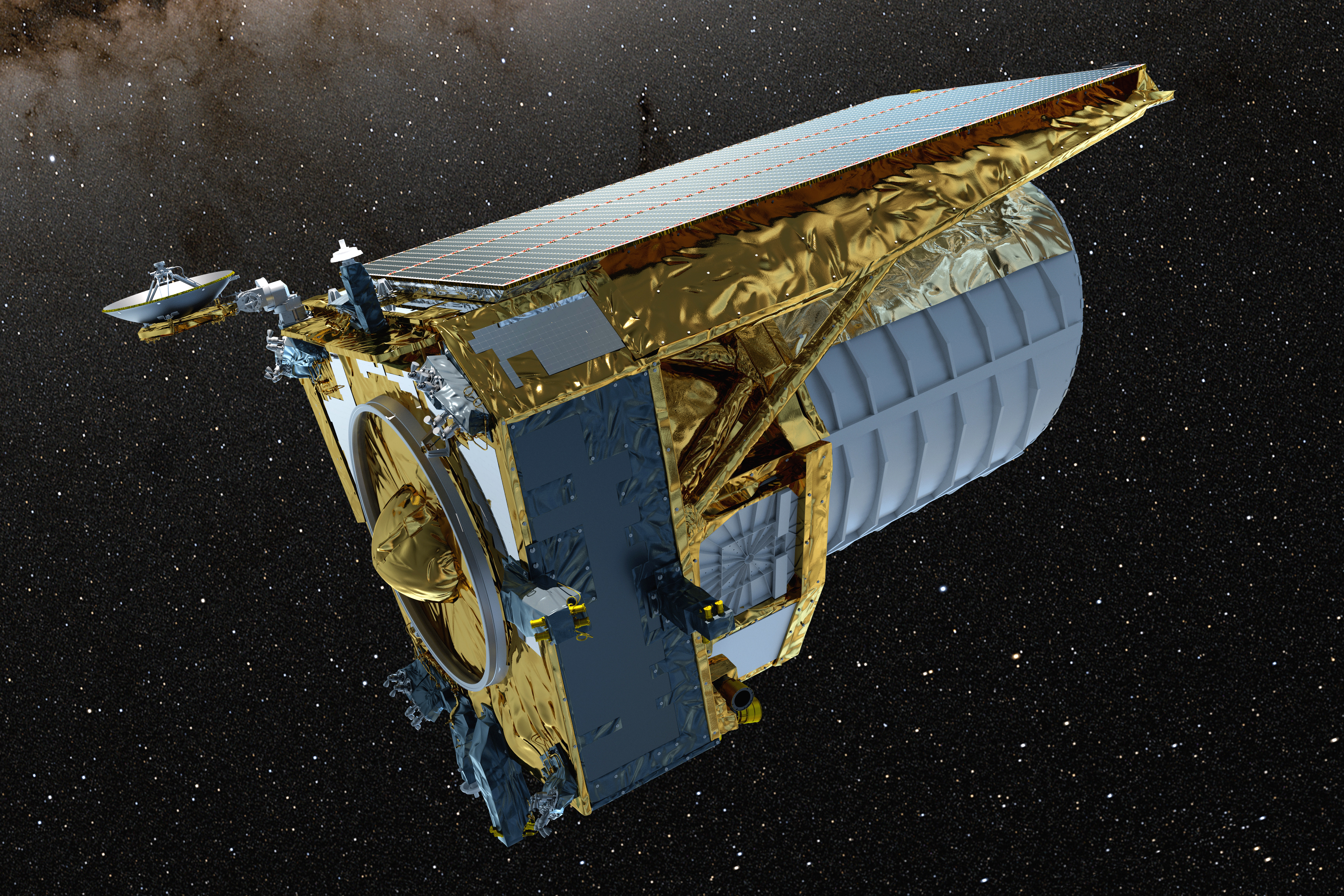
Euclid space telescope (artist's impression)

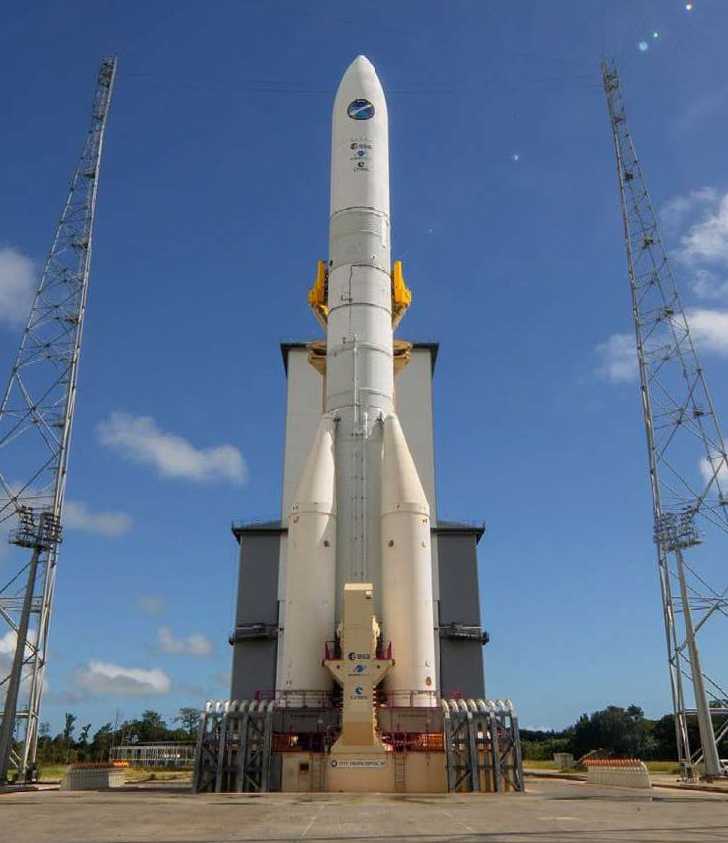
Ariane 6 rocket

After World War II, many European scientists left Western Europe to work with the United States. Although the 1950s boom made it possible for Western European countries to invest in research and specifically in space-related activities, Western European scientists realised solely national projects would not be able to compete with the two superpowers. In 1958, only months after the Sputnik shock, Edoardo Amaldi (Italy) and Pierre Auger (France), two prominent members of the Western European scientific community, met to discuss the foundation of a common Western European space agency. The meeting was attended by scientific representatives from eight countries.

The Western European nations decided to have two agencies: one concerned with developing a launch system, ELDO (European Launcher Development Organisation), of which Renzo Carrobio di Carrobio became the first Secretary General from 1964 to 1971, and the other the precursor of the European Space Agency, ESRO (European Space Research Organisation), led by Pierre Auger. The latter was established on 20 March 1964 by an agreement signed on 14 June 1962. From 1968 to 1972, ESRO launched seven research satellites, but ELDO was not able to deliver a launch vehicle. Both agencies struggled with the underfunding and diverging interests of their participants.

=== Foundation ===
The ESA in its current form was founded with the ESA Convention in 1975, when ESRO was merged with ELDO. ESA had ten founding member states: Belgium, Denmark, France, West Germany, Italy, the Netherlands, Spain, Sweden, Switzerland, and the United Kingdom. These signed the ESA Convention in 1975 and deposited the instruments of ratification by 1980, when the convention came into force. During this interval the agency functioned in a de facto fashion.

=== First science missions ===
ESA launched its first major scientific mission in 1975, Cos-B, a satellite monitoring gamma-ray emissions in the universe, which was first worked on by ESRO. ESA collaborated with NASA on the International Ultraviolet Explorer (IUE), the world's first high-orbit telescope, which was launched in 1978 and operated successfully for 18 years. A number of successful Earth-orbit projects followed, and in 1986 ESA began Giotto, its first deep-space mission, to study the comets Halley and Grigg–Skjellerup. Hipparcos, a star-mapping mission, was launched in 1989 and in the 1990s SOHO, Ulysses, and the Hubble Space Telescope were all jointly carried out with NASA. Later scientific missions in cooperation with NASA include the Cassini–Huygens space probe, to which the ESA contributed by building the Titan landing module Huygens.

=== First launch vehicles ===
As the successor of ELDO, the ESA has also constructed rockets for scientific and commercial payloads. Ariane 1, launched in 1979, carried mostly commercial payloads into orbit from 1984 onward. The next two versions of the Ariane rocket family were intermediate stages in the development of a more advanced launch system, the Ariane 4, which operated between 1988 and 2003 and established the ESA as the world leader in commercial space launches in the 1990s. Although the succeeding Ariane 5 experienced a failure on its first flight in 1996, it has since firmly established itself within the heavily competitive commercial space launch market with 112 successful launches until 2023. In 1998, ESA started developing the small-lift launch vehicle Vega.

=== First astronauts ===
Astronauts from the future ESA member states have been joining Soviet space missions since 1978. The first ESA astronaut to fly to space was Ulf Merbold who joined the STS-9 mission of the American Space Shuttle in 1983, that carried the first European-built Spacelab laboratory module. The experience gained during the Spacelab programme was later instrumental in developing the International Space Station (ISS). Since then, ESA astronauts have been joining Space Shuttle flights, as well as Russian Soyuz flights to the Mir space station. During the 1980s and 1990s, ESA was considering developing its own crewed spacecraft Hermes and a small space station Columbus MTFF. These plans were later abandoned and instead, ESA joined the ISS programme with Columbus being repurposed as one of the station's laboratory modules and ESA astronauts flying to the station on American and Russian spacecraft.

=== ESA in the 2000s ===
The beginning of the new millennium saw the ESA become, along with agencies like NASA and JAXA, one of the major participants in space research. Although ESA had relied on co-operation with NASA in previous decades, changed circumstances, such as tough legal restrictions on information sharing under ITAR, led to decisions to rely more on itself and on cooperation with Roscosmos.

The agency continued its contribution to the International Space Station (ISS) programme with European astronauts joining assembly flights as well as long-term missions to the station. In 2008, ESA added its laboratory module Columbus to ISS and started launching the ATV cargo spacecraft. During the 2000s, ESA was considering cooperation with Russia on the proposed Kliper and CSTS crewed vehicles, but neither of these was developed.

Notable deep space missions during the 2000s included the agency's first Moon, Mars, and Venus orbiters: SMART-1, Mars Express, and Venus Express. ESA's Huygens probe, launched together with the NASA's Cassini mission in 1997, reached its destination in 2005 when it successfully landed on Titan, marking the farthest landing from Earth a spacecraft has ever made. The comet orbiter Rosetta launched in 2004 and performed multiple deep space flybys and observations during the decade, but wouldn't reach its destination until 2014.

ESA has launched multiple major astronomy missions in the 2000s: the gamma ray observatory INTEGRAL, the infrared observatory Herschel, the cosmic microwave background mapper Planck, and Corot, a milestone in the search for exoplanets. Notable Earth observation missions launched during the decade included Envisat, Double Star, GOCE, SMOS, and the experimental PROBA series. ESA also contributed to the meteorological constellations Meteosat and MetOp and tested technologies for the future Galileo satellite navigation system with two GIOVE satellites.

During the 2000s, ESA pursued the Aurora programme which planned to launch a series of increasingly ambitious missions culminating in a crewed landing on Mars. The programme was eventually abandoned with only the ExoMars series of astrobiology space probes to Mars remaining active. ExoMars, as well as the plans for human spaceflight to LEO, the Moon, and Mars, were later incorporated into the new Terrae Novae programme established in 2016.

=== ESA in the 2010s ===
In 2010, ESA added the Cupola observation module to ISS and European astronauts continued joining long-term missions to the station. The ATV cargo spacecraft continued resupplying ISS until its last flight in 2015. In 2012, ESA committed to providing the ATV-derived European Service Module for NASA's crewed lunar spacecraft Orion.

In 2014, ESA's Rosetta probe arrived at its destinatination, the Jupiter-family comet 67P/Churyumov–Gerasimenko. It became the first spacecraft ever to orbit a comet and its lander Philae performed the first ever landing on a comet. In 2016, ESA launched its second Mars orbiter mission, the ExoMars Trace Gas Orbiter (TGO), as the first ExoMars mission within the newly established Terrae Novae programme. When the spacecraft arrived at Mars later the same year, it released the Schiaparelli lander, which failed on landing. TGO, however, entered the Martian orbit and after 11 months of aerobraking began its scientific observations, focused mostly on the atmosphere of Mars. In 2018, ESA and JAXA launched the joint mission BepiColombo, which is expected to arrive at Mercury in 2026.

Notable astronomy missions launched in 2010s were the astrometry telescope Gaia, which produced the largest and most precise 3D catalogue of astronomical objects ever made, and the exoplanets-characterising telescope CHEOPS. ESA also launched LISA Pathfinder, a technology demonstrator for the future gravitational wave observatory LISA. In 2010, ESA launched the cryosphere-monitoring satellite CryoSat-2, a replacement for CryoSat-1 which had been destroyed in 2005 due to a failure of its Russian launch vehicle. Another major Earth observation satellite mission of the decade was the magnetic field-observing Swarm, launched in 2013.

The 2010s saw the first launches of two major European satellite constellations, to which ESA contributed alongside other European institutions, the satellite navigation system Galileo and the Earth observation programme Copernicus with its Sentinel satellites. The first operational pair of Galileo satellites was launched in 2011. The radar satellite Sentinel-1A, first dedicated mission of the Copernicus Programme, was launched in 2014, followed by the optical imaging satellite Sentinel-2A in 2015, the oceanography satellite Sentinel-3A in 2016, and the air pollution-monitoring Sentinel-5p in 2017. Since the 2010s, ESA launched numerous CubeSat-type small satellites supported through various programmes (see List of ESA CubeSats).

The small-lift launch vehicle Vega, developed by the Italian company Avio, had its first flight in 2012 and then flew 22 times until 2024 when it was replaced by the more powerful Vega-C. In 2016, ESA started supporting the Spanish company PLD Space with FLPP funding for the development of their commercial reusable launch vehicle Miura 5.

=== ESA in the 2020s ===
After the 2022 Russian invasion of Ukraine, the cooperation between ESA and Roscosmos was mostly severed. This led to a delay in the ExoMars programme and ending of Soyuz launches from the Guiana Space Centre. Furthermore, the space policy of the second Trump administration brought uncertainty into many joint ESA-NASA programmes including major science missions and human spaceflight. The ministerial council held in November 2025 reacted to the changed international situation by including security and defence in ESA's mandate, funding development of new European launch vehicles, as well as confirming many priorities of the long term, autonomy-focused "Strategy 2040" proposed earlier in 2025 and approving a record budget of €22.1 billion. In early 2026, ESA established the new Resilience, Navigation, and Connectivity Directorate focused on security and defence technologies.

In early 2020s, ESA has added two major components to the ISS. The Bartolomeo platform was connected to the Columbus module in 2020 to increase its capacity for external payloads. The European Robotic Arm was launched in 2021 together with the Nauka module. ESA continued contributing European astronauts to regular ISS expeditions, and also started paying private companies for short-term astronaut flights to the station. ESA also started supporting European companies in developing uncrewed space capsules for resupplying the ISS and future space stations via the LCRS initiative, as well as the Indian ISRO in developing their crewed Gaganyaan spacecraft. The ESA-built European Service Module of the Orion spacecraft flew on its first uncrewed test flight in 2022 and in 2026, it brought Artemis II, the first beyond-low Earth orbit crewed spaceflight since 1972, around the Moon.

The BepiColombo mission, launched in 2018, has completed all its nine gravity assist manoeuvres at Earth, Venus, and Mercury, in preparation for the planned 2026 insertion into Mercury orbit. The heliophysics mission Solar Orbiter, launched in 2020, continues to perform periodic Venus flybys which gradually increase its orbital inclination, allowing it to observe the Sun from outside the Solar system plane. The Juice mission, launched in 2023, has so far completed two gravity assist manoeuvres at Earth and Venus on its way to enter an orbit around Jupiter in 2031. Two European orbiters, Mars Express and TGO, continued their operations around Mars, providing scientific insights into the planet's surface and atmosphere. In 2025, Mars Express received a software update, which could allow it to stay operational until 2030s.

The Hera mission, launched in 2024 as the first space mission of the optional Space Safety Programme, flew by Mars in 2025 on its way to perform a post-impact survey of the asteroid Dimorphos which had been impacted by NASA's Double Asteroid Redirection Test mission. The Space Safety Programme was established in 2019 by substantially expanding the former Space Situational Awareness (SSA) programme. Since then, it prepared an extensive series of space missions and ground-based projects focused on mitigating the dangers of near-Earth asteroids, space weather, and space debris, which was fully endorsed by ESA member states.

The long-awaited NASA-ESA-CSA space telescope, the James Webb Space Telescope, finally launched in 2021 and started operating in its halo orbit around the Sun–Earth L_{2} point in 2022. The first half of 2023 saw the launch the Euclid space telescope designed to better understand dark energy and dark matter by accurately measuring the accelerating expansion of the universe. The experimental PROBA-3 mission, launched in 2024, successfully demonstrated high-precision formation flying for coronagraphy observation of the Sun. The space weather mission SMILE, developed in cooperation with CAS, was launched in May 2026.

The successor to the Vega launch vehicle, Vega C, launched successfully for the first time in July 2022, delivering the LARES 2 satellite and six CubeSats to Earth orbit. The successor to the Ariane 5 launch vehicle, Ariane 6, had its maiden flight in July 2024, followed by the first commercial launch in March 2025 and the first launch of the 4-booster variant Ariane 64 in February 2026. In the 2020s, ESA started supporting aspiring European commercial launch providers with substantial development funding and launch contracts through the Boost! programme, the Flight Ticket Initiative, and the European Launcher Challenge (ELC). This resulted in the first successful orbital launch from Western European soil performed on 5 September 2026 by Isar Aerospace's Spectrum rocket from Andøya Spaceport.

== Facilities ==
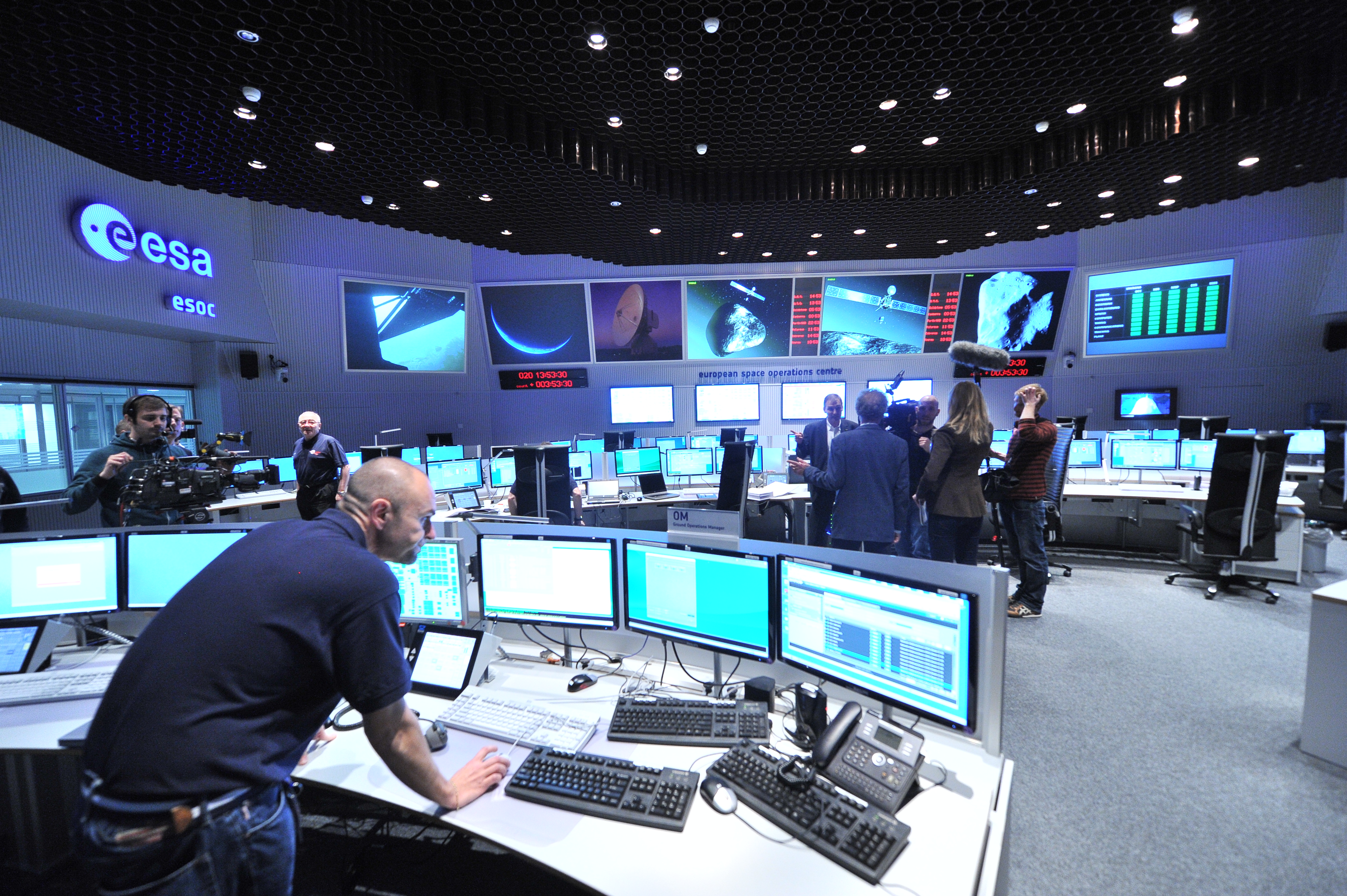
European Space Operations Centre in Darmstadt, Germany.

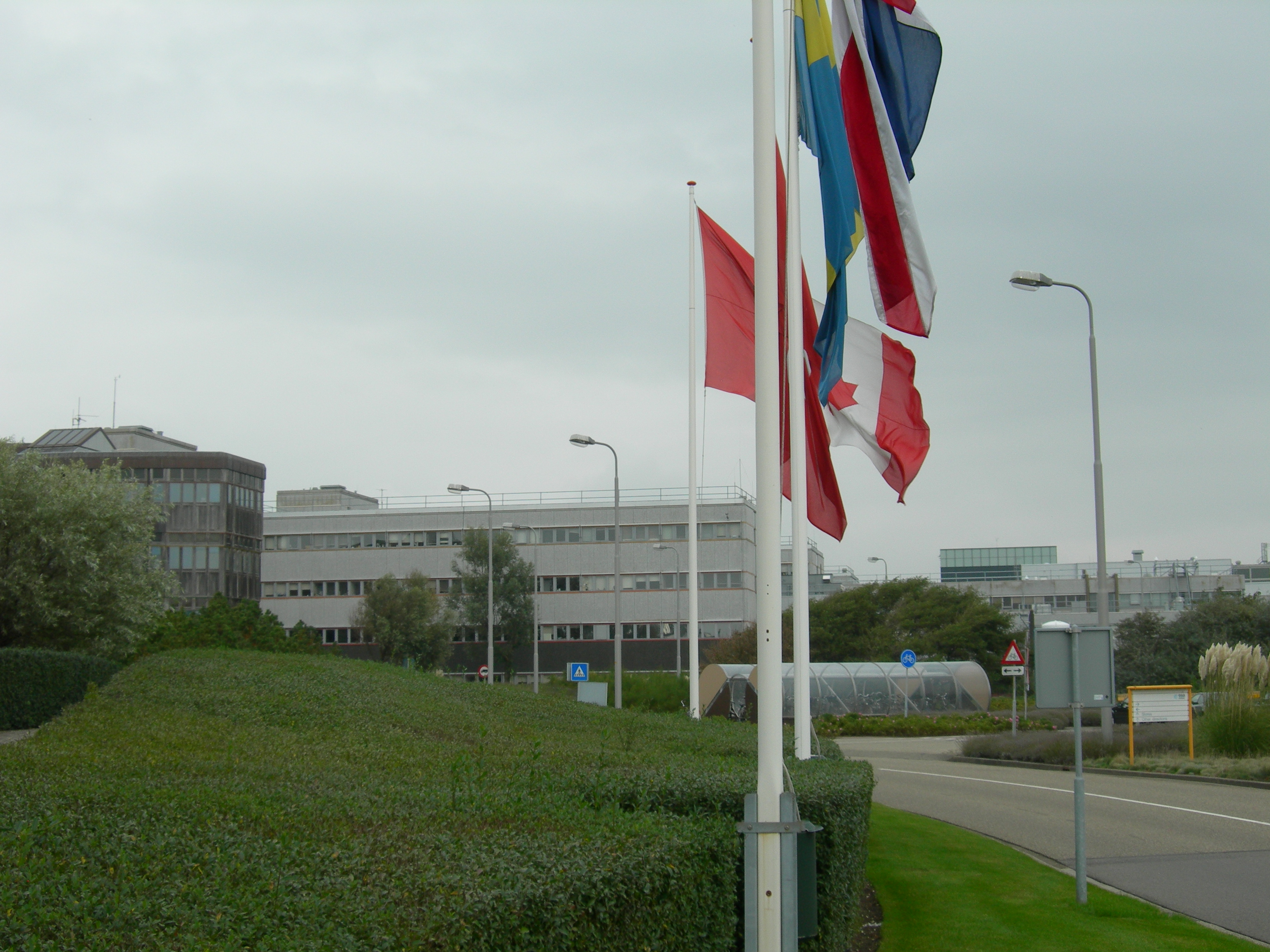
ESTEC buildings in Noordwijk, Netherlands.

The agency's facilities date back to ESRO and are deliberately distributed among various countries and areas. The most important are the following centres:

- ESA headquarters in Paris, France;
- ESA science missions are based at ESTEC in Noordwijk, Netherlands;
- Earth Observation missions at the ESA Centre for Earth Observation in Frascati, Italy;
- ESA Mission Control (ESOC) is in Darmstadt, Germany;
- The European Astronaut Centre (EAC) that trains astronauts for future missions is situated in Cologne, Germany;
- The European Centre for Space Applications and Telecommunications (ECSAT), a research institute created in 2009, is located in Harwell, England, United Kingdom;
- The European Space Astronomy Centre (ESAC) is located in Villanueva de la Cañada, Madrid, Spain.
- The European Space Security and Education Centre (ESEC), located in Redu, Belgium;
- The ESTRACK tracking and deep space communication network.
- Many other facilities are operated by national space agencies in close collaboration with ESA.
  - Esrange near Kiruna in Sweden;
  - Guiana Space Centre in Kourou, France;
  - Toulouse Space Centre, France;
  - Institute of Space Propulsion in Lampoldshausen, Germany;
  - Columbus Control Centre in Oberpfaffenhofen, Germany.

== Programmes ==
=== Mandatory programmes ===
Every member state must contribute to the mandatory programmes. The contributions to the mandatory programmes are calculated based on the states' Gross National Product. Decisions about these programmes are taken unanimously.

- European Space Agency Science Programme
  - Horizon 2000
  - Horizon 2000 Plus
  - Cosmic Vision
  - Voyage 2050
- Technology Development Element Programme
- Science Core Technology Programme

=== Optional programmes ===
Depending on their individual choices, the member states can contribute to optional programmes.

- Launchers
  - Ariane rocket family
  - Vega, Vega-C
  - Future Launchers Preparatory Programme
- Earth Observation
  - FutureEO (formerly Living Planet Programme)
  - Copernicus
  - MetOp-SG
- Human Spaceflight and Exploration
  - Aurora
  - Terrae Novae (formerly European Exploration Envelope Programme, E3P)
- Telecommunications (managed by ESA Connectivity and Secure Communications directorate)
  - Advanced Research in Telecommunication Systems (ARTES)
  - IRIS^{2}
  - HydRON
  - Moonlight Programme
- Navigation
  - EGNOS
  - Galileo
- Space Safety Programme (formerly Space Situational Awareness)
- Technology
  - General Support Technology Programme (GSTP)

== Member states, funding, and budget ==
ESA member states
ESA associate states (Cyprus, Latvia, Lithuania, Slovakia) and ESA cooperating state (Canada)
ESA ECS states (Bulgaria, Croatia, Malta)
ESA Cooperation Agreement states

=== Membership and contribution to the ESA ===
Member states participate to varying degrees with both mandatory space programmes and those that are optional. As of 2008, the mandatory programmes made up 25% of total expenditures while optional space programmes were the other 75%. The ESA has traditionally implemented a policy of "georeturn", where funds that ESA member states provide to the ESA "are returned in the form of contracts to companies in those countries."

By 2015, the ESA was an intergovernmental organisation of 22 member states. The 2008 ESA budget amounted to €3.0 billion whilst the 2009 budget amounted to €3.6 billion. The total budget amounted to about €3.7 billion in 2010, €3.99 billion in 2011, €4.02 billion in 2012, €4.28 billion in 2013, €4.10 billion in 2014, €4.43 billion in 2015, €5.25 billion in 2016, €5.75 billion in 2017, €5.60 billion in 2018, €5.72 billion in 2019, €6.68 billion in 2020, €6.49 billion in 2021, €7.15 billion in 2022, €7.46 billion in 2023, €7.79 billion in 2024 and €8.26 billion in 2026

English and French are the two official languages of the ESA. Additionally, official documents are also provided in German and documents regarding the Spacelab have been also provided in Italian. If found appropriate, the agency may conduct its correspondence in any language of a member state.

The following table lists all the member states and adjunct members, their ESA convention ratification dates, and their contributions as of 2026:

Member state or partner	Ratification of ESA convention or association agreement	National programme	Contributions		
Member state or partner	Ratification of ESA convention or association agreement	National programme	M€	% of total	Per capita (€)
Full member states
(European Union) Austria (Note: These nations are considered initial signatories, but since they were members of neither ESRO nor ELDO (the precursor organisations to ESA) the Convention could only enter into force when the last of the other 10 founders ratified it.)	30 December 1986	ALR	80.1	1.4%	8.80
(European Union) Belgium (Note: Founding members and initial signatories drafted the ESA charter which entered into force on 30 October 1980. These nations were also members of either ELDO or ESRO.)	3 October 1978	BELSPO	235.8	4.2%	20.03
(European Union) Czechia	12 August 2008	Ministry of Transport	53.2	1.0%	5.05
(European Union) Denmark	15 September 1977	UFM	63.2	1.1%	10.49
(European Union) Estonia	1 September 2015	ESO	10.0	0.2%	7.51
(European Union) Finland	1 January 1995	TEM	41.4	0.7%	7.36
(European Union) France	30 October 1980	CNES	990.7	17.8%	14.84
(European Union) Germany	26 July 1977	DLR	1,346.1	24.2%	16.09
(European Union) Greece	9 March 2005	HSC	27.4	0.5%	2.77
(European Union) Hungary	4 November 2015	HSO	22.0	0.4%	2.30
(European Union) Ireland	10 December 1980	Enterprise Ireland	34.2	0.6%	6.38
(European Union) Italy	20 February 1978	ASI	809.8	14.6%	13.74
(European Union) Luxembourg	30 June 2005	LSA	62.0	1.1%	90.19
(European Union) Netherlands	6 February 1979	NLSA	121.7	2.2%	6.60
(European Free Trade Association) Norway	30 December 1986	NSA	82.8	1.5%	14.65
(European Union) Poland	19 November 2012	POLSA	150.0	2.7%	3.96
(European Union) Portugal	14 November 2000	PT Space	30.0	0.5%	2.89
(European Union) Romania	22 December 2011	ROSA	48.0	0.9%	2.55
(European Union) Slovenia	1 January 2025	Slovenian Space Office	12.0	0.2%	5.67
(European Union) Spain	7 February 1979	AEE	292.3	5.3%	6.11
(European Union) Sweden	6 April 1976	SNSA	80.0	1.4%	7.48
(European Free Trade Association) Switzerland	19 November 1976	SSO	203.1	3.7%	22.55
United Kingdom	28 March 1978	UKSA	480.0	8.6%	6.86
Others	—N/a	—N/a	258.5	3.1%	—N/a
Non-full members
Canada (Note: Canada is a Cooperating State of ESA.)	1 January 1979 (Note: Date of ratification of association agreement.)	CSA	13.1	0.2%	0.32
(European Union) Cyprus	19 March 2026	MoCW			
(European Union) Latvia	27 July 2020	LSO	4.1	0.1%	2.23
(European Union) Lithuania	21 May 2021	LSA	3.1	0.1%	1.11
(European Union) Slovakia	13 October 2022	SSO	4.5	0.1%	0.83
Members and associates total			5,300.6	64.2%	
ESA programmes and activities total			5,559.1	67.3%	
European Union (Note: Framework Agreement establishing the legal basis for cooperation between ESA and the European Union came into force in May 2004.)	28 May 2004	EUSPA	1,932.8	23.4%	4.06
EUMETSAT	—N/a	—N/a	115.6	1.4%	—N/a
Other income	—N/a	—N/a	652.5	7.9%	—N/a
Other institutional partners and income total			2,700.9	32.7%	
Grand total			8,260.0	100.0%	

=== Non-full member states ===
Previously associated members were Austria, Norway, Finland and Slovenia, all of which later joined the ESA as full members. Since March 2026 there have been five associate members: Latvia, Lithuania, Slovakia, Cyprus and Canada. The four European members have shown interest in full membership and may eventually apply within the next years.

==== Latvia ====
Latvia became the second current associated member on 30 June 2020, when the Association Agreement was signed by ESA Director Jan Wörner and the Minister of Education and Science of Latvia, Ilga Šuplinska in Riga. The Saeima ratified it on 27 July.

==== Lithuania ====
In May 2021, Lithuania became the third current associated member. As a consequence its citizens became eligible to apply to the 2022 ESA Astronaut group, applications for which were scheduled to close one week later. The deadline was therefore extended by three weeks to allow Lithuanians a fair chance to apply.

==== Slovakia ====
Slovakia's Associate membership came into effect on 13 October 2022, for an initial duration of seven years. The Association Agreement supersedes the European Cooperating State (ECS) Agreement, which entered into force upon Slovakia's subscription to the Plan for European Cooperating States Charter on 4 February 2016, a scheme introduced at ESA in 2001. The ECS Agreement was subsequently extended until 3 August 2022.

==== Cyprus ====
Cyprus has signed an Associate Agreement in October 2025, with expectations of becoming an associate member by early 2026. On 19 March 2026 Cyprus officially became an Associate member of ESA.

==== Canada ====
Since 1 January 1979, Canada has had the special status of a Cooperating State within the ESA. By virtue of this accord, the Canadian Space Agency takes part in the ESA's deliberative bodies and decision-making and also in the ESA's programmes and activities. Canadian firms can bid for and receive contracts to work on programmes. The accord has a provision ensuring a fair industrial return to Canada. The most recent Cooperation Agreement was signed on 12 February 2019 with a term extending to 2030.

For 2014, Canada's annual assessed contribution to the ESA general budget was €6,059,449 (CAD$8,559,050). This annual contribution increased in 2017 to €21,600,000 (CAD$30,000,000). In 2025, the Government of Canada announced a plan to increase contributions to the ESA by €326,000,000 (CAD$528,500,000) over the following three to five-year period.

On 14 April 2026 ESA and Canada signed a General Security of Information Agreement (GSOIA), which establishes a legal framework for the exchange of classified information. This was intended to facilitate collaboration in strategic domains such as surveillance, disaster response, and security and to support the development of dual-use technologies.

=== Budget appropriation and allocation ===
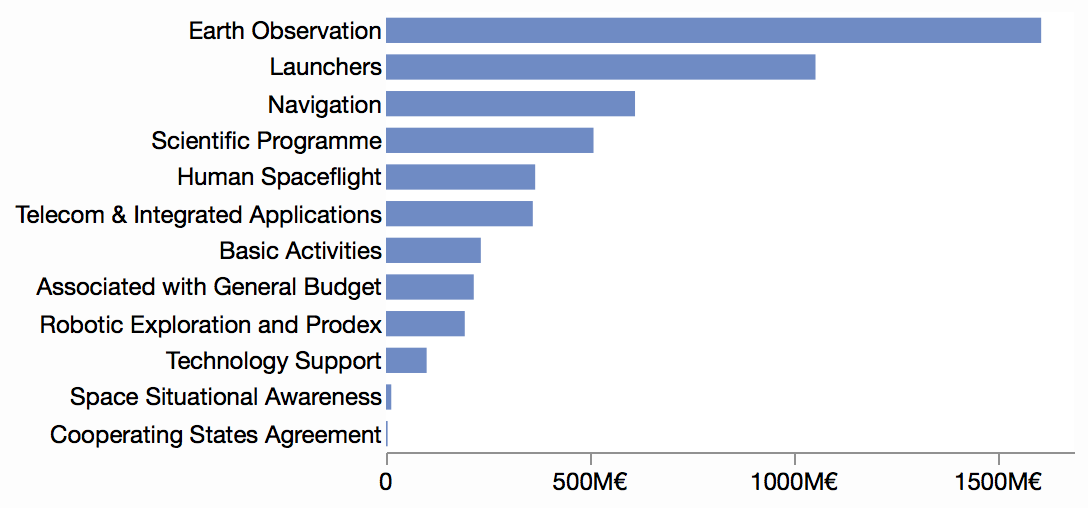
European Space Agency 2016 budget by domain out of a total budget is 5250M€.

The ESA is funded from annual contributions by national governments of members as well as from an annual contribution by the European Union (EU).

The budget of the ESA was €5.250 billion in 2016. Every 3–4 years, ESA member states agree on a budget plan for several years at an ESA member states conference. This plan can be amended in future years, however provides the major guideline for the ESA for several years. The 2016 budget allocations for major areas of the ESA activity are shown in the chart on the right.

Countries typically have their own space programmes that differ in how they operate organisationally and financially with the ESA. For example, the French space agency CNES has a total budget of €2,015 million, of which €755 million is paid as direct financial contribution to the ESA. Several space-related projects are joint projects between national space agencies and the ESA (e.g. COROT). Also, the ESA is not the only European governmental space organisation (for example European Union Satellite Centre and the European Union Space Programme Agency).

=== Enlargement ===
After the decision of the ESA Council of 21/22 March 2001, the procedure for accession of the European states was detailed as described the document titled "The Plan for European Co-operating States (PECS)". Nations that want to become a full member of the ESA do so in 3 stages. First a Cooperation Agreement is signed between the country and ESA. In this stage, the country has very limited financial responsibilities. If a country wants to co-operate more fully with ESA, it signs a European Cooperating State (ECS) Agreement, albeit to be a candidate for said agreement, a country must be European. The ECS Agreement makes companies based in the country eligible for participation in ESA procurements. The country can also participate in all ESA programmes, except for the Basic Technology Research Programme. While the financial contribution of the country concerned increases, it is still much lower than that of a full member state. The agreement is normally followed by a Plan For European Cooperating State (or PECS Charter). This is a 5-year programme of basic research and development activities aimed at improving the nation's space industry capacity. At the end of the 5-year period, the country can either begin negotiations to become a full member state or an associated state or sign a new PECS Charter. Many countries, most of which joined the EU in both 2004 and 2007, have started to co-operate with the ESA on various levels:

Applicant state	Cooperation agreement	ECS agreement	PECS charter	Association agreement signature	Associate membership	National programme
(European Union) Cyprus	27 August 2009	6 July 2016	24 April 2017	23 October 2025	19 March 2026	through MTCW
(European Union) Latvia	23 July 2009	19 March 2013	30 January 2015	30 June 2020	27 July 2020	LSO
(European Union) Lithuania	7 October 2010	7 October 2014	28 September 2015	28 April 2021	21 May 2021	LSA
(European Union) Slovakia	28 April 2010	16 February 2015	4 February 2016	14 June 2022	13 October 2022	SSO
(European Union) Bulgaria	11 June 2014	8 April 2015	4 February 2016	—N/a	—N/a	SRTI
(European Union) Croatia	19 February 2018	23 March 2023	16 August 2023	—N/a	—N/a	through MoSEY
(European Union) Malta	20 February 2012	25 October 2023	12 September 2024	—N/a	—N/a	MCST
Turkey	15 July 2004	—N/a	—N/a	—N/a	—N/a	TUA (agreement with TÜBİTAK UZAY)
Ukraine	25 January 2008	—N/a	—N/a	—N/a	—N/a	SSAU
Israel	30 January 2011	—N/a	—N/a	—N/a	—N/a	ISA
Mexico	14 February 2023	—N/a	—N/a	—N/a	—N/a	AEM

During the Ministerial Meeting in December 2014, ESA ministers approved a resolution calling for discussions to begin with Israel, Australia and South Africa on future association agreements. The ministers noted that "concrete cooperation is at an advanced stage" with these nations and that "prospects for mutual benefits are existing".

A separate space exploration strategy resolution calls for further co-operation with the United States, Russia and China on "LEO exploration, including a continuation of ISS cooperation and the development of a robust plan for the coordinated use of space transportation vehicles and systems for exploration purposes, participation in robotic missions for the exploration of the Moon, the robotic exploration of Mars, leading to a broad Mars Sample Return mission in which Europe should be involved as a full partner, and human missions beyond LEO in the longer term."

In August 2019, the ESA and the Australian Space Agency signed a joint statement of intent "to explore deeper cooperation and identify projects in a range of areas including deep space, communications, navigation, remote asset management, data analytics and mission support". Details of the cooperation were laid out in a framework agreement signed by the two entities.

On 17 November 2020, ESA signed a memorandum of understanding (MOU) with the South African National Space Agency (SANSA). SANSA CEO Dr. Valanathan Munsami tweeted: "Today saw another landmark event for SANSA with the signing of an MoU with the ESA. This builds on initiatives that we have been discussing for a while already and which gives effect to these. Thanks Jan for your hand of friendship and making this possible."

== Launch vehicles ==
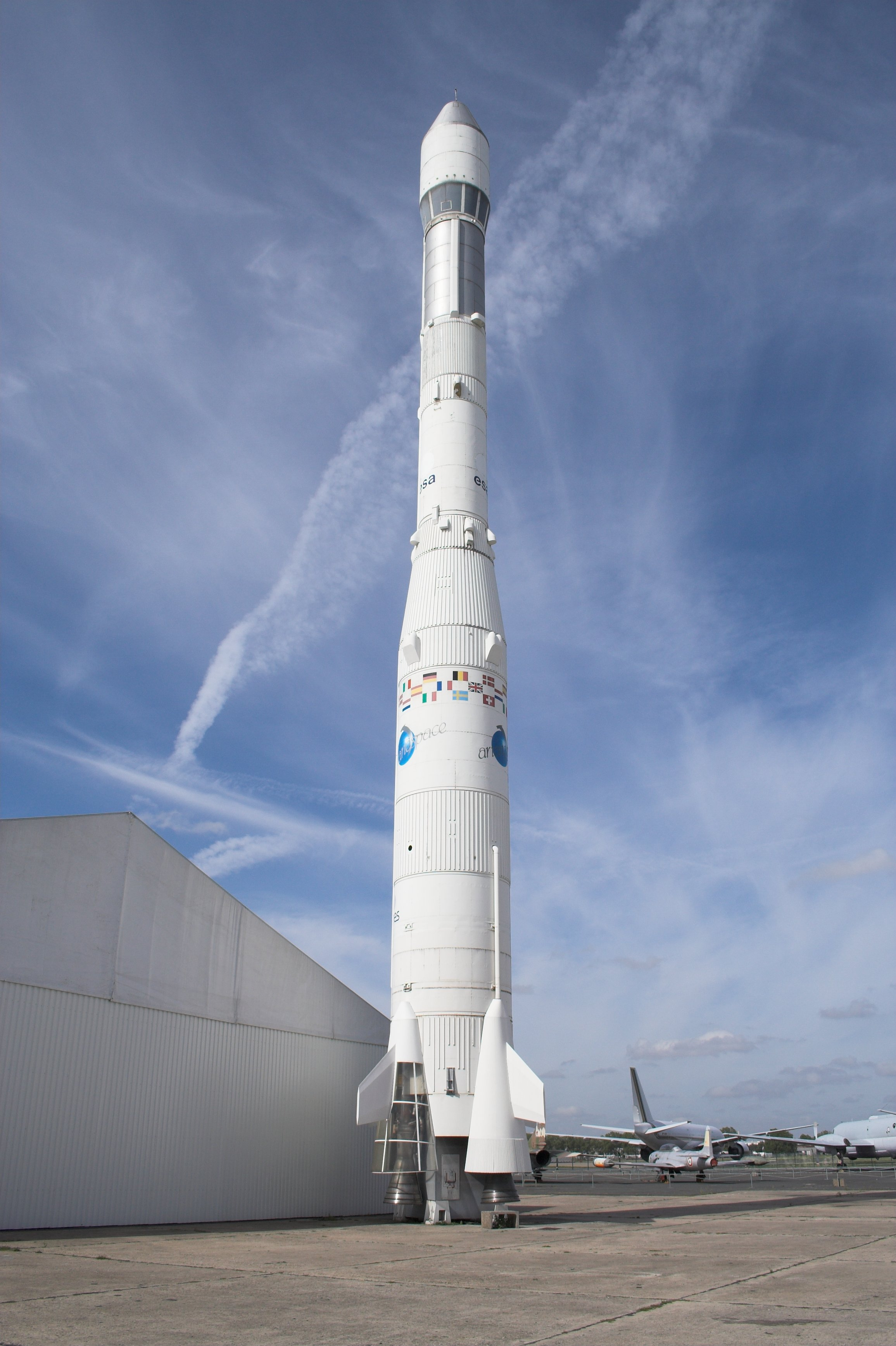
Mock-up of the Ariane 1

The ESA currently has two operational launch vehicles Vega C and Ariane 6. Rocket launches are carried out by Arianespace, which has 23 shareholders representing the industry that manufactures the Ariane 5 as well as CNES, at the ESA's Guiana Space Centre. Because many communication satellites have equatorial orbits, launches from French Guiana are able to take larger payloads into space than from spaceports at higher latitudes. In addition, equatorial launches give spacecraft an extra 'push' of nearly 500 m/s due to the higher rotational velocity of the Earth at the equator compared to near the Earth's poles where rotational velocity approaches zero. In 2014, ESA proposed changes to the Ariane family development scheme by moving to competitive bids for the development of Ariane 6.

=== Ariane 6 ===
Ariane 6 is a heavy lift expendable launch vehicle developed by Arianespace. The Ariane 6 entered into its inaugural flight campaign on 26 April 2024 with the flight conducted on 9 July 2024.

=== Vega-C ===
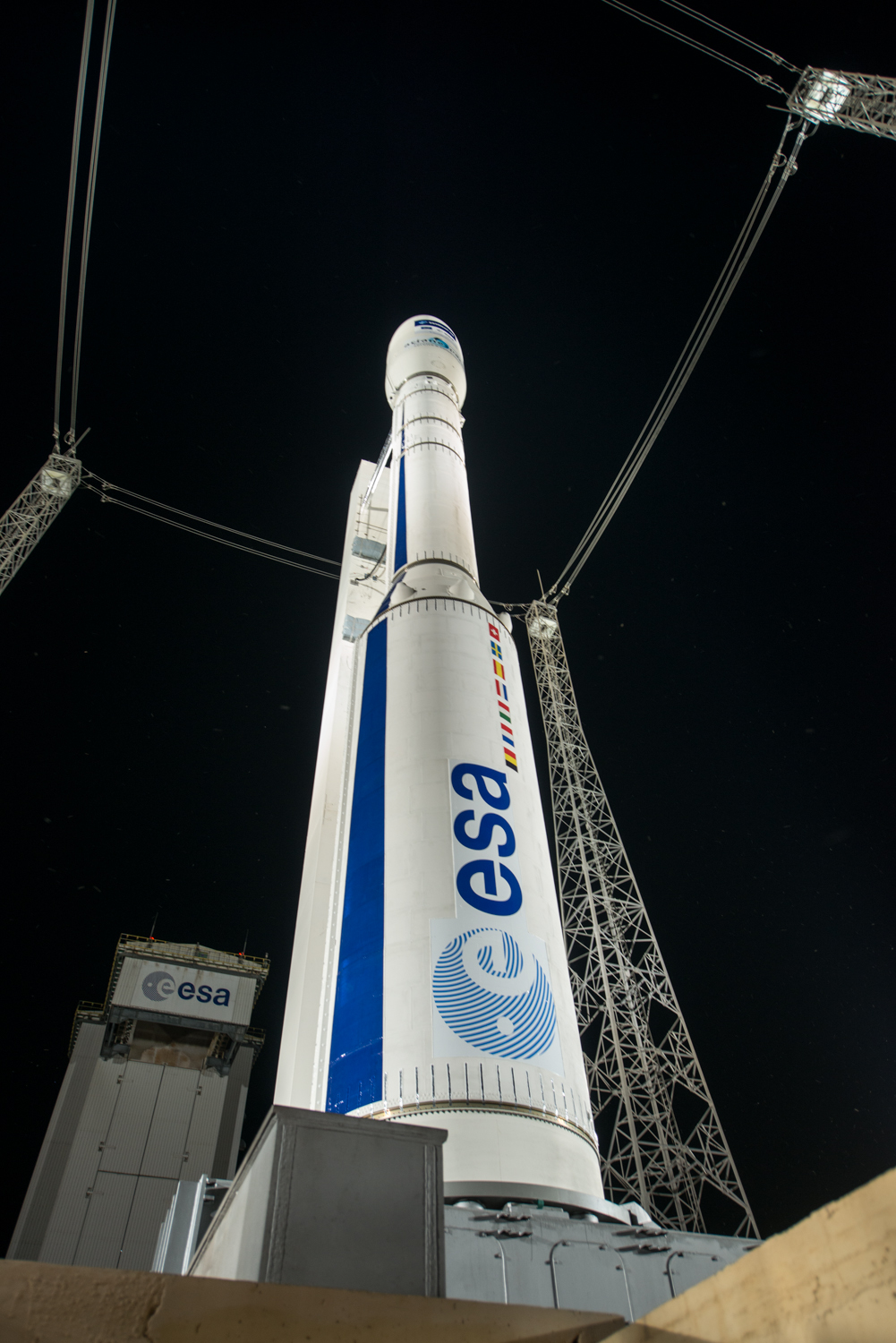
Vega rocket

Vega is the ESA's carrier for small satellites. Developed by seven ESA members led by Italy. It is capable of carrying a payload with a mass of between 300 and 1500 kg to an altitude of 700 km, for low polar orbit. Its maiden launch from Kourou was on 13 February 2012. Vega began full commercial exploitation in December 2015.

The rocket has three solid propulsion stages and a liquid propulsion upper stage (the AVUM) for accurate orbital insertion and the ability to place multiple payloads into different orbits.

A larger version of the Vega launcher, Vega-C had its first flight in July 2022. The new evolution of the rocket incorporates a larger first stage booster, the P120C replacing the P80, an upgraded Zefiro second stage, and the AVUM+ upper stage. This new variant enables larger single payloads, dual payloads, return missions, and orbital transfer capabilities.

=== Future rocket development ===
Future projects under development within the Future Launchers Preparatory Programme (FLPP) include the Prometheus reusable engine technology demonstrator, Phoebus (an upgraded second stage for Ariane 6), and Themis (a reusable first stage).

== Human spaceflight ==
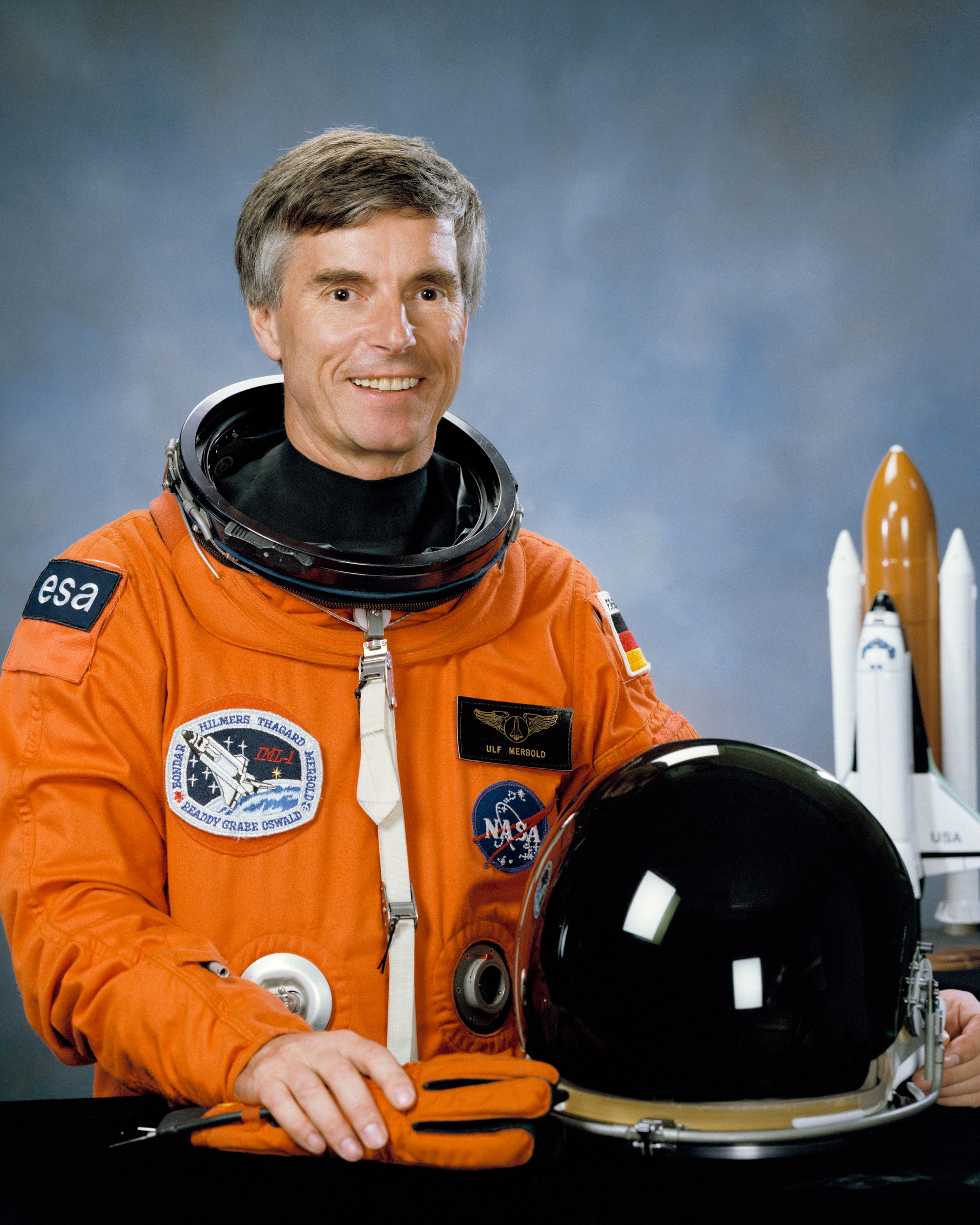
Ulf Merbold became the first ESA astronaut to fly into space.

=== Formation and development ===
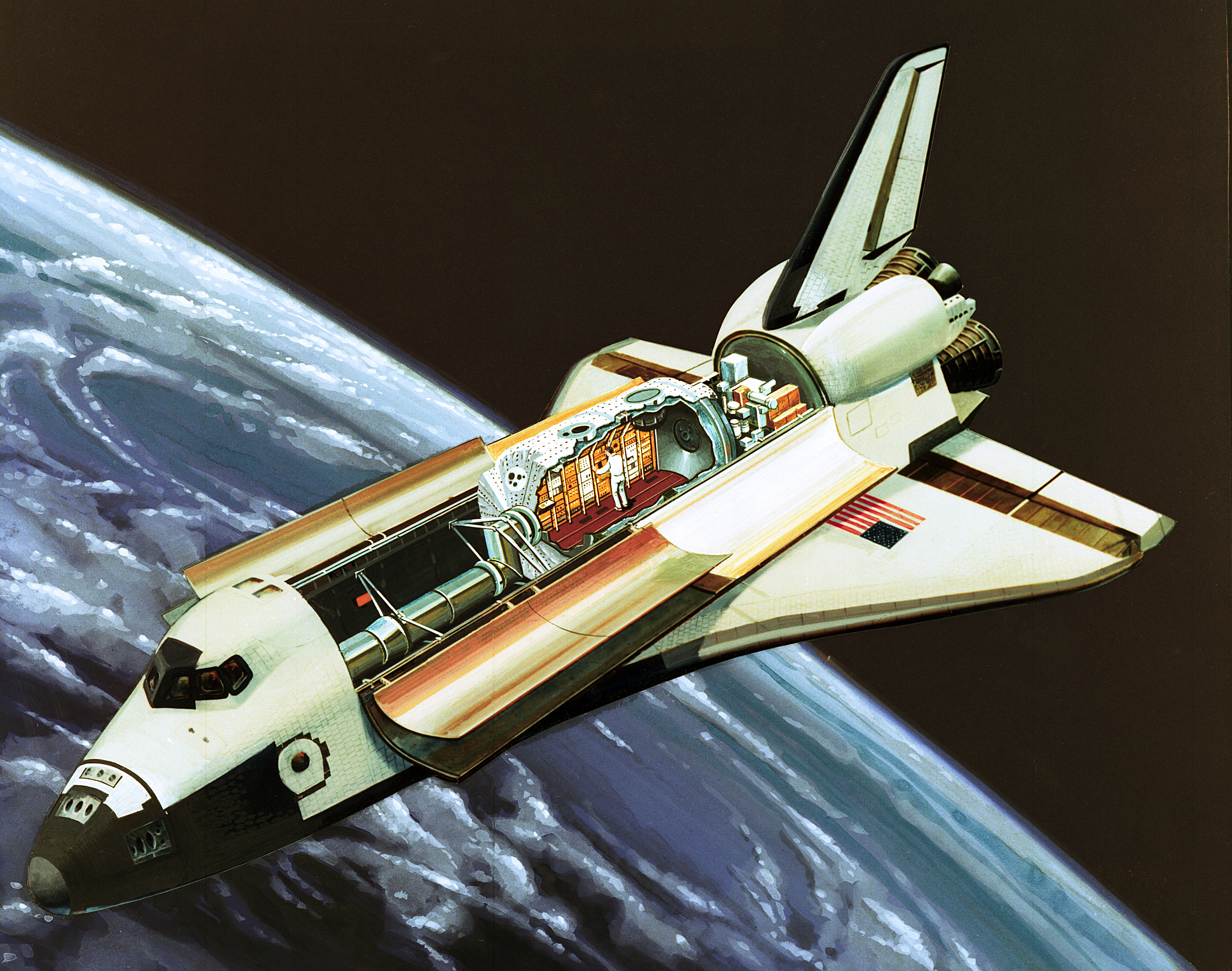
Spacelab, artist's concept

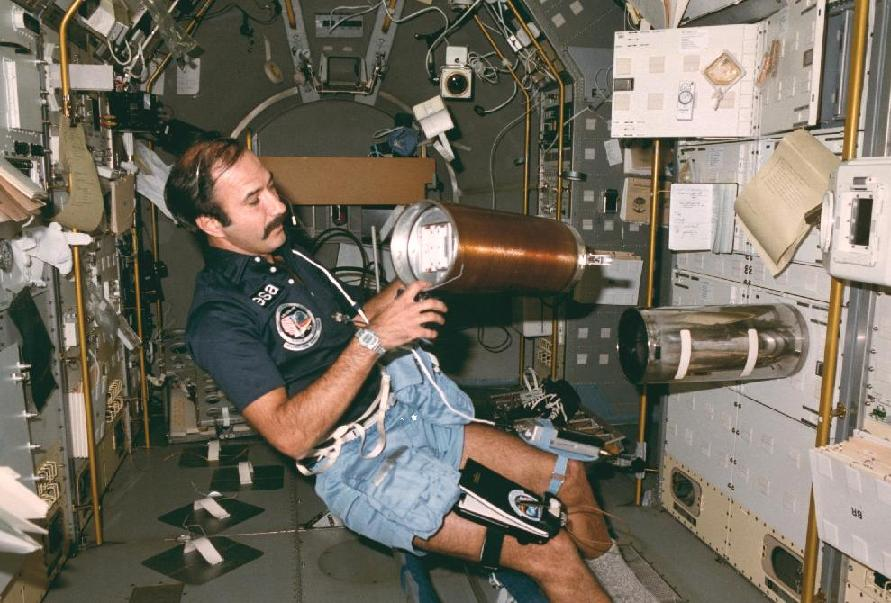
Wubbo Ockels in the Spacelab, 1985

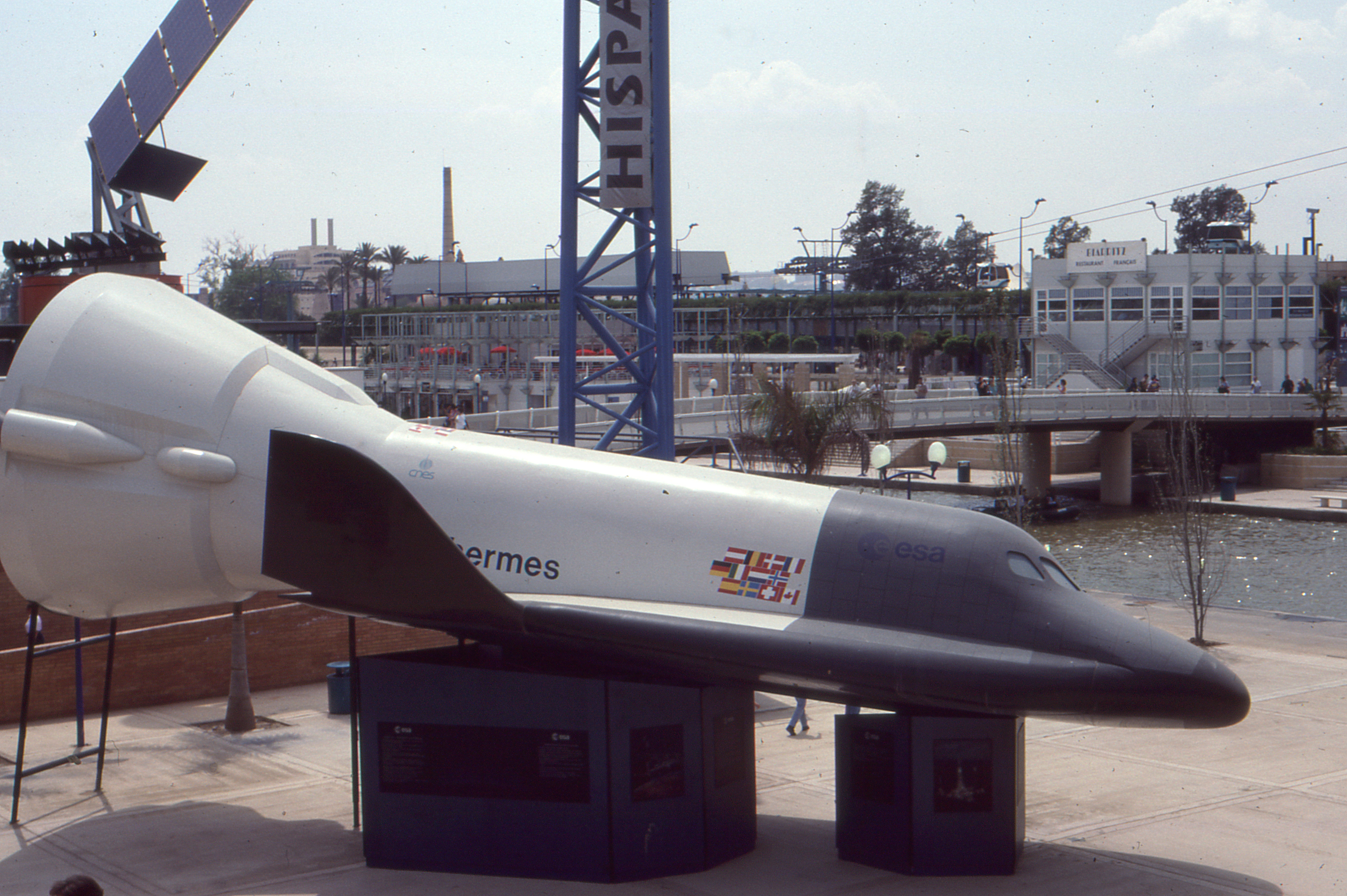
Hermes mockup on display during the Sevilla Expo 92

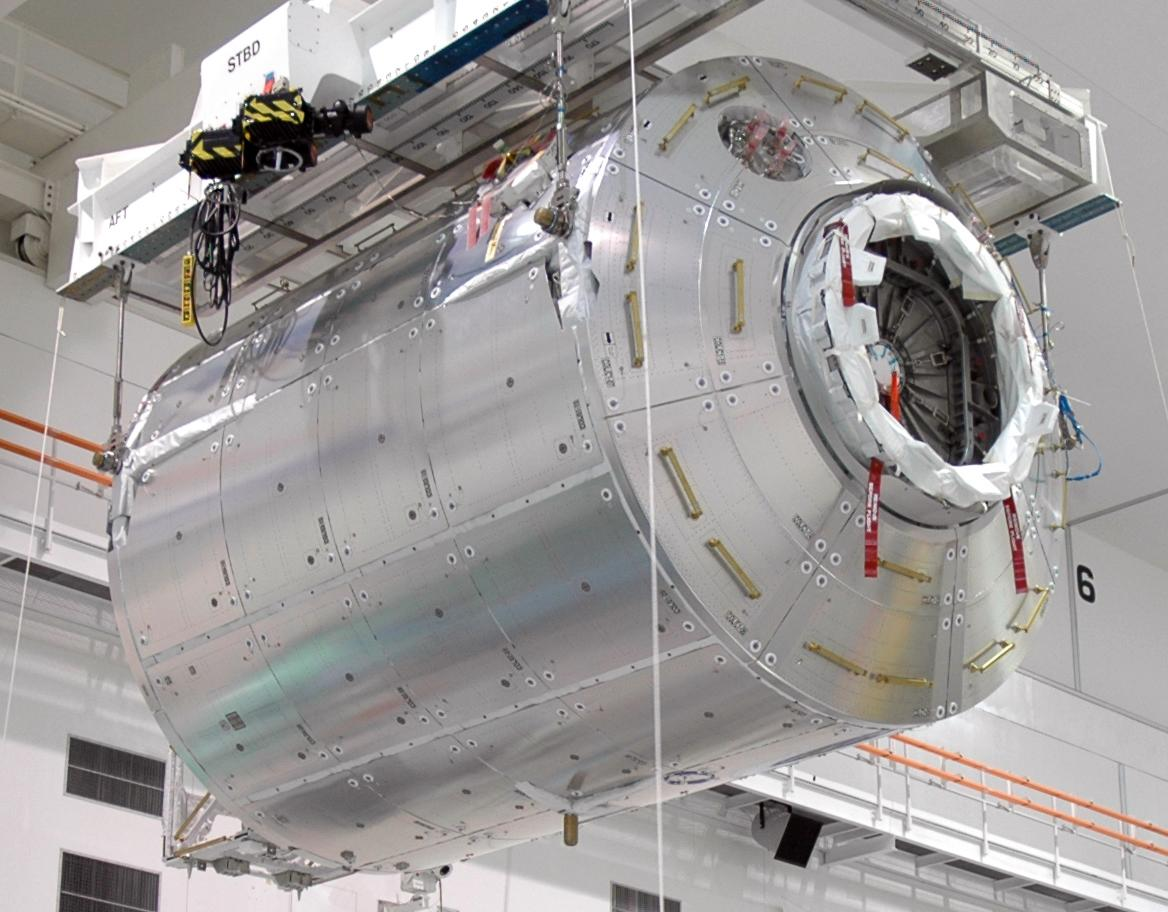
ISS module Columbus at Kennedy Space Center's Space Station Processing Facility

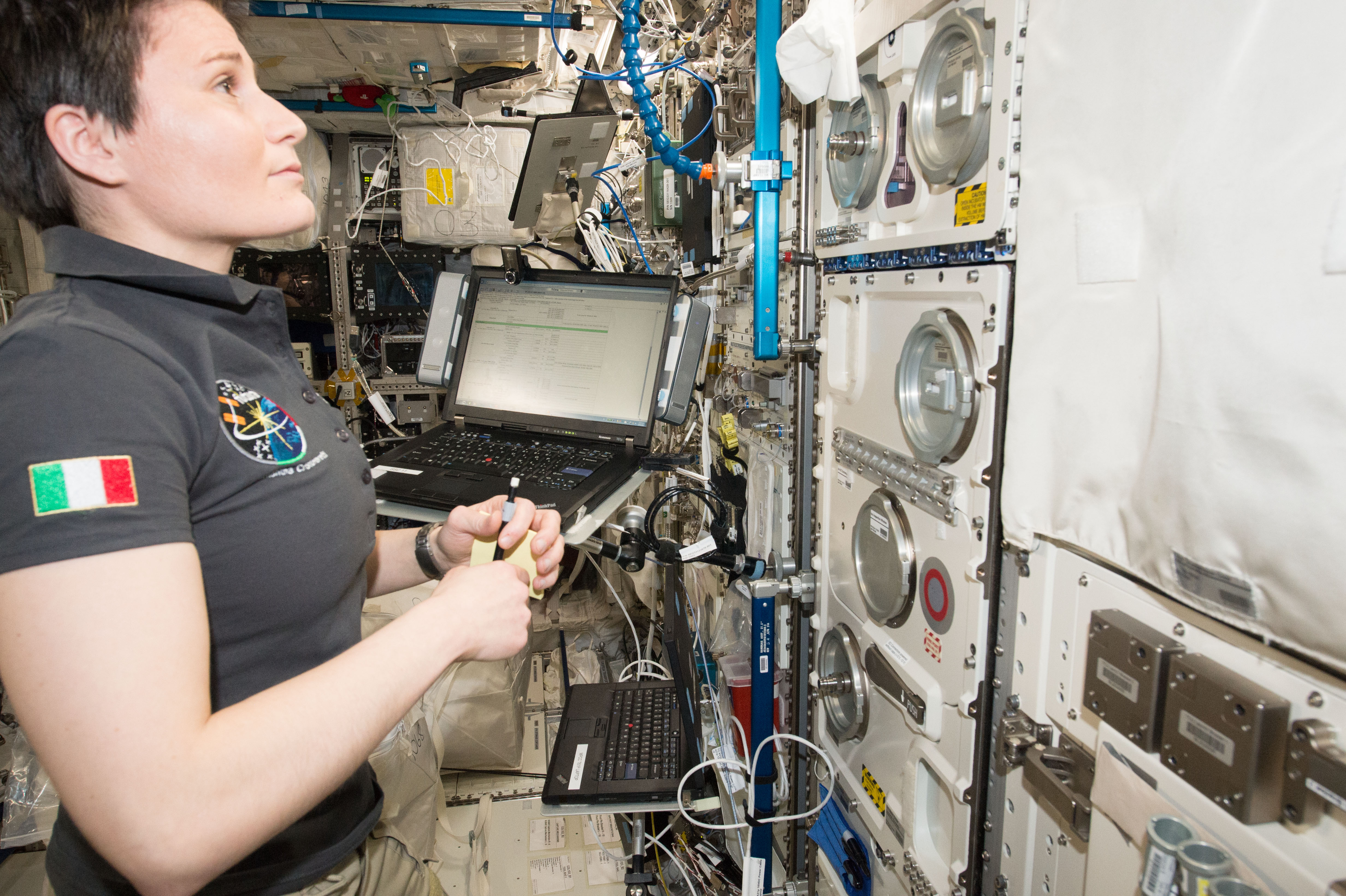
Samantha Cristoforetti on the Biolab in the Columbus module

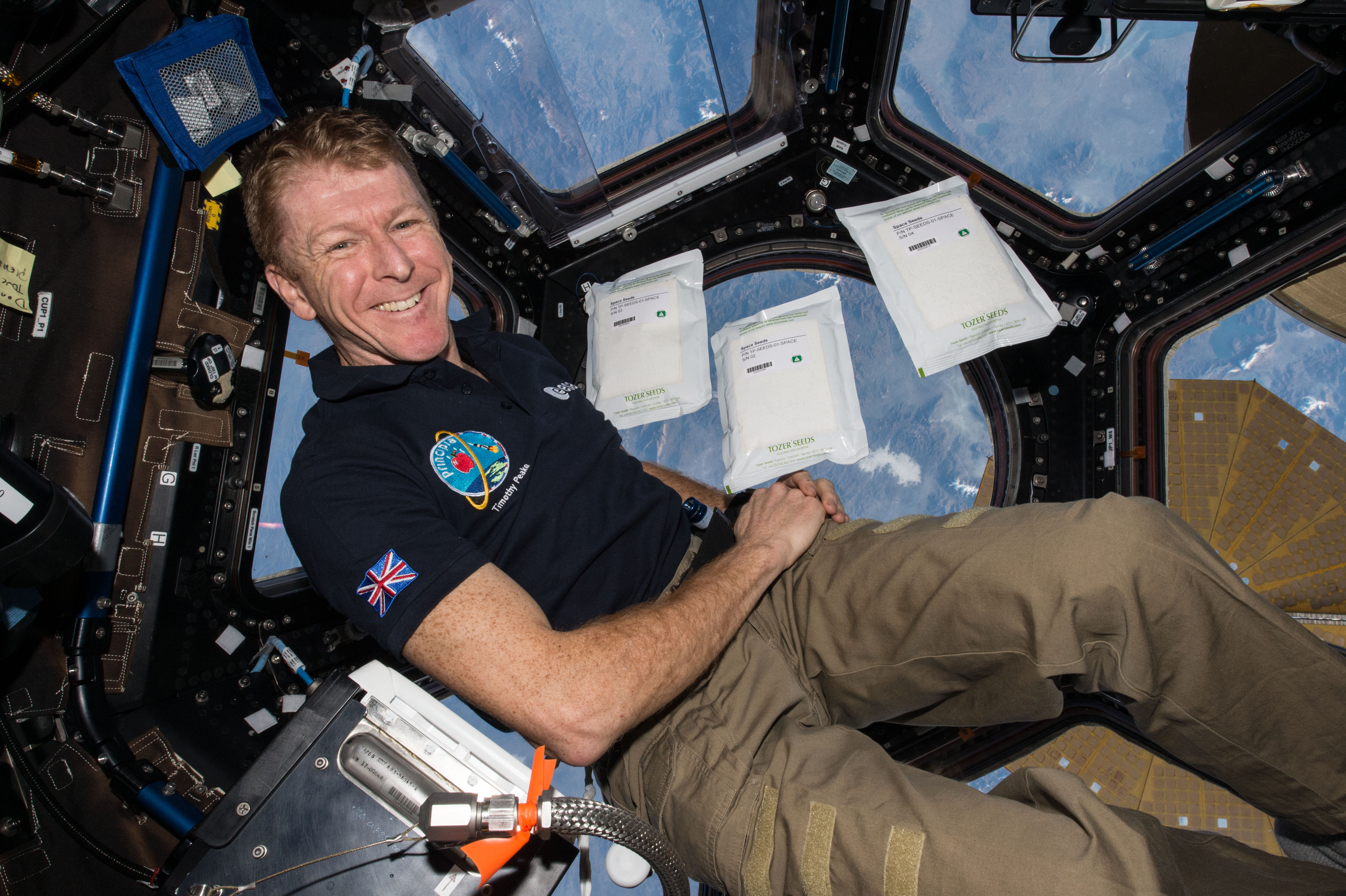
Timothy Peake in the Cupola

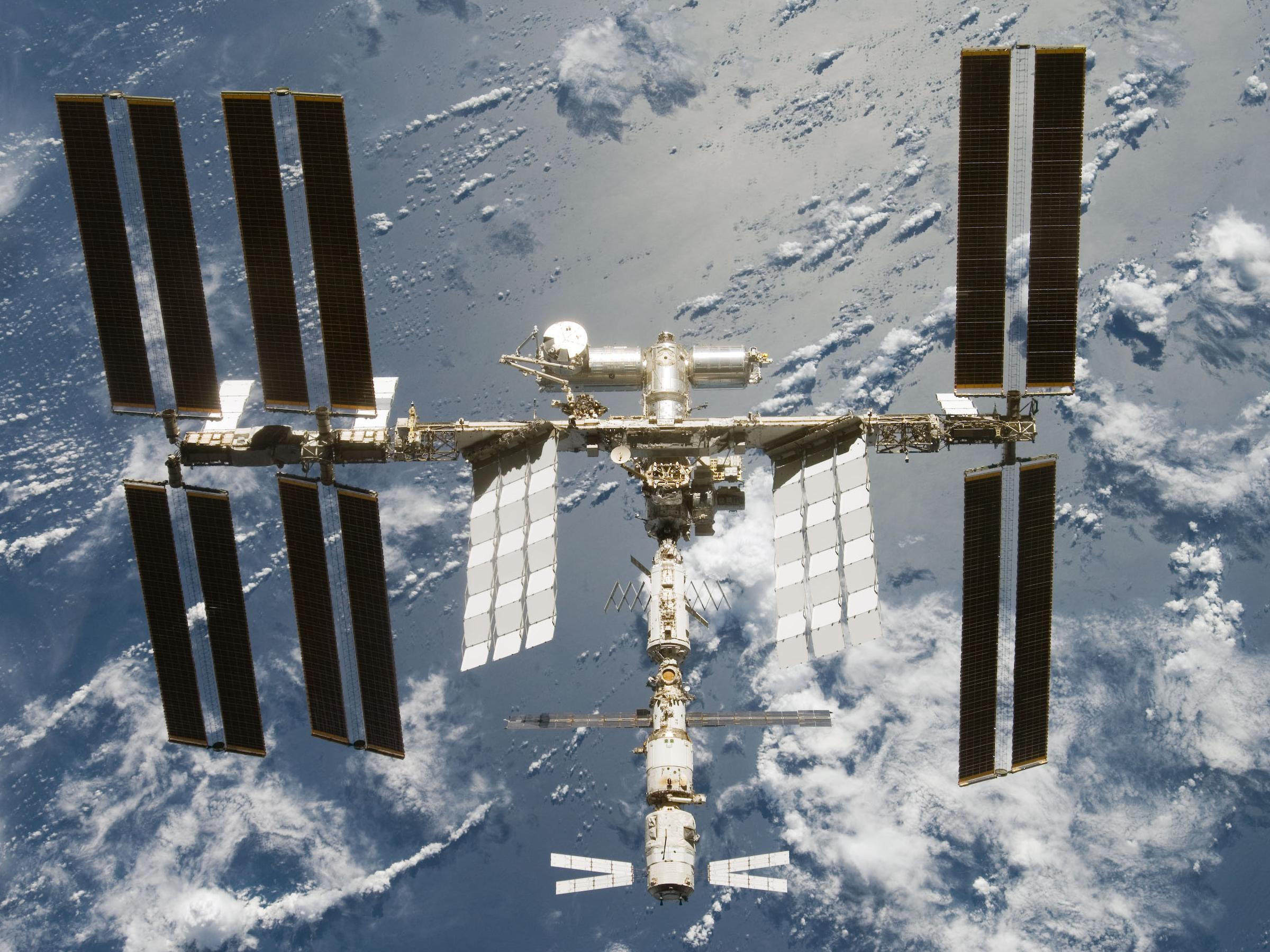
ATV Jules Verne seen at the bottom of the ISS

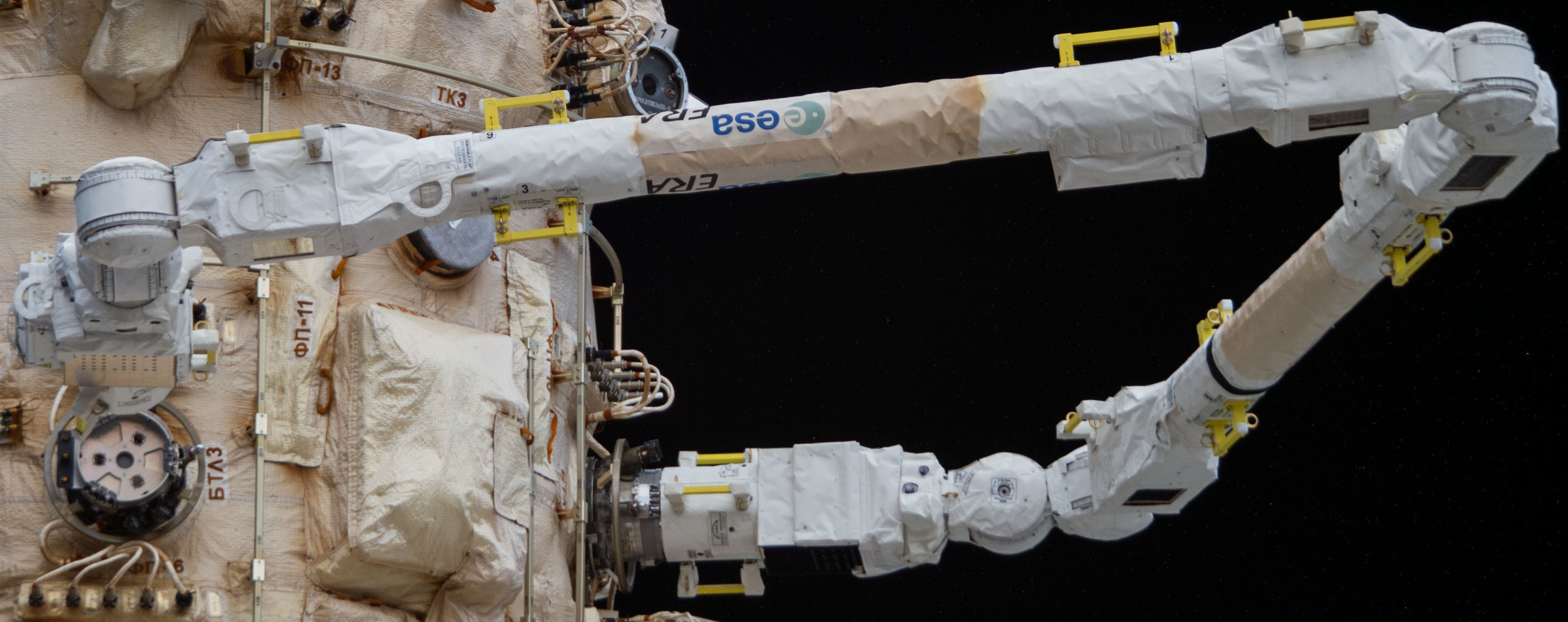
European Robotic Arm

At the time the ESA was formed, its main goals did not encompass human space flight; rather it considered itself to be primarily a scientific research organisation for uncrewed space exploration in contrast to its American and Soviet counterparts. Non-Soviet European in space was not an ESA astronaut on a European space craft; it was Czechoslovak Vladimír Remek who in 1978 became the first non-Soviet or American in space (the first man in space being Yuri Gagarin of the Soviet Union) – on a Soviet Soyuz spacecraft, followed by the Pole Mirosław Hermaszewski and East German Sigmund Jähn in the same year. This Soviet co-operation programme, known as Intercosmos, primarily involved the participation of Eastern bloc countries. In 1982, however, Jean-Loup Chrétien became the first non-Communist Bloc astronaut on a flight to the Soviet Salyut 7 space station.

Because Chrétien did not officially fly into space as an ESA astronaut, but rather as a member of the French CNES astronaut corps, the German Ulf Merbold is considered the first ESA astronaut to fly into space. He participated in the STS-9 Space Shuttle mission that included the first use of the European-built Spacelab in 1983. STS-9 marked the beginning of an extensive ESA/NASA joint partnership that included dozens of space flights of ESA astronauts in the following years. Some of these missions with Spacelab were fully funded and organisationally and scientifically controlled by the ESA (such as two missions by Germany and one by Japan) with European astronauts as full crew members rather than guests on board. Beside paying for Spacelab flights and seats on the shuttles, the ESA continued its human space flight co-operation with the Soviet Union and later Russia, including numerous visits to Mir.

During the latter half of the 1980s, European human space flights changed from being the exception to routine and therefore, in 1990, the European Astronaut Centre in Cologne, Germany was established. It selects and trains prospective astronauts and is responsible for the co-ordination with international partners, especially with regard to the International Space Station. As of 2006, the ESA astronaut corps officially included twelve members, including nationals from most large European countries except the United Kingdom.

In 2008, the ESA started to recruit new astronauts so that final selection would be due in spring 2009. Almost 10,000 people registered as astronaut candidates before registration ended in June 2008. 8,413 fulfilled the initial application criteria. Of the applicants, 918 were chosen to take part in the first stage of psychological testing, which narrowed down the field to 192. After two-stage psychological tests and medical evaluation in early 2009, as well as formal interviews, six new members of the European Astronaut Corps were selected – five men and one woman.

=== Crew vehicles ===
In the 1980s, France pressed for an independent European crew launch vehicle. Around 1978, it was decided to pursue a reusable spacecraft model and starting in November 1987 a project to create a mini-shuttle by the name of Hermes was introduced. The craft was comparable to early proposals for the Space Shuttle and consisted of a small reusable spaceship that would carry 3 to 5 astronauts and 3 to 4 metric tons of payload for scientific experiments. With a total maximum weight of 21 metric tons it would have been launched on the Ariane 5 rocket, which was being developed at that time. It was planned solely for use in low Earth orbit space flights. The planning and pre-development phase concluded in 1991; the production phase was never fully implemented because at that time the political landscape had changed significantly. With the fall of the Soviet Union, the ESA looked forward to co-operation with Russia to build a next-generation space vehicle. Thus the Hermes programme was cancelled in 1992 after about 3 billion dollars had been spent. The Columbus space station programme had a similar fate.

In the 21st century, ESA started new programmes to create its own crew vehicles, most notable among its various projects and proposals is Hopper, whose prototype by EADS, called Phoenix, has already been tested. While projects such as Hopper are neither concrete nor to be realised within the next decade, other possibilities for human spaceflight in co-operation with Roscosmos (the Russian space agency) have emerged. Following talks with Roscosmos in 2004 and June 2005, a co-operation between the ESA and Roscosmos was announced to jointly work on the Russian-designed Kliper, a reusable spacecraft that would be available for space travel beyond LEO (e.g. the moon or even Mars). It was speculated that Europe would finance part of it. A€50 million participation study for Kliper, which was expected to be approved in December 2005, was finally not approved by ESA member states. The Russian state tender for the project was subsequently cancelled in 2006.

In June 2006, ESA member states granted 15 million to the Crew Space Transportation System (CSTS) study, a two-year study to design a spacecraft capable of going beyond Low-Earth orbit based on the current Soyuz design. This project was pursued with Roskosmos instead of the cancelled Kliper proposal. A decision on the actual implementation and construction of the CSTS spacecraft was contemplated for 2008. In mid-2009 EADS Astrium was awarded a €21 million study into designing a crew vehicle based on the European ATV which was believed to be the basis of the Advanced Crew Transportation System design. Neither of these projects was pursued further in the 2010s.

In November 2012, ESA decided to join NASA's Orion programme. The ATV would form the basis of the European Service Module (ESM) for NASA's new crewed spacecraft. ESA may also seek to work with NASA on Orion's launch system as well to secure a seat on the spacecraft for its own astronauts. The complete Orion with ESM flew on its first mission to Lunar orbit in 2022.

In September 2014, the ESA signed an agreement with Sierra Nevada Corporation for co-operation in Dream Chaser project. Further studies on the Dream Chaser for European Use or DC4EU project were funded, including the feasibility of launching a Europeanised Dream Chaser onboard Ariane 5.

=== International Space Station (ISS) ===
With regard to the International Space Station (ISS), the ESA is not represented by all of its member states: 11 of the 22 ESA member states currently participate in the project: Belgium, Denmark, France, Germany, Italy, Netherlands, Norway, Spain, Sweden, Switzerland, and the United Kingdom. Austria, Finland and Ireland chose not to participate, because of lack of interest or concerns about the expense of the project. Portugal, Luxembourg, Greece, the Czech Republic, Romania, Poland, Estonia, and Hungary joined ESA after the agreement had been signed.

ESA takes part in the construction and operation of the ISS, with contributions such as Columbus, a science laboratory module that was brought into orbit by NASA's STS-122 Space Shuttle mission, and the Cupola observatory module that was completed in July 2005 by Alenia Spazio for the ESA. The current estimates for the ISS are approaching €100 billion in total (development, construction and 10 years of maintaining the station) of which the ESA has committed to paying €8 billion. About 90% of the costs of the ESA's ISS share will be contributed by Germany (41%), France (28%) and Italy (20%). German ESA astronaut Thomas Reiter was the first long-term ISS crew member.

ESA has developed the Automated Transfer Vehicle for ISS resupply. Each ATV has a cargo capacity of 7,667 kilograms (16,903 lb). The first ATV, Jules Verne, was launched on 9 March 2008 and on 3 April 2008 successfully docked with the ISS. This manoeuvre, considered a major technical feat, involved using automated systems to allow the ATV to track the ISS, moving at 27,000 km/h, and attach itself with an accuracy of 2 cm. Five vehicles were launched before the programme ended with the launch of the fifth ATV, Georges Lemaître, in 2014.

European Life and Physical Sciences research on board the International Space Station (ISS) is mainly based on the European Programme for Life and Physical Sciences in Space programme that was initiated in 2001.

== Cooperation with other countries and organisations ==
The ESA has signed co-operation agreements with the following states that currently neither plan to integrate as tightly with ESA institutions as Canada, nor envision future membership of the ESA: Argentina, Brazil, China, India, Russia, and Turkey. Additionally, the ESA has joint projects with the EUSPA of the European Union, NASA of the United States and is participating in the International Space Station together with the United States (NASA), Russia (Roscosmos), Japan (JAXA), and Canada (CSA).

=== National space organisations of member states ===
- The Centre National d'Études Spatiales (CNES) (National Centre for Space Study) is the French government space agency (administratively, a "public establishment of industrial and commercial character"). Its headquarters are in central Paris. CNES is the main participant on the Ariane project. Indeed, CNES designed and tested all Ariane family rockets (mainly from its centre in Évry near Paris)
- The UK Space Agency is a partnership of the UK government departments which are active in space. Through the UK Space Agency, the partners provide delegates to represent the UK on the various ESA governing bodies. Each partner funds its own programme.
- The Italian Space Agency (Agenzia Spaziale Italiana or ASI) was founded in 1988 to promote, co-ordinate and conduct space activities in Italy. Operating under the Ministry of the Universities and of Scientific and Technological Research, the agency cooperates with numerous entities active in space technology and with the president of the Council of Ministers. Internationally, the ASI provides Italy's delegation to the Council of the European Space Agency and to its subordinate bodies.
- The German Aerospace Center (DLR) (German: Deutsches Zentrum für Luft- und Raumfahrt e. V.) is the national research centre for aviation and space flight of the Federal Republic of Germany and of other member states in the Helmholtz Association. Its extensive research and development projects are included in national and international cooperative programmes. In addition to its research projects, the centre is the assigned space agency of Germany bestowing headquarters of German space flight activities and its associates.
- The Instituto Nacional de Técnica Aeroespacial (INTA) (National Institute for Aerospace Technique) is a Public Research Organisation specialised in aerospace research and technology development in Spain. Among other functions, it serves as a platform for space research and acts as a significant testing facility for the aeronautic and space sector in the country.

=== NASA ===
The ESA has a long history of collaboration with NASA. Since ESA's astronaut corps was formed, the Space Shuttle has been the primary launch vehicle used by the ESA's astronauts to get into space through partnership programmes with NASA. In the 1980s and 1990s, the Spacelab programme was an ESA-NASA joint research programme that had the ESA develop and manufacture orbital labs for the Space Shuttle for several flights in which the ESA participates with astronauts in experiments.

In October 2020, ESA entered into a memorandum of understanding (MOU) with NASA to collaborate on the Artemis program, which would provide an orbiting Lunar Gateway and also accomplish the first crewed lunar landing in 50 years. Gateway was later cancelled by NASA.

ESA purchases seats on the NASA operated Commercial Crew Program. The first ESA astronaut to be on a Commercial Crew Program mission was Thomas Pesquet who launched into space aboard Crew Dragon Endeavour on the Crew-2 mission. Following ESA astronauts on Crew Dragon missions were Matthias Maurer (Crew-3), Samantha Cristoforetti (Crew-4), and others.

In robotic science mission and exploration missions, NASA has been the ESA's main partner. Cassini–Huygens was a joint NASA-ESA mission, along with the Infrared Space Observatory, INTEGRAL, SOHO, and others. The Hubble Space Telescope and James Webb Space Telescope are joint projects of NASA and ESA. Possible future ESA-NASA joint projects include the Laser Interferometer Space Antenna, Mars sample-return mission, and others.

=== JAXA ===
ESA and the Japanese Space Agency (JAXA) have engaged in long-standing collaboration in various domains of space exploration, satellite technology, space science, and human spaceflight. Their partnership has evolved over the decades, focusing on joint missions, technology sharing, and international cooperation in space exploration. Some of the programmes include BepiColombo Mission, EarthCARE, Hera, and Comet Interceptor. In 2025, ESA opened its first Asian office in Tokyo, Japan.

=== Roscosmos ===
In the 2000s and 2010s, ESA collaborated with Roscosmos (the Russian space agency) on the development of the crewed vehicle CSTS (later cancelled), the use of French Guiana's Guiana Space Centre spaceport for launches of Soyuz-2 rockets, and the ExoMars programme including the Schiaparelli lander and the Trace Gas Orbiter. In 2022, most collaboration with the Roscosmos was terminated after the 2022 Russian invasion of Ukraine.

=== CNSA ===
ESA and the Chinese Space Agency (CNSA) cooperated on development of the Double Star Mission. In 2017, ESA sent two astronauts to China for two weeks sea survival training with Chinese astronauts in Yantai, Shandong. In 2024, the joint Einstein Probe was launched. The joint ESA-CAS mission SMILE was launched in 2026 to image for the first time the magnetosphere of the Sun in soft X-rays and UV.

=== ISRO ===
ESA provided instruments for the Indian Space Research Organisation (ISRO)'s lunar mission Chandrayaan-1 in 2008. Since 2024, ESA has been supporting ISRO's human spaceflight programme Gaganyaan.

=== AfSA ===
ESA has been cooperating with the African Union's African Space Agency (AfSA) since its formation (itself inspired by ESA) in 2023.

=== ASA ===
Since 2023, the Australian Space Agency was funding the training of Katherine Bennell-Pegg at the European Astronaut Centre. In 2026, Australia started negotiating with ESA about a possible flight of Bennell-Pegg to ISS under the Australian flag, possibly on the EPIC mission.

== Link between ESA and EU ==
The ESA is an independent space agency and not under the jurisdiction of the European Union, although they have common goals, share funding, and work together often. The initial aim of the European Union (EU) was to make the European Space Agency an agency of the EU by 2014. While the EU and its member states fund together 86% of the budget of the ESA, it is not an EU agency. Furthermore, the ESA has several non-EU members, most notably the United Kingdom which left the EU while remaining a full member of the ESA. The ESA is partnered with the EU on two space programmes, the Copernicus series of Earth observation satellites and the Galileo satellite navigation system. The ESA provided technical oversight for both as well as funding for Copernicus. The EU has shown interest in expanding into space exploration with a proposal to rename and further develop its satellite navigation agency (the European GNSS Agency) into the new EU Agency for the Space Programme. The ESA strongly criticized the proposal, as it was seen as competition or replacement of the ESA.

In January 2021, after years of acrimonious relations, EU and ESA officials mended their relationship, with the EU Internal Market commissioner Thierry Breton saying "The European space policy will continue to rely on the ESA and its unique technical, engineering and science expertise," and that the "ESA will continue to be the European agency for space matters. If we are to be successful in our European strategy for space, and we will be, I will need the ESA by my side." ESA director Aschbacher reciprocated, saying "I would really like to make the ESA the main agency, the go-to agency of the European Commission for all its flagship programmes." The ESA and EUSPA are now seen to have distinct roles and competencies, which will be officialised in the Financial Framework Partnership Agreement (FFPA). The ESA's focus will be on the technical elements of the EU space programmes, the EUSPA will handle the operational elements of those programmes.

== Employment ==
As of 2023, Many other facilities are operated by national space agencies in close collaboration with the ESA. The ESA employs around 2,547 people, and thousands of contractors. Initially, new employees are contracted for an expandable four-year term, which is until the organisation's retirement age of 63. According to the ESA's documents, the staff can receive myriad of perks, such as financial childcare support, retirement plans, and financial help when migrating. The ESA also prevents employees from disclosing any private documents or correspondences to outside parties. Ars Technica's 2023 report, which contained testimonies of 18 people, suggested that there is a widespread harassment between management and its employees, especially with its contractors. Since the ESA is an international organisation, unaffiliated with any single nation, any form of legal action is difficult to raise against the organisation.

== Security incidents ==
On 3 August 1984, the ESA's Paris headquarters were severely damaged and six people were hurt when a bomb exploded. It was planted by the far-left armed Action Directe group.

On 14 December 2015, hackers from Anonymous breached the ESA's subdomains and leaked thousands of login credentials.

In late December 2025, ESA servers suffered a data breach, the extent and severity of which was disputed.

== See also ==
- European integration § Space
- European Space Security and Education Centre
- Eurospace
- List of European Space Agency programmes and missions
- List of ESA CubeSats
- List of government space agencies
- SEDS
- Space Night

=== European Union matters ===
- Agencies of the European Union
- Directorate-General for Defence Industry and Space
- Enhanced co-operation
- European Union Agency for the Space Programme
