= Enlargement of the European Space Agency =

Accession of new countries to the ESA

ESA member states, CA and ECA states: ESA member states ECS states Signed Cooperation Agreement Associated states

The European Space Agency (ESA) was founded in 1975 when the European Space Research Organisation (ESRO) merged with the European Launcher Development Organisation (ELDO). The ESA Convention was signed by the ESRO and ELDO members on 30 May 1975 and by Ireland on 31 December 1975. Canada signed a Cooperation Agreement on 9 December 1978. The Convention entered into force on 30 October 1980 after the ratification procedures in the 10 ESRO/ELDO members were finalised.

== Current membership ==
The current membership of the European Space Agency includes 23 member states, four associate members and one cooperating state:

State	Cooperation Agreement	ECS Agreement	PECS Charter	ESA Convention signature	Ratification	National Program
(European Union) Austria	1979 for associate membership			12 April 1984	30 December 1986	FFG
(European Union) Belgium	ESA Founding member			30 May 1975	3 October 1978	BELSPO
Canada	9 December 1978; January 1984; May 1989; January 2000; 15 December 2010					CSA
(European Union) Cyprus	27 August 2009	6 July 2016	2017			through DMRID
(European Union) Czechia	1996	24 November 2003	24 November 2004	8 July 2008	12 August 2008	through MoT
(European Union) Denmark	ESA Founding member			30 May 1975	15 September 1977	DTU Space
(European Union) Estonia	20 June 2007	10 November 2009	22 September 2010	4 February 2015	1 September 2015	ESO
(European Union) Finland	1987 for associate membership			22 March 1994	1 January 1995	through MoEAE
(European Union) France	ESA Founding member			30 May 1975	30 October 1980	CNES
(European Union) Germany	ESA Founding member			30 May 1975	26 July 1977	DLR
(European Union) Greece	January 2001	—N/a	—N/a	19 July 2004	9 March 2005	HSC
(European Union) Hungary	April 1991	7 April 2003	1st: 5 November 2003; 2nd: 26 September 2008; 3rd: 17 October 2013	24 February 2015	4 November 2015	HSO
(European Union) Ireland	ESA Founding member			31 December 1975	10 December 1980	Enterprise Ireland
(European Union) Italy	ESA Founding member			30 May 1975	20 February 1978	ASI
(European Union) Latvia	23 July 2009	19 March 2013	30 January 2015			LSO
(European Union) Lithuania	7 October 2010	7 October 2014	28 September 2015			LSO
(European Union) Luxembourg	September 2000	—N/a	—N/a	6 May 2004	30 June 2005	LSA
(European Union) Netherlands	ESA Founding member			30 May 1975	6 February 1979	NLSA
Norway	1981 for associate membership			12 December 1985	30 December 1986	NSA
(European Union) Poland	28 January 1994	27 April 2007	28 April 2008	13 September 2012	19 November 2012	POLSA
(European Union) Portugal	1996	—N/a	—N/a	4 October 2000	14 November 2000	PT Space
(European Union) Romania	December 1992	17 February 2006	16 February 2007	20 January 2011	22 December 2011	ROSA
(European Union) Slovakia	28 April 2010	16 February 2015	4 February 2016			SSO
(European Union) Slovenia	28 May 2008	22 January 2010	30 November 2010	18 June 2024	1 January 2025	through MoHEST
(European Union) Spain	ESA Founding member			30 May 1975	7 February 1979	AEE
(European Union) Sweden	ESA Founding member			30 May 1975	6 April 1976	SNSA
Switzerland	ESA Founding member			30 May 1975	19 November 1976	SSO
United Kingdom	ESA Founding member			30 May 1975	28 March 1978	UKSA

== Associate members ==
The ESA Convention does not require acquisition of the status of an associate member in order for a state to become a full member. The association status is envisaged to allow associate member states to take part in ESA's deliberative bodies and decision-making and also in ESA's programmes and activities. Associate member state firms can bid for and receive contracts to work on programmes. The accord has a provision ensuring a fair industrial return to the associate members.

Previously, associate members were Austria, Norway, Finland and Slovenia, all of which later joined ESA as full members. Portugal, Greece and Luxembourg skipped associate membership and moved from Cooperation Agreements to full ESA membership. The Czech Republic also skipped associate membership, but it went through the new enlargement process via Cooperation Agreement, ECS Agreement and PECS Charter implementation.

Currently there are four associate members: Latvia, Lithuania, Slovakia, and Cyprus.

Despite that the provisions in the ESA Convention do not show restrictions that only European states can join, the ESA Council implements such rule de facto and that is why Canada has only the status of a cooperating state. However, it is integrated with the ESA institutions as tightly as possible for a non-member state.

The ELDO associate member Australia (CSIRO) decided not to continue as an associate member of ESA. Nevertheless, on 5 March 2003 the first of ESA's deep space ground stations in the world opened in Western Australia in an inauguration ceremony.

== Enlargement ==
ESA member states ESA associate states and ESA cooperating state (Canada) 2nd stage: ECS states 1st stage: signed Cooperation Agreement

After the decision of the ESA Council of 21/22 March 2001 the procedure for accession of the European states was detailed as described here. Nations who want to become a full member of ESA do so in 3 stages. First a Cooperation Agreement is signed between the country and ESA. In this stage the country has very limited financial responsibilities. If a country wants to cooperate more fully with ESA it signs a European Cooperating State (ECS) agreement.

The ECS Agreement makes companies based in the country eligible for participation in ESA procurements. The country can also participate in all ESA programmes, except for the Basic Technology Research Programme. While the financial contribution of the country concerned increases, it is still much lower than that of a full member state. The agreement is normally followed by a Plan for European Cooperating State (or PECS Charter).

This is a 5-year program of basic research and development activities aimed at improving the nations' space industry capacity. At the end of the 5-year period, the country can either begin negotiations to become a full member state or an associated state or sign a new PECS Charter. ESA is likely to expand quite rapidly in the coming years. Many countries, most of which joined the EU in both 2004 and 2007, have started to cooperate with ESA on various levels.

Progress of all the states that have taken or are taking part in the enlargement process
Applicant state	Cooperation Agreement	ECS Agreement	PECS Charter	Association agreement signature	Associated membership	ESA Convention signature	Full Membership	National Program
(European Union) Austria	—N/a	—N/a	—N/a	17 October 1979		12 April 1984	30 December 1986	ALR
Norway	—N/a	—N/a	—N/a	April 1981		12 December 1985	30 December 1986	NSA
(European Union) Finland	—N/a	—N/a	—N/a	1 January 1987		22 March 1994	1 January 1995	through TEM
(European Union) Portugal	1996	—N/a	—N/a	—N/a	—N/a	4 October 2000	14 November 2000	PT Space
(European Union) Greece	January 2001	—N/a	—N/a	—N/a	—N/a	19 July 2004	9 March 2005	HSC
(European Union) Luxembourg	September 2000	—N/a	—N/a	—N/a	—N/a	6 May 2004	30 June 2005	LSA
(European Union) Czechia	1996	24 November 2003	24 November 2004	—N/a	—N/a	8 July 2008	12 August 2008	through MoT
(European Union) Romania	December 1992	17 February 2006	16 February 2007	—N/a	—N/a	20 January 2011	23 December 2011	ROSA
(European Union) Poland	28 January 1994	27 April 2007	28 April 2008	—N/a	—N/a	13 September 2012	19 November 2012	POLSA
(European Union) Estonia	20 June 2007	10 November 2009	22 September 2010	—N/a	—N/a	4 February 2015	1 September 2015	ESO
(European Union) Hungary	April 1991	7 April 2003	1st: 5 November 2003 2nd: 26 September 2008 3rd: 17 October 2013	—N/a	—N/a	24 February 2015	4 November 2015	HSO
(European Union) Slovenia	28 May 2008	22 January 2010	30 November 2010	5 July 2016	1 December 2016	18 June 2024	1 January 2025	through MoHEST
(European Union) Latvia	23 July 2009	19 March 2013	30 January 2015	30 June 2020	27 July 2020			LSO
(European Union) Lithuania	7 October 2010	7 October 2014	28 September 2015	28 April 2021	21 May 2021			LSA
(European Union) Slovakia	28 April 2010	16 February 2015	4 February 2016	14 June 2022	13 October 2022			SSO
(European Union) Bulgaria	—N/a	8 April 2015	4 February 2016					SRTI
(European Union) Cyprus	27 August 2009	6 July 2016	2017	23 October 2025	19 March 2026			through MoCW
(European Union) Croatia	19 February 2018	23 March 2023	16 August 2023					through MoSEY
(European Union) Malta	20 February 2012	18 October 2024	13 November 2024					MCST
Turkey	15 July 2004							TUA
Ukraine	25 January 2008							SSAU
Israel	30 January 2011							ISA

=== Possible future cooperation ===
The political perspective of the European Union (EU) had been to make ESA an agency of the EU by 2014, however, this date was not met. The EU is already the largest single donor to ESA's budget and non-ESA EU states are observers at ESA.

Three non-EU nations — Israel, Turkey and Ukraine — have cooperation agreements with ESA. Agency officials consider the prospects of full membership for these three countries as remote at the current time.

However, ESA ministers instructed agency officials to begin discussions with Australia, Israel and South Africa on future association agreements with ESA. The ministers noted that “concrete cooperation is at an advanced stage” with these nations and that “prospects for mutual benefits are existing”.

Besides EU countries, the EFTA members Norway and Switzerland are also members of ESA. Neither the remaining EFTA member states of Iceland and Liechtenstein nor the EU candidates not listed above have publicly expressed their intention to participate in the European Space Agency's activities.

In 2016, certain ESA programs were extended to Eastern Partnership member states. Armenia, Georgia and Moldova joined the ESA's Earth Observation for Eastern Partnership initiative. This move brought new perspectives to develop cooperation between the ESA and Eastern European countries. The project aims to achieve an increase in the uptake of satellite-based environmental information, while promoting regional cooperation and knowledge exchange.

== See also ==
- European Launcher Development Organisation (ELDO)
- European Space Agency (ESA)
- European Space Research Organisation (ESRO)
