= Enlargement =

Enlargement may refer to:

- the growth in membership of political entities:
  - Enlargement of the European Union is the political process for integrating countries into the European Union.
  - Enlargement of the African Union
  - Enlargement of the Arab League
  - Enlargement of the United Nations
  - Enlargement of NATO
  - Enlargement of Switzerland
  - Enlargement of the European Space Agency
- in other contexts:
  - In mathematics, an enlargement is a uniform scaling, an example of a Homothetic transformation that increases distances, areas and volumes.
  - Enlargement (in fiction) is a theme in fiction, especially in science fiction and fantasy.
  - An enlargement is a photographic print that is larger than the negative it is printed from, through the use of an enlarger.
  - Penis enlargement.

== See also ==
- Expansion (disambiguation)
