= Space science in Estonia =

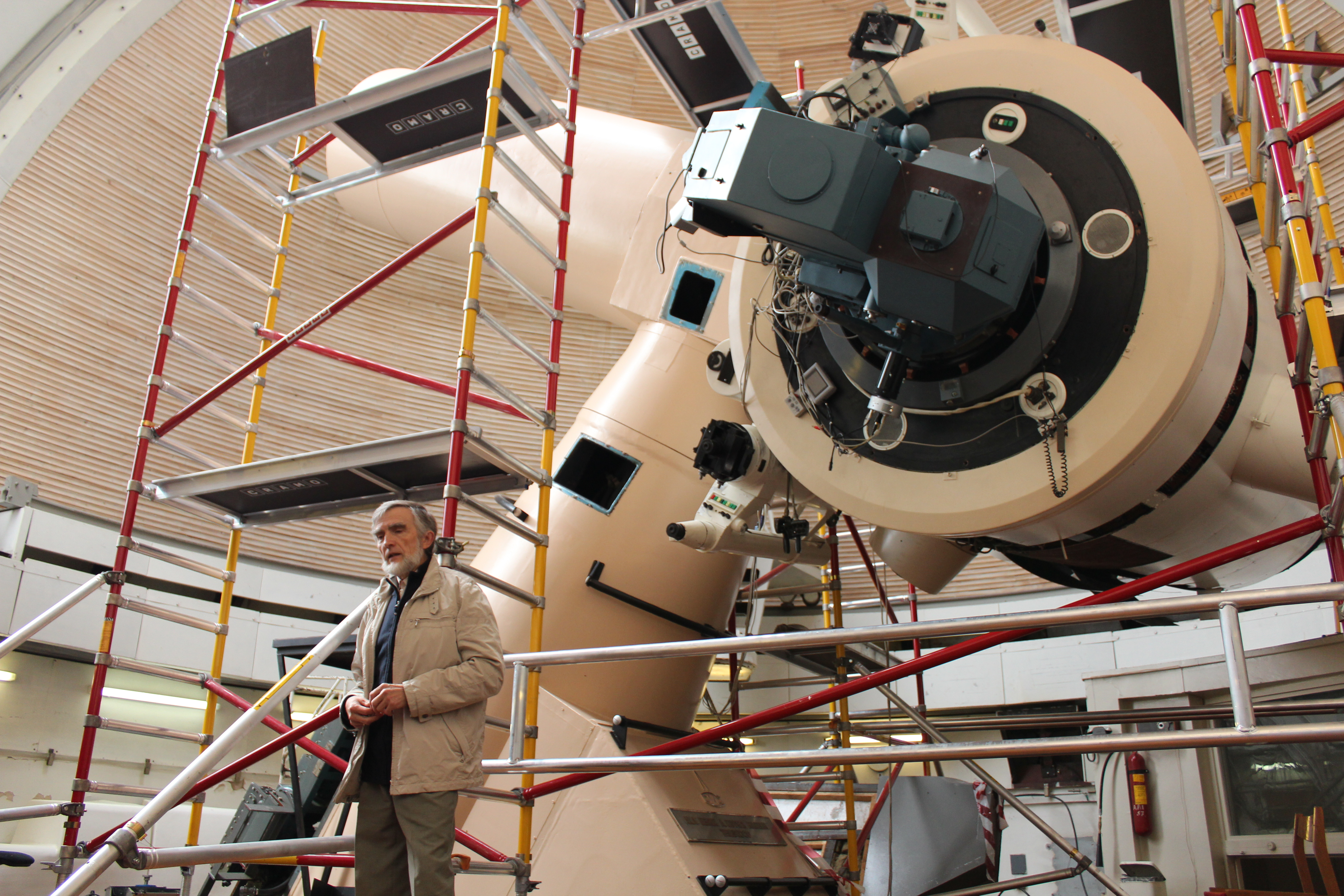
Tartu Observatory's Senior research associate Indrek Kolka is introducing guests Tartu Observatory's biggest telescope which is being upgraded.

The cornerstone of the Estonian cosmological research is the Tartu Observatory which was founded in 1812. The observatory itself has a long tradition of studying galaxies and theoretically modeling the structure of the universe and its formation. Till today this facility is Estonia's main research centre for astronomy and atmospheric physics, with fundamental research focusing on physics of galaxies, stellar physics and remote sensing of the Earth's atmosphere and ground surface. The observatory has also played a vital role in catapulting the career of Jaan Einasto, one of the most famous and eminent Estonian astrophysicists and one of the discoverers of "Dark Matter" and of the cellular structure of the Universe.

== Mir involvement ==
During the Cold War Estonia was associated with and active in the extensive space program of the USSR. In the early 1970s The first Soviet Saljut type space station was equipped with the Estonian built Mikron a shining night clouds observer device. Several upgrades of the device were in service till the mid-1980s till the introduction of a more advanced technology. In the mid-1980s a telespectrometer FAZA (also known as Phasa) was constructed in Estonia for the Soviet orbital space station Mir. The FAZA had a 10 arc-sec field-of-view and operated at 340-2850 nm and was fitted outside the Kvant-2 module. The device was used for study of the atmosphere and pollutants.

The first FAZA which was shipped on orbit at the Baikonur cosmodrome to enter service in the station Saljut 7, crashed down along with the station a year later in South America causing an international scandal for the Soviet Union in the region. Several years later in 1991 a joint space flight conducted by the Soviet Union and Austria ended the service of FAZA as the device was retired from service.

== ESA involvement ==
Estonia was the first Baltic State to sign a cooperation treaty with the European Space Agency in 2007. The Estonian Space Office coordinates with ESA within the country.

In 2015, Estonia joined the European Space Agency.

== Current programs ==
After re-gaining independence in 1991 its space research has mainly focused on cosmology. Since the 2000 the Estonian industry is again involved with the space sector where various specializing has taken place. Many Estonian companies are involved in the production of antennas for ground station for satellite communication, which have also contributed to the Mars Express mission. Furthermore, one of the Estonian companies built a large antenna reflector back structure for an ESA 35 metres radio telescope in Australia, which tracked Mars Express on its way to the red planet.

We might not go to space but we have a great opportunity to convey our ideas.

— director Laurits Leedjärv of the Tartu Observatory

=== Science programs ===
For several years Estonian scientists have collaborated with the ESA program Gaia, which launched a space probe in 2011 to measure the brightness and exact coordinates of millions of space objects, both in the Milky Way galaxy as well as in more distant galaxies. Estonian scientists have offered their advice on how to measure these objects by using spectrophotometry.

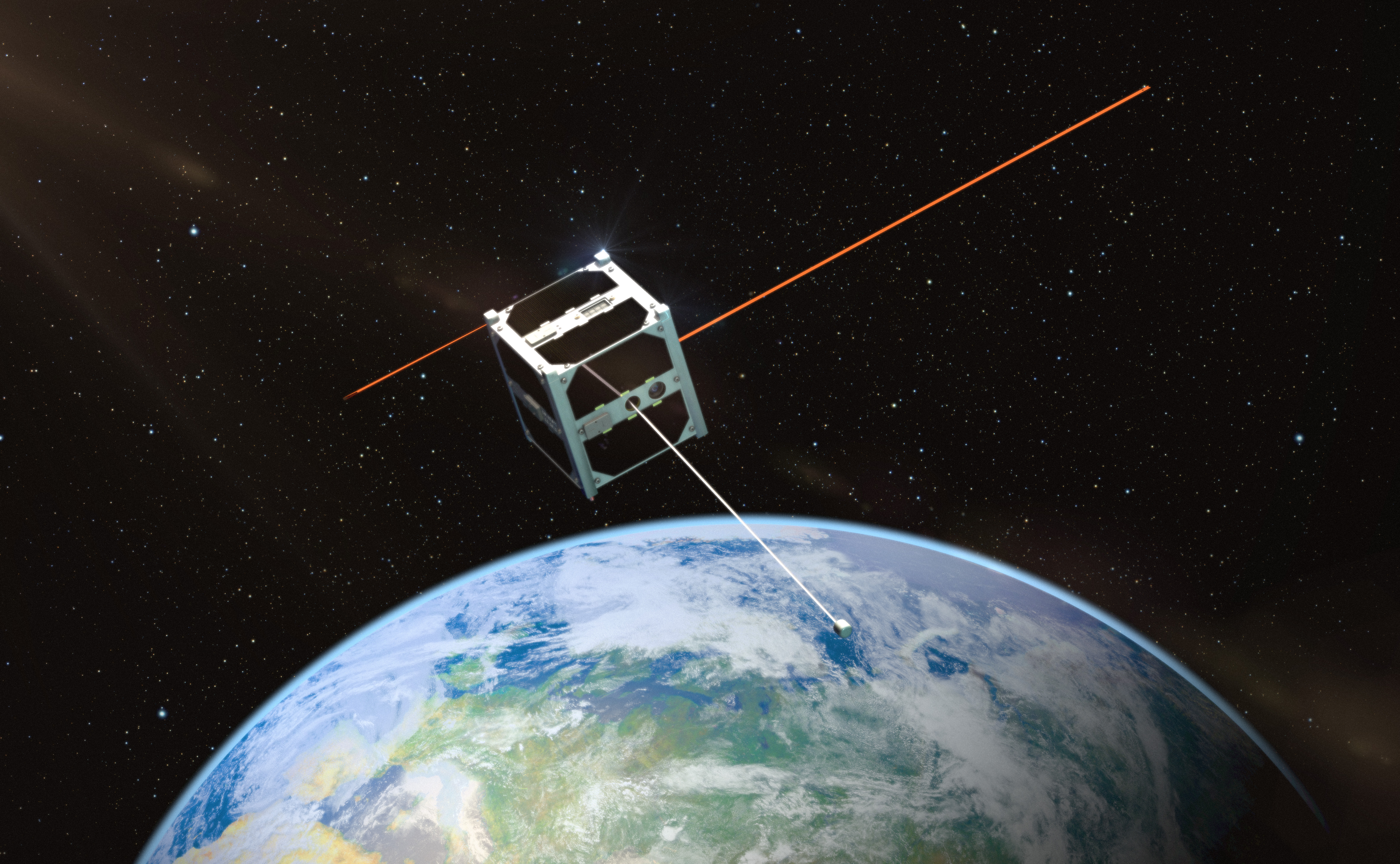
ESTCube-1.

=== Satellite programs ===
- 2013 a joint research satellite with Finland - a mission to gather data about the possible use of the solar wind.
- On 7 May 2013 ESTCube-1 was launched by a Vega rocket. Its mission was officially ended on 17 February 2015.
- On 9 October 2023 ESTCube-2 was launched by a Vega rocket.

== See also ==
- Soviet space program
- Mir orbital space station
