= Reaktor (company) =

Technology company

- Industry: Software, strategy, design
- Founded: 2000
- Number of locations: 5
- Key people: Pekka Horo (CEO) Mika Sutinen (Chairman of the board)
- Revenue: €120M (2023)
- Number of employees: 700
- Website: https://www.reaktor.com/

Reaktor is a technology company, specialised in design, development and strategy of digital services and products.

Founded in Finland in 2000, Reaktor has offices in New York, Amsterdam, Helsinki, Stockholm, and Tokyo. Reaktor employs 700 people. In 2023, its revenue amounted to 120 million euros, approximately $130M. Reaktor Group's CEO is Pekka Horo.

Reaktor builds digital products for clients including Finnair, Finavia, HBO, Adidas, Nasdaq, and Varian Medical Systems. Its work has been awarded and recognized by the Red Dot awards, Webby Awards, Emmy Awards, and German Design Council, among others.

In 2019, Reaktor was named as one of the World's Most Innovative Companies by the American business journal Fast Company.

Reaktor is known from being the creator of Elements of AI massive open online course (MOOC) with the University of Helsinki. The online course about artificial intelligence has been taken to over half a million participants worldwide.

Reaktor officially listed on the main regulated market of Nasdaq Helsinki on June 18, 2026, trading under the ticker symbol REAKTOR.

== Initiatives ==
In 2020, Fast Company listed Reaktor Education and the +POOL project in New York among world-changing ideas.

In 2019, Reaktor partnered with Columbia University and +POOL to build an installation in East River in New York. Named +POOL Light, the sculpture changes colors based on water conditions that are tracked by sensors and algorithms by the university and Reaktor.

On November 29, 2018, Finland's first commercially-built nanosatellite, Reaktor's Reaktor Hello World (SATCAT: 43743, COSPAR: 2018-096AA) was launched into space. The nanosatellite carried an infrared hyperspectral camera built by VTT Technical Research Centre of Finland. The satellite was built in collaboration with Aalto University and the same people who were behind the launch of Finland's first two satellites, Aalto 1 and Aalto 2. Reaktor's satellite platform is also used in the W-cube satellite by ESA, European Space Agency. Reaktor Hello World satellite decayed from orbit on 22 October 2023.

Elements of AI is a massive open online course (MOOC) designed and organized by Reaktor and the University of Helsinki. The course teaches the basics of artificial intelligence, and it was originally launched in 2018. With over half a million participants, the course is being translated into all official EU languages. The government of Finland has pledged to offer the course for all EU citizens by the end of 2021. In 2019, the course won the global grand prize in the Inclusive Innovation Challenge by the Massachusetts Institute of Technology.

Reaktor has also held the world's first coding championships in 2014 together with the Finnish game developer Supercell.
