= Estonian Space Office =

Government agency of Estonia

Space Estonia

Agency overview
- Jurisdiction: Government of Estonia
- Headquarters: Tallinn, Estonia
- Agency executive: Madis Võõras, Sectoral Manager (within Enterprise Estonia)
- Website: www.eis.ee/space/

Space Estonia (Estonian: Eesti Kosmosebüroo) is the unit established within Enterprise Estonia by the Government of Estonia to facilitate membership in the European Space Agency and related commercial and research ties. In addition Space Estonia serves as a contact point with the IAF, European Association for the International Space Year (EURISY) and EUMETSAT in procurement-related matters.

Space Estonia is not a space agency. State space policy as it exists is managed through the Space Affairs Council at the Ministry of Economic Affairs and Communications. Space Estonia functions as a centre for technology and business competence alongside Tartu Observatory which has responsibility for space science, space exploration and remote sensing. Various activities within the Framework Programmes for Research and Technological Development of the European Union for education, science and innovation, including funding for space programs, are coordinated by the Archimedes Foundation.

Since 2010, the Riigikogu has had a 'Space Studies Support Group' (Kosmose valdkonna toetusrühm) currently chaired by Andrei Korobeinik.

== See also ==
- Space science in Estonia
- Ene Ergma - Skytte medal recipient
- ESTCube-1 - first Estonian satellite
- ESTCube-2 - Estonian satellite
