= ESTCube-1 =

Estonian nanosatellite

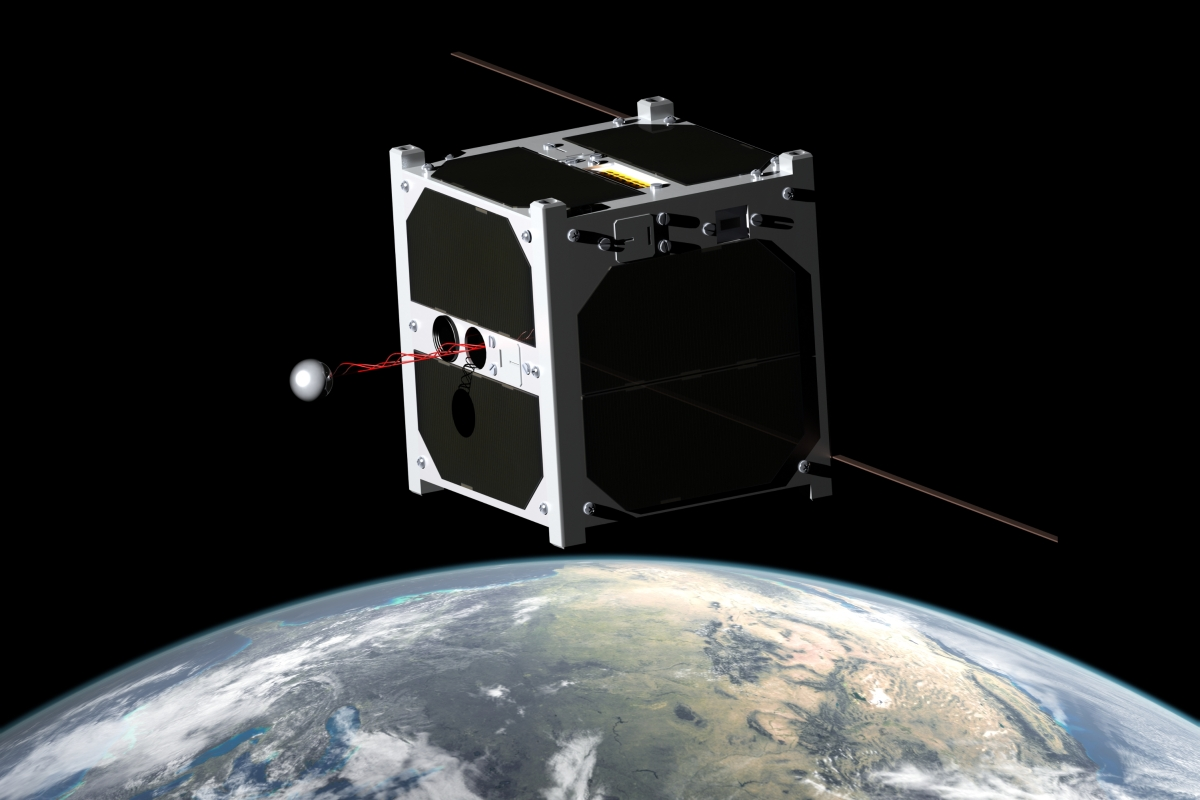
- ESTCube-1 illustration
- Mission type: Technology
- Operator: University of Tartu
- COSPAR ID: 2013-021C
- SATCAT no.: 39161
- Website: http://www.estcube.eu/en/home
- Mission duration: Planned: 12 months Final: 1 year, 9 months, 10 days

Spacecraft properties
- Launch mass: 1.048 kilograms (2.31 lb)
- Dry mass: 1.048 kilograms (2.31 lb)
- Power: 3.6 W

Start of mission
- Launch date: 7 May 2013, 02:06:31 UTC
- Rocket: Vega flight VV02
- Launch site: Kourou ELA-1
- Contractor: ESA

End of mission
- Deactivated: 17 Feb 2015, 10:27:00 UTC
- Last contact: 19 May 2015
- Decay date: 2038*estimated

Orbital parameters
- Reference system: Geocentric
- Regime: Low Earth
- Perigee altitude: 665 km
- Apogee altitude: 665 km
- Inclination: 98.129 degrees
- Period: 98.03 minutes

ESTCube-1 is the first Estonian satellite and first satellite in the world to attempt to use an electric solar wind sail (E-sail). It was launched on 7 May, 2013, aboard Vega VV02 carrier rocket and successfully deployed into the orbit. The CubeSat standard for nanosatellites was followed during the engineering of ESTCube-1, resulting in a 10×10×11.35 cm cube, with a volume of 1 liter and a mass of 1.048 kg.

The mission officially ended on 17 February, 2015. At that time, data from the satellite was used in 29 bachelor's and 19 master's dissertations, 5 doctoral theses, and 4 start-ups. The deployment of the E-sail tether was unsuccessful, and thus no measurements were taken of the E-sail or of the plasma braking deployment system. The last signal from ESTCube-1 was received on 19 May, 2015.

== Scientific purpose ==
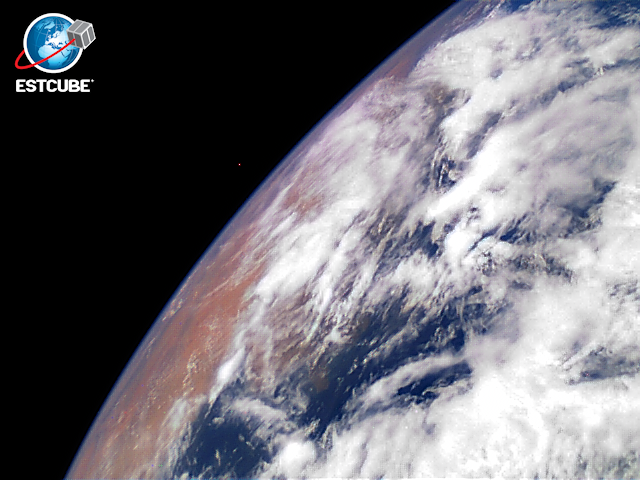
The first image of Earth taken by ESTCube-1 on May 15, 2013

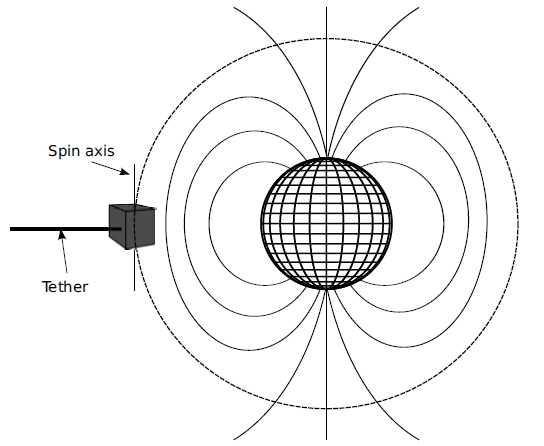
ESTCube-1 E-sail experiment

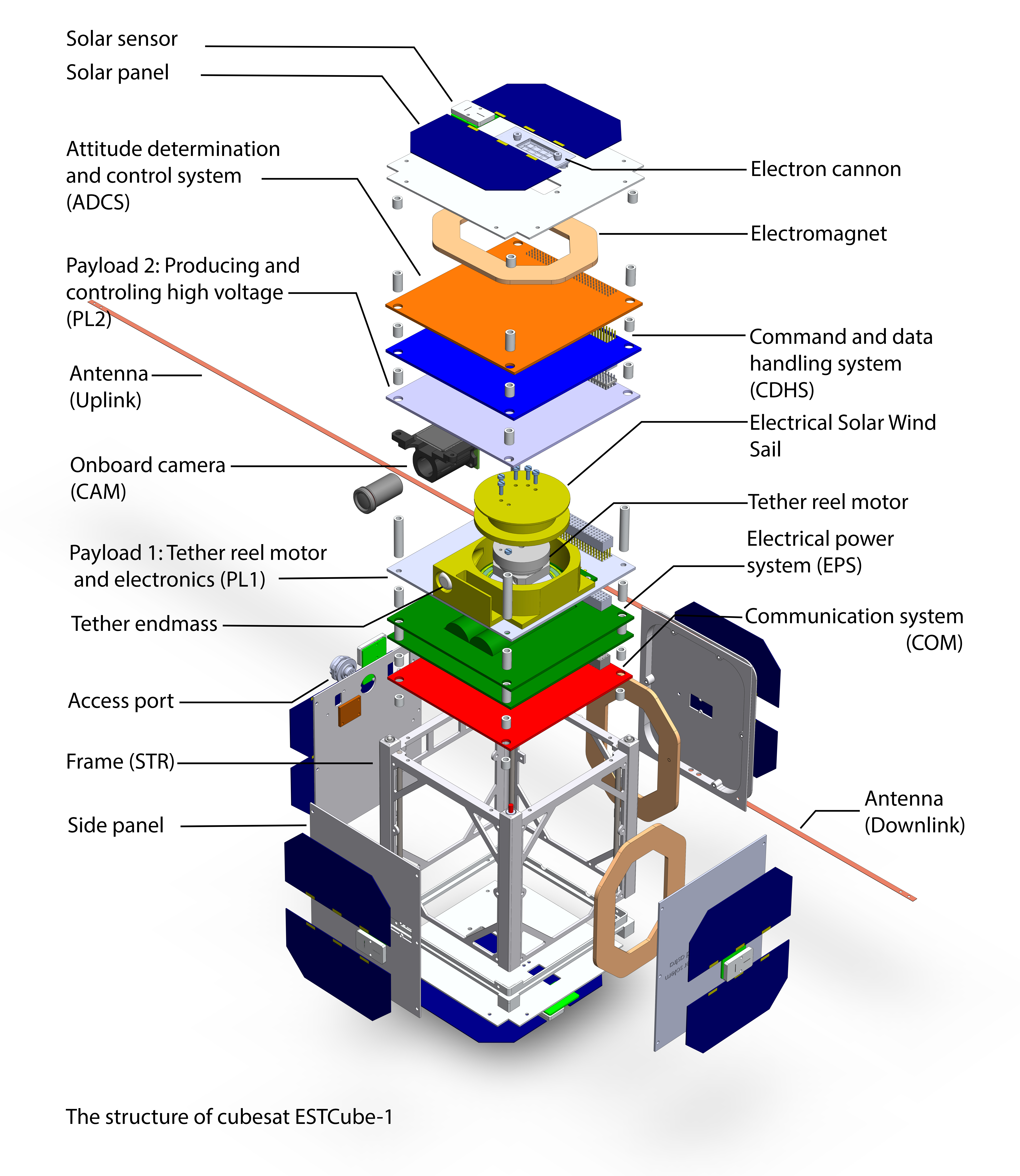
The structure illustration of cubesat ESTCube-1

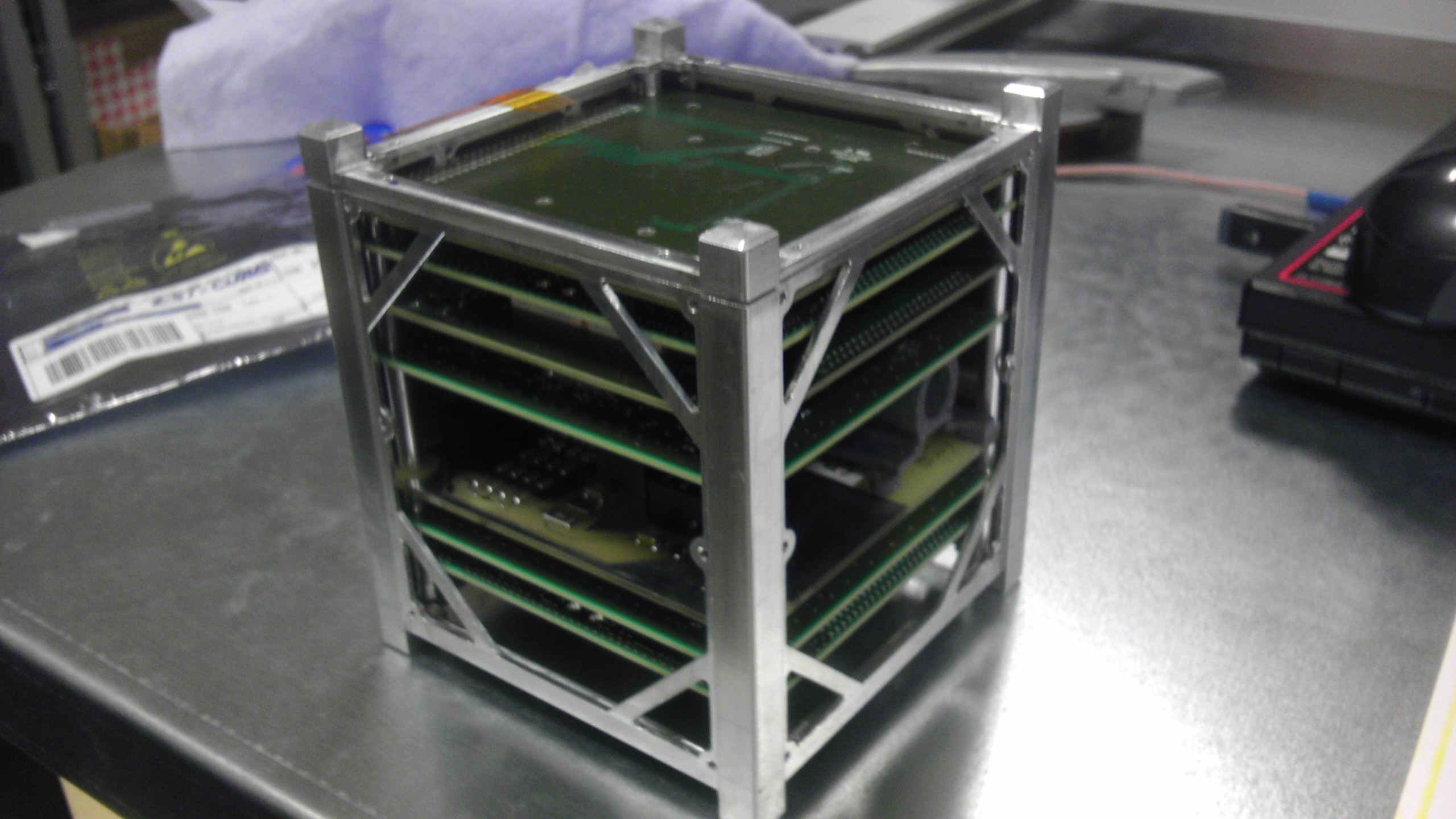
ESTCube-1 structure

Developed as part of the Estonian Student Satellite Program, ESTCube-1 was an educational project in which university and high school students participated.

While emphasis was placed on educating students during creation of ESTCube-1, it did have a scientific purpose. The satellite carried an electric solar wind sail (E-sail), which was invented by Finnish scientist, Pekka Janhunen. During the ESTCube-1 flight, 10 meters of 20–50 micrometer thick E-sail wire, sometimes referred to as "Heytether," were to be deployed from the satellite. The deployment of the Heytether was to be detected by a decrease of the satellite's rotation speed or an on board camera.

To control the E-sail element's interaction with both the plasma surrounding the Earth and the effect it had on the spacecraft's spinning speed, two nanotechnology electron emitters/guns were on board. The electron emitters were connected to the E-sail element which was to be charged positively to 500 volts by shooting out electrons. The positive ions in the plasma were intended to push the E-sail element and influence the satellite's rotation speed. The effect of the plasma on the E-sail was to be measured by the change in said rotation speed. The tether had also been intended to de-orbit the satellite by use as a plasma-brake to demonstrate a possibility for returning small satellites from orbit. A color CMOS camera was also on board that was capable of making RAW-format pictures with VGA-resolution. This camera was used to acquire images of Earth and had been intended to monitor deployment of the Heytether.

== Orbit ==
To complete the scientific experiment and communicate with the satellite on several occasions the orbit chosen was a Sun–synchronous circular orbit at an altitude of 670 kilometers. ESTCube-1 was launched into orbit by Arianespace, using Vega VV02 rocket which lifted off from ELA-1 at Kourou at 02:06:31 UTC on 7 May 2013. The satellite was placed into orbit and communication successfully established, with the first photo of the Earth taken on May 15, and transmitted to the ground on the amateur radio band.

== Lifespan of the satellite ==
The plan, beginning with the 7 May 2013 launch, included the following steps:

- Half an hour after the satellite's deployment from the start capsule, the satellite's antennas were deployed and radio transmitter and important subsystems were switched on.
- During first 48 hours after the deployment, the satellite sent only safe-mode CW beacon signals.
- The first weeks were used to test the satellite and set it to work at full capacity.
- Orientation of the satellite so the on-board camera was facing Earth to acquire images of Estonia. That goal was achieved during the project.
- Rotation of the satellite on its longitudinal axis with a speed of 1 revolution per second. ESTCube-1 became possibly the fastest controlled rotating satellite in history, reaching angular velocity 841 °/sec.
- E-Sail element deployment from the satellite by centrifugal force was attempted in mid-October 2014, however, the deployment failed, possibly due to a stuck reel. No confirmation of the deployment was received via the on-board camera, and further E-sail experiments were not conducted.
- After the failure of E-Sail tether deployment, on-board cold cathode electron emitters were successfully tested.

=== End of mission ===
The mission ended due to degradation of the photovoltaic power system and subsequently the batteries became exhausted. The last official transmission was transmitted on 17 February, 2015, however, imaging the Earth and gathering telemetry data continued till May 19, 2015. The plan to test a solar sail the satellite carried failed since the sail cable unwinding mechanics did not survive the rocket takeoff vibration.

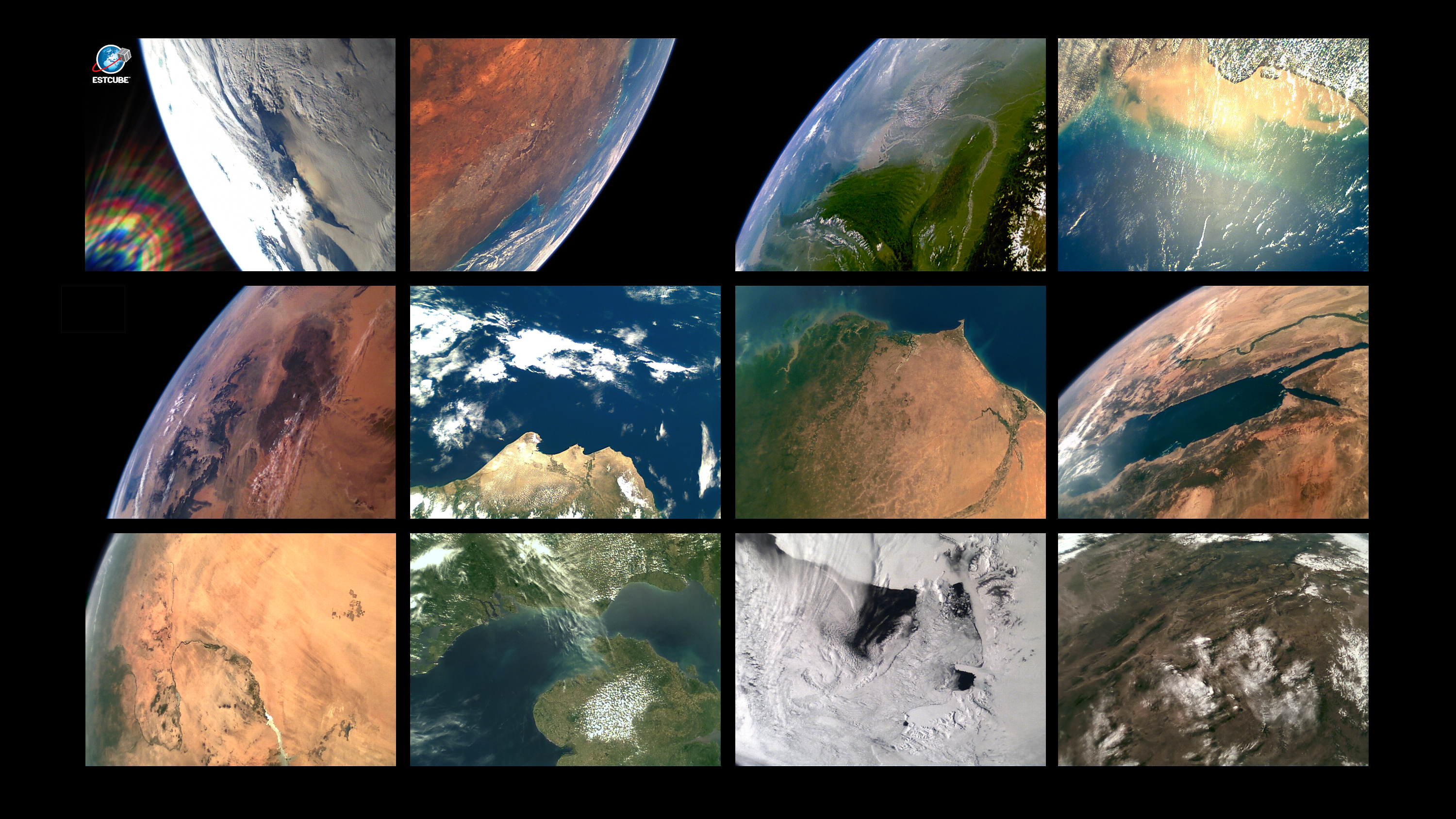
Photos taken by ESTCube-1 (in chronological order). Point at or click on each photo to see where it is.

== Design ==
=== Measurements and weight ===
During the development of the Estonian satellite mission it was decided to make a 1U CubeSat. By standard 1 unit (1U) CubeSat base side length must be 100.0±0.1 millimeters and satellite height must be 113.5±0.1 mm. Mass is also set in CubeSat standard, the highest possible mass for 1U CubeSat is 1300 grams.

=== Communications ===
Communication from the satellite was made at two International Amateur Radio Unions registered frequencies

- 437.250 MHz
- 437.505 MHz

Periodic but very slow communication was made by using 18 WPM telegraphy signal on a frequency of 437.250 MHz. At that frequency, the most important satellite parameters are returned every 3 to 10 minutes. For fast connections FSK-modulation radio signals on a frequency of 437.505 MHz with a 9600 baud connection speed and AX.25 packet standard is used. The relatively slow connection speeds result from the use of amateur radio frequencies which limits the bandwidth to 25 kilohertz. The fast connection is used only when the satellite has been given a specific order. Both telegraphy and packet telemetry protocols of ESTCube-1 are published on project webpage.

Commands sent to the satellite used the 145 MHz (2 meter) amateur band.

=== Software ===
ESTCube-1 microcontrollers used the following operating systems:

- FreeRTOS on the satellite's Command and Data Handling System and camera module.
- TinyOS on the satellite's communication module. (Typically used with devices running on low power)

Mission Control System was developed by the students of Tartu University under the supervision of the company CGI Group.

The microcontrollers operating systems and the Mission Control System software ‘Hummingbird’ are open-source.

== Financing and costs ==
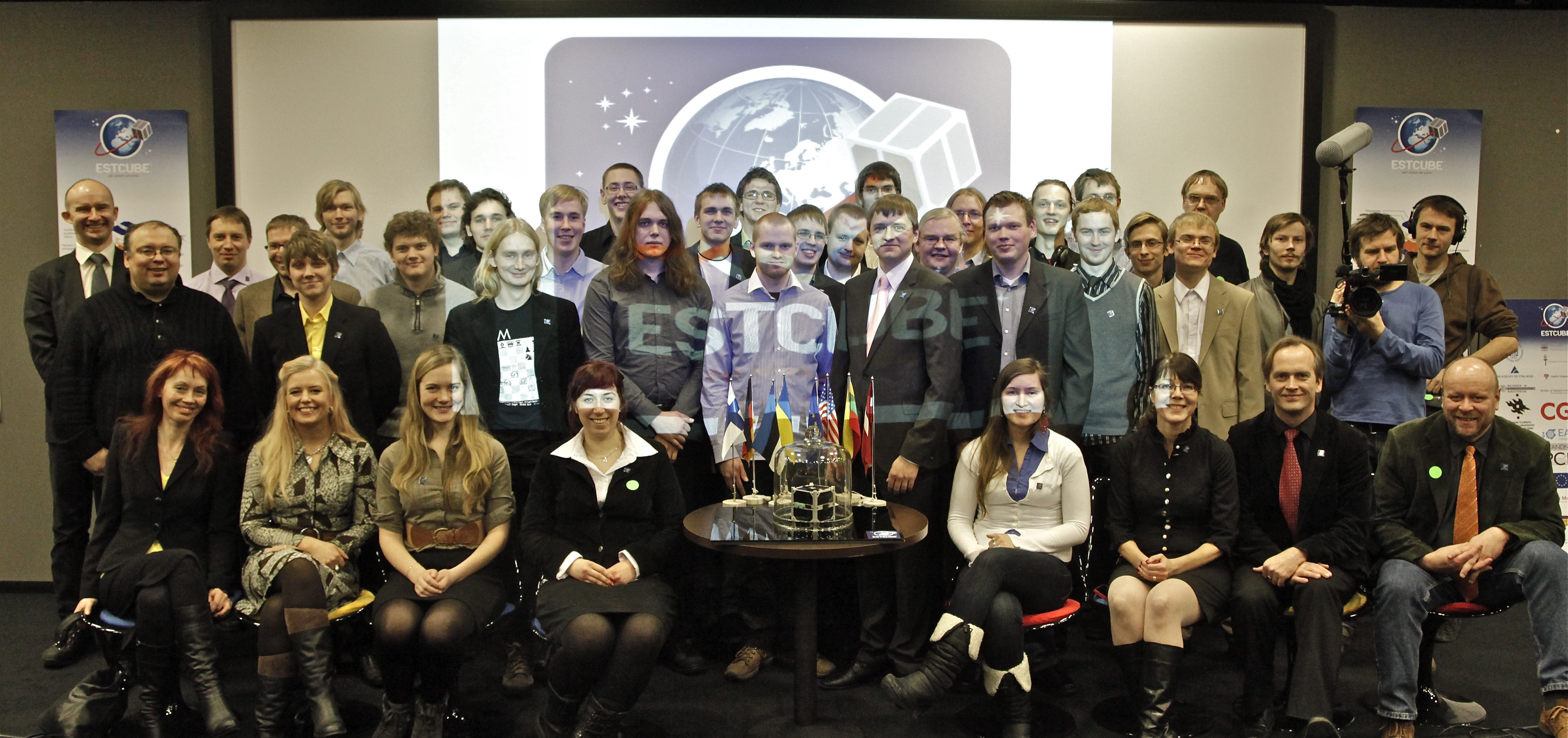
ESTCube-1 presentation in January 2013

ESTCube-1 was launched as a secondary payload onboard Vega flight VV02, the least expensive satellite launch offered by the European Space Agency. Because Estonia is an associated member of ESA, most of the launch expenses (about 70,000 euros) were covered by the Estonian member fee for educational expenses. With the launch, total expenses for the project were approximately 100,000 euros.

== Results ==
During its two-year operational life, ESTCube-1 satellite demonstrated the operation of the systems in space and successfully fulfilled most of its planned goals.

- Radio beacon of the satellite was received couple of hours after the launch, two-way communication was established couple of days later.
- From that moment on, ESTCube-1 subsystems received many firmware updates for electrical power system, on-board computer and camera micro-controllers.
- The on-board camera was proven to be of high quality and provided 230 high-quality images of Earth, also fulfilling the goal of getting pictures of Estonia. Successors of the camera system are flown on European Student Earth Orbiter satellite and commercialized by the company CrystalSpace.
- ESTCube-1 mission engaged considerable number of amateur radio operators over the world, invention of so-called SIDS protocol for distributed groundstation networks is a globally wide-spread method for relaying small satellite data to their operators.
- ESTCube did succeed in creating a more commercially available price of a satellite.
- Successful spin-up the satellite to high angular rate around a specified axis using only magnetic coils.
- The deployment of the E-sail was unsuccessful, and no measurements were taken of the E-sail or of the plasma braking deployment system. A novel cold cathode electron emitter was tested successfully.

== See also ==
- ESTCube-2
- Aalto-1 – Finnish Aalto university nanosatellite project
- CubeSat
- List of CubeSats
- Space science in Estonia
