= Astronaut for a Day =

Portuguese STEM initiative

Astronaut for a Day, an initiative launched by the Portuguese Space Agency in 2022,provides young students in the Portuguese education system with the chance to experience a zero-gravity flight and the same sensations astronauts have in space.

Inspired by the astronaut selection processes of renowned space agencies, this national competition is not for the faint-hearted. It involves a rigorous selection process designed for students aged 14–18. The evaluation process, which includes five elimination phases, tests candidates' creativity, communication skills, and logical, spatial, and physical abilities. Finalists selected for the last phase participate in a parabolic flight aboard an Airbus A310 operated by Novespace.

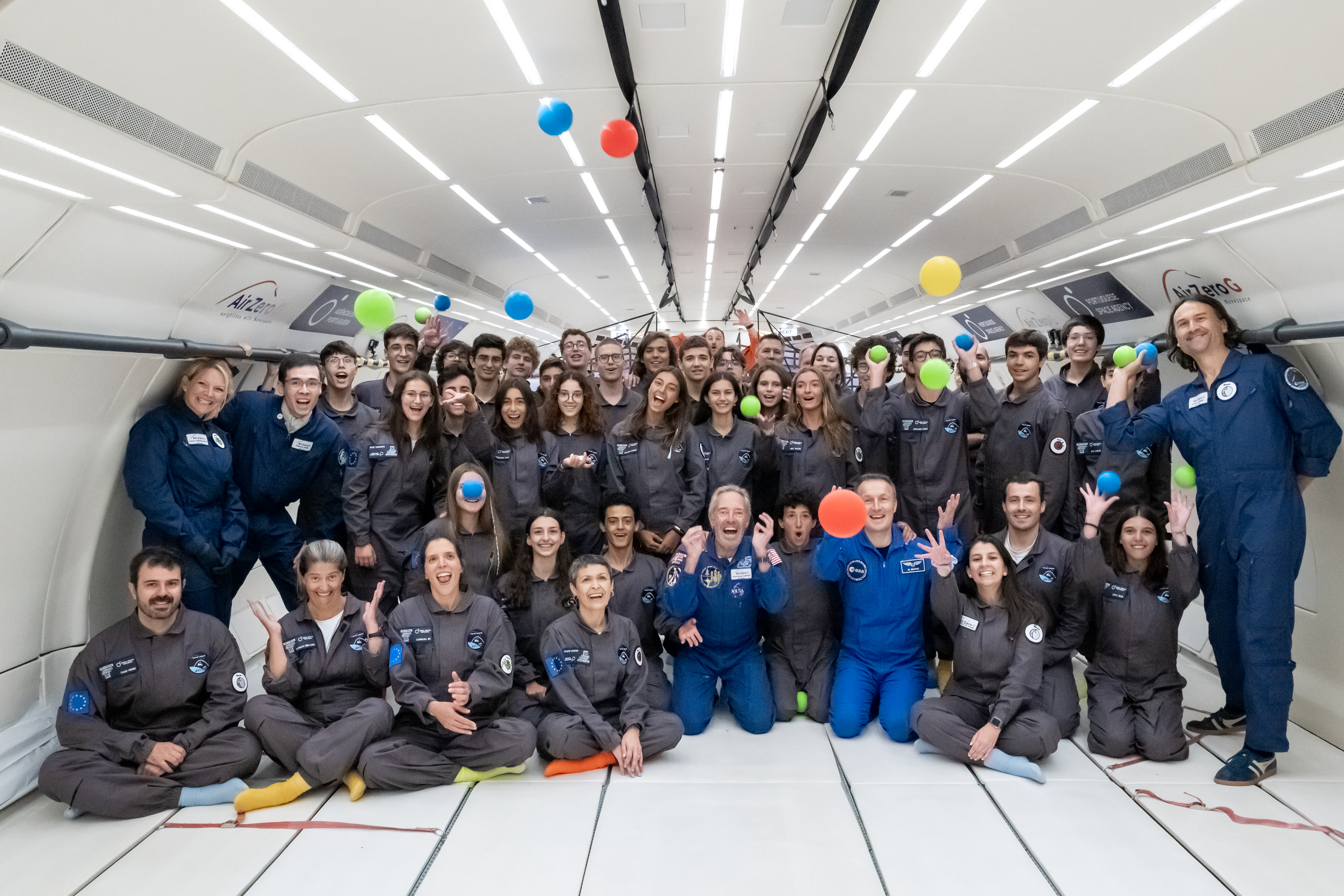
The finalists of the Class of 2023, the second edition of the Portuguese Astronaut for a Day with the Novespace team and European Space Agency astronaut Matthias Maurer

In the first three editions of Astronaut for a Day (2022, 2023, and 2024), the Portuguese Space Agency received over 1,600 applications nationwide. This initiative is considered a significant success and plays a key role in the Agency's strategy of fostering interest in STEM fields, particularly in space studies and careers among younger generations. So far, Portugal has 91 "astronauts".

After the flight, each finalist becomes an ambassador for the initiative. They represent the Portuguese Space Agency and promote the activity within their school communities throughout the following academic year. This ambassadorship helps develop their leadership skills and raises awareness of space exploration among their peers.

The Portuguese Space Agency organises the Astronaut for a Day initiative in collaboration with Ciência Viva, the Faculty of Psychology and Educational Sciences of the University of Porto, and the Faculty of Human Kinetics of the University of Lisbon, which develop and oversee the tests during the various elimination phases. The final phase occurs at Beja Air Base, in partnership with the Portuguese Air Force, which hosts the Airbus A310 and the finalists for a series of preparatory activities.

In the first two years, the activities offered to students during the final phase included a lecture by European Space Agency (ESA) astronaut Matthias Maurer.

Astronaut for a Day is an original initiative of the Portuguese Space Agency, marking the first time that young students have been offered the opportunity to experience a zero-gravity flight. Beyond its success within the Portuguese community, the Space Agencies of Luxembourg and Estonia have already replicated the initiative.

International editions

Other national space organisations have adopted the Astronaut for a Day concept outside Portugal. In Luxembourg, the Luxembourg Space Agency (LSA) launched a national "Astronaut for a Day" competition in 2023 as part of its fifth-anniversary celebrations, in collaboration with the Ministries of the Economy, Education, Children and Youth, and Sport. The contest, open to students aged 13–18 enrolled in Luxembourgish schools, received 221 applications, from which 35 winners were selected as “space ambassadors”. In September 2023, these young people took part in the first zero-gravity flight to depart from Luxembourg Airport, flying parabolic manoeuvres aboard a Novespace aircraft and experiencing short periods of weightlessness.
