= European Space Resources Innovation Centre =

Competence center in Luxembourg

The European Space Resources Innovation Centre (ESRIC) is a European center of excellence for scientific, technical, commercial and economic aspects related to the exploitation of space resources, established in 2020. ESRIC is funded and supported by the Luxembourg Space Agency (LSA), managed and hosted by the Luxembourg Institute of Science and Technology (LIST) as its own facility for the time being, and the European Space Agency (ESA) provides facilities, implements research activities at ESRIC, and provides technical and commercial support.

== History ==
ESRIC builds on the SpaceResources.lu initiative created in 2016, which aims at the peaceful and sustainable establishment and development of activities related to the exploration and exploitation of space resources by humans and robots. On November 11, 2016, the Luxembourg government introduced a law to regulate property rights in space. With the Law on the Exploration and Use of Space Resources (in short: Space Resources Law), the Grand Duchy of Luxembourg was the first European country to regulate mining in space with a national law. The Space Resources Act went into effect on August 1, 2017. In 2018 the Luxembourg Space Agency was founded.

ESRIC was created on November 18, 2020, as a center for research and development related to space resources by the Luxembourg Space Agency, the Luxembourg Institute of Science and Technology, and the European Space Agency.

== Aim and purpose ==
ESRIC is dedicated, in addition to research and development, to promoting commercial initiatives and start-ups for the development, exploration and exploitation of space resources, e.g. through the transfer of knowledge.

== Directors ==
- 2020–2022: Matthias Link
- since 2022: Kathryn Hadler

== See also ==
- Luxembourg Space Agency
- European Space Agency
- Asteroid mining
