= Plus Pool =

Floating pool initiative in New York City

- Commercial?: No
- Type of project: Public swimming pool
- Location: East River, New York City
- Founder: Dong-Ping Wong, Oana Stănescu, Archie Lee Coates IV, Jeffrey Franklin
- Established: June 2010
- Launched: 2025; Manhattan - Lower East Side - Pier 35
- Funding: New York State, Crowdfunded via Kickstarter
- Website: www.pluspool.org/home/

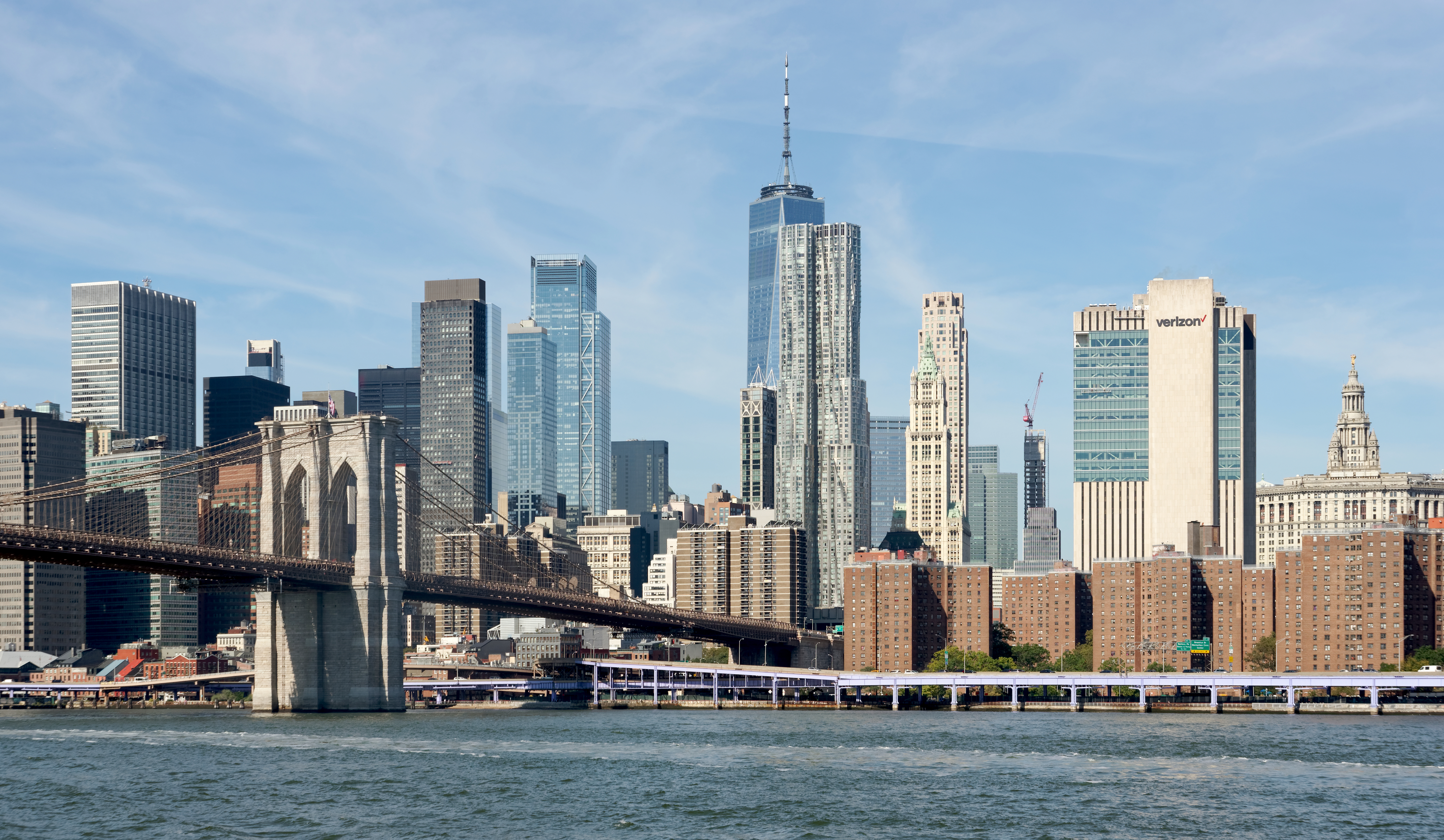
Pier 35 on the East River in Lower Manhattan is the planned location for the first Plus Pool in 2025.

Plus Pool (often stylized as "+ POOL") is an initiative started in 2010 to create an innovative, floating swimming pool on the East River in New York City. Architect Dong-Ping Wong developed the concept of a floating pool that would filter river water to supply clean water for the pool. The pool is planned to be located at Pier 35 on the Lower East Side of Manhattan.

== Concept ==
Plus Pool was designed to clean the waters of the East River and provide a public space for water-based recreation. The pool's name comes from the fact that it would be shaped like a plus sign. The original design called for four separate pools (lounge, kids', watersports, and lap-swimming pools) that combine to create a 9,000 square feet (840 m^{2}) pool with several lap lanes.

Prior to Plus Pool, New York City has had many 'floating baths' moored along the Hudson and East Rivers. A floating pool known as the 'Floating Pool Lady' was created at Brooklyn Bridge Park in 2007 and continues to operate in Barretto Point Park in the Bronx.

Plus Pool was designed to filter up to one million gallons of river water daily directly from the East River through its unique custom, chemical-free, layered filtration system. Over 250,000 gallons of the river water surrounding the pool will become safe, clean, filtered water used to fill the pool. The pool was designed to contain 285,500 U.S. gallons (1,081,000 L; 237,700 imp gal) of water and to filter from 600,000 U.S. gallons (2,300,000 L; 500,000 imp gal) up to 1,000,000 U.S. gallons (3,800,000 L; 830,000 imp gal) per day.

== History ==
=== 2010 to 2013 ===
In 2010, Dong-Ping Wong of Family New York (now known as Food New York) designed a plus-shaped floating pool with the idea that it could filter river water through its walls. He asked Jeffrey Franklin and Archie Lee Coates IV of PlayLab to initially help create a website and booklet to raise support for the project and soon the three decided to be co-founders. Family New York led the strategy, architecture, and engineering while PlayLab led the branding and communication. In 2011, the two companies began a crowdfunding campaign on Kickstarter to raise money for Plus Pool, an innovative pool design, utilizing a custom filtering system as a clean water source for a floating pool on the East River.

In July 2011, the team raised over $41,000 on Kickstarter to test filtration materials using water from the East River. Originally, the goal was to raise $15 million to fund a completely functioning pool by 2016.

=== 2013–present ===
In July 2013, with the help of a feasibility study by Columbia University, over a quarter million dollars was raised to build a 35-square-foot (3.3 m^{2}) miniature version of the floating pool. The "test lab" was a working prototype to analyze its effectiveness in river conditions. Since its inception, several independent companies have participated in the project, including the engineering firm, Arup, design firm IDEO, environmental consultants from One Nature, and Storefront for Art and Architecture. The project also garnered interest from government officials, notably New York State Senator Daniel Squadron and New York City Council Member Brad Lander. In November 2013, Time magazine named Plus Pool one of the 25 best inventions of the year 2013.

In 2015, a nonprofit organization known as Friends of +Pool was created to oversee the pool's development. Plus Pool was originally projected to open by the summer of 2016, but the project saw little development then.

In 2017, Plus Pool formed a partnership with the Heineken brewing company. The team created a promotional video for Plus Pool, narrated by Neil Patrick Harris, to revitalize public interest in the project. The pool's sponsors also applied for a provisional patent in 2017 and an international patent the next year.

In 2019, the founders of Plus Pool introduced a light sculpture in the East River. Funded by the National Endowment for the Arts, Heineken, and the Howard Hughes Corporation, the sculpture changes colors based on water conditions. The system and algorithm behind it were developed by scientists at Columbia University and developers and designers at the tech firm Reaktor.

In 2021, New York City approved a location for Plus Pool just north of the Manhattan Bridge on the Lower East Side. The team proceeded to work on regulatory thresholds for the river and pool bathers.

On January 5, 2024, New York Governor, Kathy Hochul announced that a joint effort by the state and New York City would fund a combined $16 million to the Plus Pool project as part of the governor's NY SWIMS initiative. Testing of the filtration system began in August 2024 on a barge at Pier 35.

In 2025, a 320 ton, rectangular version of the pool, about one-fourth of the full size pool began construction at Pier 35. The larger size pool was installed to complete the testing of the filtration system and obtain city and state permits. The intent is to have the rectangular pool up and running and open to the public in 2026. It will remain in operation until it is replaced by the full scale version.

Plus Pool suffered multiple delays and setbacks in 2026; in April, the pool's public opening was delayed because of health and safety concerns raised by the New York City Department of Health and Mental Hygiene. Also, in late July, after the test barge and its filtration system had been completed, it was aannounced that Plus Pool's opening would be postponed until 2027 due to ongoing flood protection work on the East River near the barge's proposed location.
