= Luxembourg Space Agency =

Space agency founded in 2018

Luxembourg Space Agency LSA

Agency overview
- Formed: 12 September 2018
- Jurisdiction: Government of Luxembourg
- Headquarters: Luxembourg City Luxembourg; 49°36′48.6″N 06°07′37″E
- Agency executive: Marc Serres, Chief executive officer
- Parent department: Luxembourg Ministry of Economy
- Website: space-agency.public.lu

The Luxembourg Space Agency (LSA) is the national space agency of the Grand Duchy of Luxembourg. It was founded on September 12, 2018, by Luxembourg's Economy Minister Étienne Schneider.

== Goal ==
The goal of the Luxembourg Space Agency is to use Luxembourg's state funds to provide private companies, start-ups and organizations in the field of space exploration with financial support, especially those working on asteroid mining. In a 2021 Financial Times interview, LSA CEO Marc Serres stated that “there was perhaps a little misconception about asteroid mining at the beginning,” and that the primary goal of the LSA is not asteroid mining, but rather In-Situ Resource Utilization (ISRU).

One of Luxembourg's key contributions to global space exploration is not probes or launch vehicles, but rather the legal framework and bureaucracy required to govern space activities, both by governments and private firms. As of 2023 there are approximately 70 private space companies, with a combined workforce of 1,400 individuals and accounting for 2% of Luxembourg's GDP, headquartered in Luxembourg due to its status as a corporate haven, with Luxembourg passing the first regulatory act for private spaceflight in the world in 2020. Unlike most other government run public space agencies, the LSA is modeled after a private firm, with a CEO instead of a director or president, and with the primary goal of the agency "to diversify our economy through space activities,” and turn a profit. In late 2023 LSA outlined a 4-year plan to double the space industry's contribution to the Luxembourger GDP from 2% to 4% by 2027.

== History ==
=== International cooperation ===
The LSA was one of the founding members of the Artemis Accords, a treaty of international cooperation led by the United States for its Artemis Program which will see international technology used to help send American, and international, astronauts to the moon.

At the 70th International Astronautical Congress on October 22, 2019, LSA and NASA signed a memorandum of understanding to work together to further cooperation in lunar exploration, with a particular emphasis on advancing commercial opportunities. Specifically, the memorandum focused on the LSA acting as a regulatory agency for the numerous private firms based in Luxembourg, to make sure that they were still following NASA guidelines for future Artemis missions.

=== ISRU specialization ===
In 2019 LSA signed a partnership with the European Space Agency (ESA) to promote and develop the research, economic and legal aspects of In-Situ Resource Utilization (ISRU) as a way to reduce costs for future space missions, by having spacecraft produce resources such as fuel in the field. The scope of the cooperation agreement will include research, private firm incubation, and specialization concentration.

Since 2020, Luxembourg has hosted the annual "Luxembourg Space Resources Week", a conference in conjunction with the European Space Resources Innovation Centre, open to any member of the ESA to discuss the development of ISRU programs and their implementation. At the third meeting in 2023 LSA announced the "Lunar Space Resources Accelerator", a fund for private start-up companies to begin developing ISRU programs in Luxembourg.

In April 2023, LSA and a private firm, OffWorld Europe, announced a partnership to develop an ISRU process to extract, process, store and use water collected from the surface of the moon in the form of ice. The project, which is under the oversight of the ESA, will use OffWorld's technical expertise in robotics with a technology demonstration mission slated for launch to the moon in 2027 on SpaceX's Starship HLS.

=== Cellular services ===
Luxembourg subsidizes the use of Luxembourger companies to act as mission control centers for various European cellular services and satellites, developing controls for large satellite constellations in partnership with the LSA and ESA.

In 2022 the LSA funded the MACSAT mission, a technology demonstration satellite launched on board a Vega rideshare designed, produced, and run by a private firm, OQ Technology, to demonstrate global satellite 5G.

=== Astronaut for a Day ===
In 2023, the LSA launched a national Astronaut for a Day competition, inspired by the Portuguese Space Agency, as part of its fifth-anniversary celebrations, in collaboration with the Ministries of the Economy, Education, Children and Youth, and Sport. The contest, open to students aged 13–18 enrolled in Luxembourgish schools, received 221 applications, from which 35 winners were selected as “space ambassadors”. In September 2023, these young people took part in the first zero-gravity flight to depart from Luxembourg Airport, flying parabolic manoeuvres aboard a Novespace aircraft and experiencing short periods of weightlessness.

== See also ==
- Space colonization
- Space law
