= ESTCube-2 =

Estonian nanosatellite

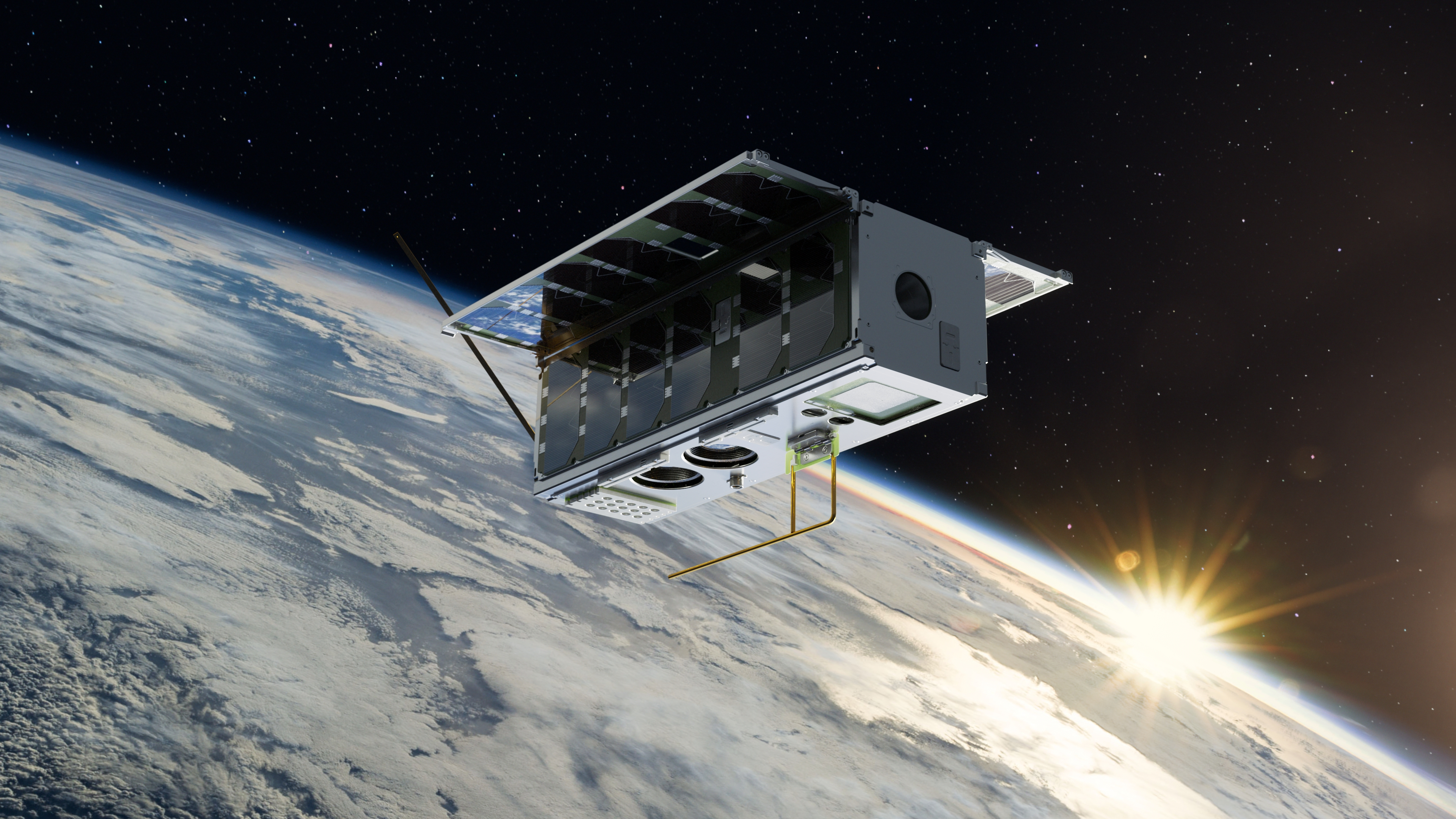
- ESTCube-2 artist impression by Frost FX, ESTCube, Karl Vilhelm Valter
- Mission type: Educational Cubesat
- COSPAR ID: 2023-155A
- SATCAT no.: 58016

Spacecraft properties
- Manufacturer: Estonian Student Satellite Foundation

Start of mission
- Launch date: 9 October 2023 01:36 UTC
- Rocket: Vega (VV23)
- Launch site: Guiana Space Centre ELV
- Contractor: Arianespace

End of mission
- Destroyed: 9 October 2023 (re-entry due to failure to deploy)

Orbital parameters
- Altitude: 564 km

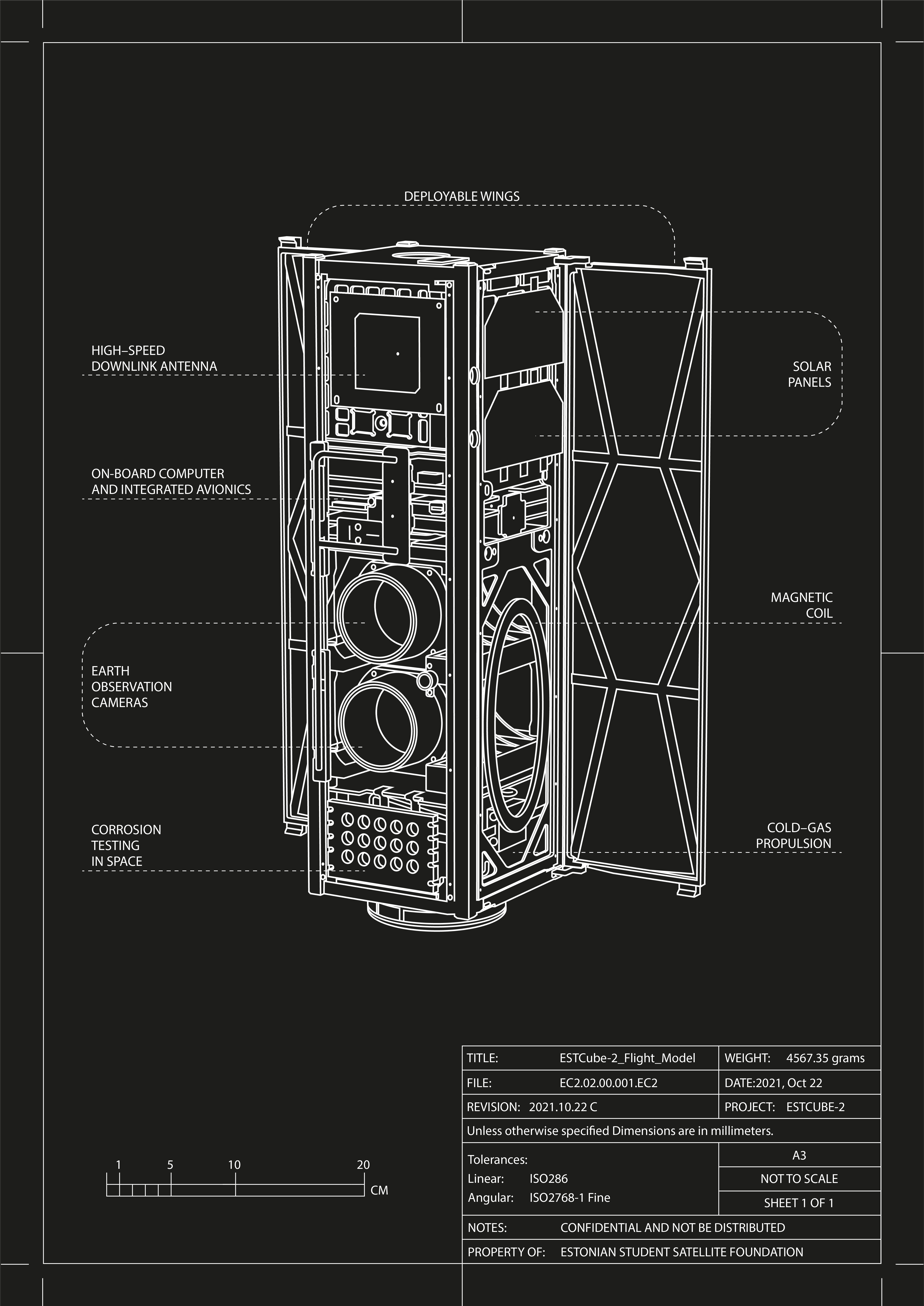
ESTCube-2 technical drawing. Illustration by Rute Marta Jansone, Anna Maskava

ESTCube-2 was a three-unit (1 U standard dimension 100x100x113.5 mm) CubeSat built by the Estonian Student Satellite Foundation. ESTCube-2 launched from Kourou, French Guiana, with the European Space Agency's Vega launch vehicle on 9 October 2023 at 4:36 a.m. EEST. The satellite likely failed to deploy and was likely destroyed when the upper stage of the launch vehicle reentered the atmosphere.

ESTCube-2 was the second satellite in the ESTCube program (the first was ESTCube-1). The satellite was completed in the first half of 2022. The development of the satellite started in January 2014, but the necessary team and funding were not obtained until 2016. ESTCube-2, like ESTCube-1, was an educational-scientific project that aimed to give university and high school students the opportunity to participate in the creation and completion of a space mission. Dozens of diploma theses were involved in the construction and development of the satellite.

The planned altitude of the ESTCube-2 orbit was 564 kilometers from the ground and the expected speed of the satellite in orbit was about 7.6 km/s.

Partners are the University of Tartu, Tartu Observatory, Finnish Meteorological Institute, GomSpace, Milrem Robotics, Foresail, Dresden University of Technology, Captain Corrosion, European Space Agency, European Commission

== Launch ==
ESTCube-2 launched on 9 October 2023 at 4:36 a.m. EEST, aboard the Vega rocket from the European Spaceport in Kourou, French Guiana. The launch was planned for 5 October 2023, but was delayed. As of 9 October 2023, communication to the satellite has not been established yet. Arianespace confirmed via email to the ESTCube-2 team that the satellite had failed to deploy and likely remained attached to the launch vehicle when it was deorbited and burned up on re-entry.

== Satellite orbit ==
The launch of ESTCube-2 was on 9 October 2023, aboard the Vega rocket from the European Spaceport in Kourou, French Guiana. From this launch vehicle, the ESTCube-2 satellite would have been launched at an altitude of 564 km in Sun synchronous orbit. According to Marja-Liisa Plats, the head of communications at Tartu University, ESTCube-2 would have orbited the Earth 14 times a day (approx. every 103 minutes), and 8-10 of these orbits would have gone over Estonia. During these orbits over Estonia, communication from Tartu University to the satellite and signal to the satellite would have been possible for around 7 minutes.

== Scientific purpose ==
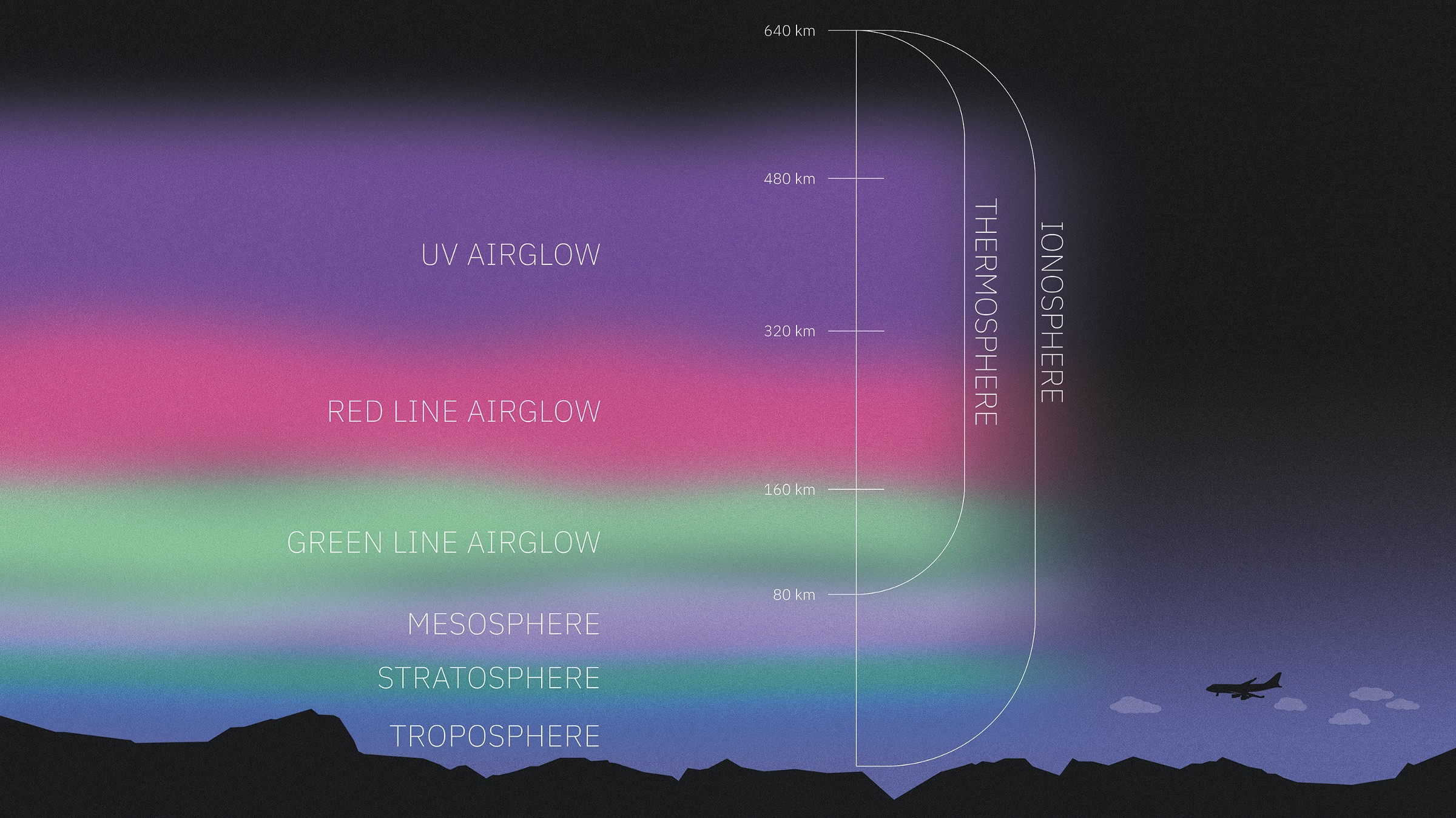
Ionosphere layers of the Earth atmosphere. Illustrated by Rute Marta Jansone

The primary goal of the ESTCube-2 project was to provide practical training in the development of space technology for undergraduate and high school students. This means that satellite design, prototyping, flight model assembly, testing and operating the satellite are the responsibility of students. To facilitate students' work, an open-source tech stack comprising nearly 20 software applications was used.

However, ESTCube-2 was more special than traditional university CubeSat missions because it was testing innovative technologies and solutions in space. The main purpose of the ESTCube-2 satellite's mission was to test the plasma brake, which would reduce the satellite's orbit and burn it up in the Earth's atmosphere at the end of the satellite's mission. The inventor of the plasma brake is Pekka Janhunen, a researcher at the Finnish Meteorological Institute. This technology is intended to help combat an increasingly pressing problem in near-Earth orbit - space debris, i.e. the accumulation of dead satellites and their parts in orbit. Removing non-functional satellites from orbit would reduce the likelihood of a collision between a functioning satellite and unusable space debris.

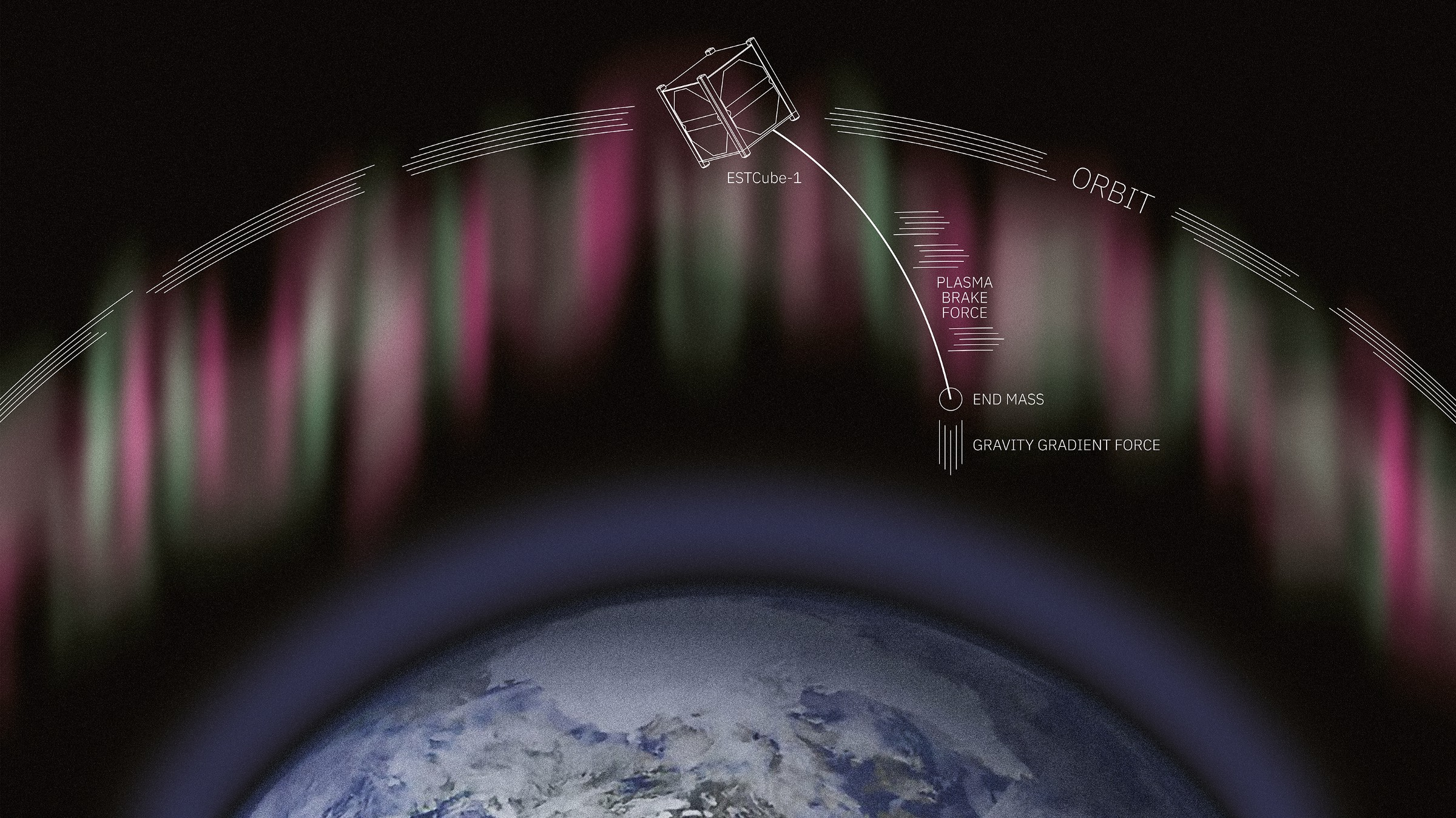
The tether is negatively charged and continuously interacts with the ionospheric plasma. Illustrated by Rute Marta Jansone

A total of four innovative technologies were intended for testing on board the ESTCube-2:

- Testing of plasma brake technology in the Earth's ionosphere to remove the satellite from orbit at the end of its mission.
- Advanced testing of integrated satellite on-board systems and bus. This includes, in addition to conventional systems, a miniature star tracker, flywheels, a cold gas thrust module, and a radio experiment to determine the satellite's position.
- Testing of two Earth observation cameras developed at Tartu Observatory. The cameras operate at two different wavelengths and are designed to measure the NDVI vegetation index on Earth.
- The satellite is testing thin film anti-corrosion materials that are developed by Captain Corrosion (Maido Merisalu, a researcher at the University of Tartu).

== Financing ==
The total estimated cost of ESTCube-2 was €250,000 ($264,000 USD). The satellite was launched in the framework of the European Commission's In-Orbit demonstration / Validation program.

ESTCube-2 was funded by donors and the Tartu Observatory of the University of Tartu. Entrepreneur Ahti Heinla supported the launch of the ESTCube-2 project with a significant contribution. More than 400 supporters donated €38,753 for the development of ESTCube-2 as part of a campaign run on the co-funding platform Hooandja.

== See also ==
- ESTCube-1
