= Aalto-1 =

Finnish research nanosatellite

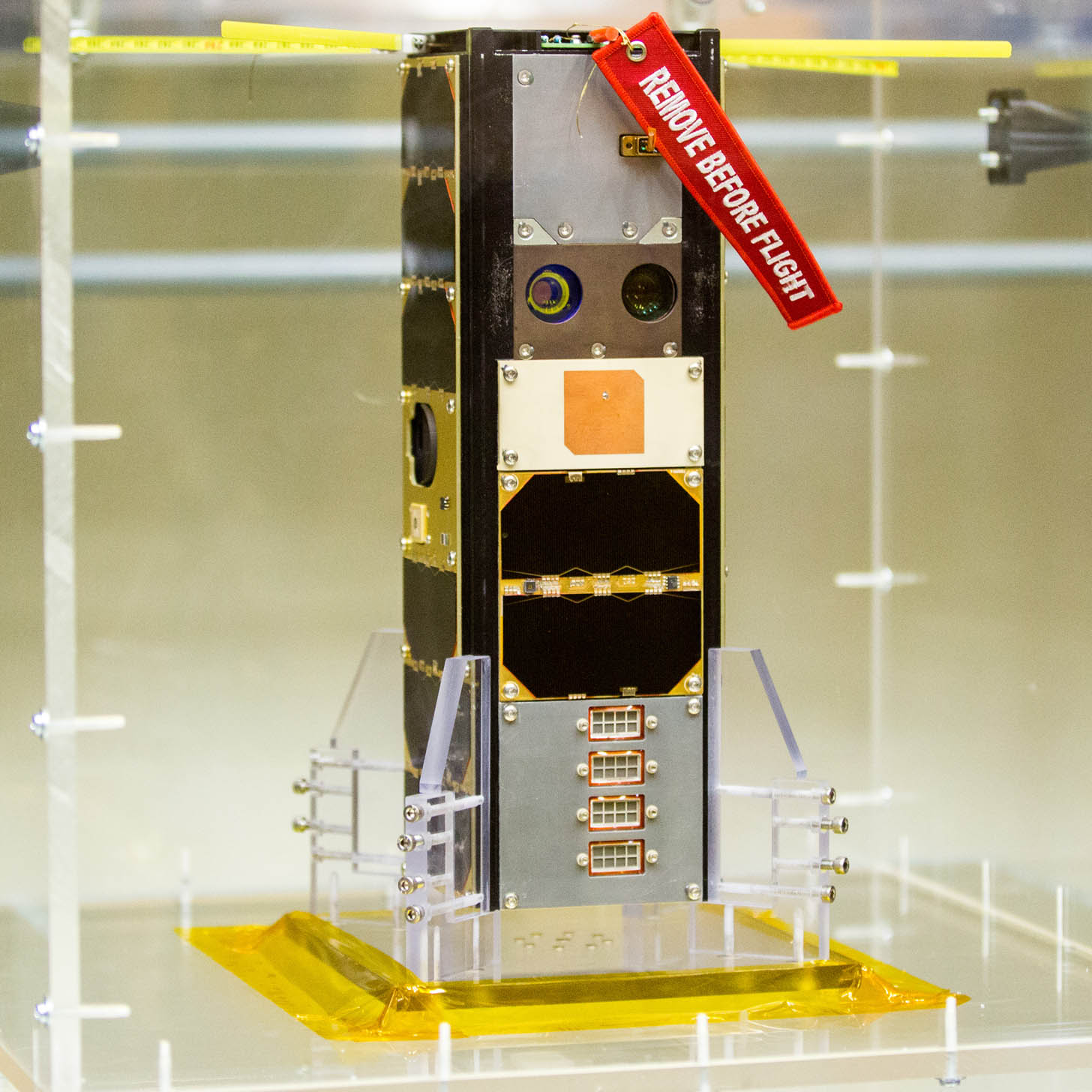
- Aalto-1 flight model in March 2016.
- Mission type: Technology demonstration
- Operator: Aalto University
- COSPAR ID: 2017-036L
- SATCAT no.: 42775
- Website: wiki.aalto.fi/display/SuomiSAT/Aalto-1+nanosatellite+project
- Mission duration: 2 years (planned); 7 years, 2 months and 9 days (final)

Spacecraft properties
- Spacecraft type: CubeSat
- Bus: 3U CubeSat
- Manufacturer: Aalto University
- Launch mass: 4 kg (8.8 lb)
- Dimensions: 10 × 10 × 34 cm (3.9 × 3.9 × 13.4 in)
- Power: 4.8 watts

Start of mission
- Launch date: 23 June 2017, 03:59 UTC
- Rocket: Polar Satellite Launch Vehicle (PSLV-C38)
- Launch site: Satish Dhawan Space Centre, First Launch Pad (FLP)
- Contractor: Indian Space Research Organisation
- Entered service: 24 July 2017 (first image)

End of mission
- Decay date: 1 September 2024

Orbital parameters
- Reference system: Geocentric orbit
- Regime: Low Earth orbit
- Perigee altitude: 505 km (314 mi)
- Apogee altitude: 505 km (314 mi)
- Inclination: 97.44°
- Period: 90.0 minutes

Instruments
- Imaging Fabry-Pérot Spectrometer; Compact Radiation Monitor; Electrostatic Plasma Brake

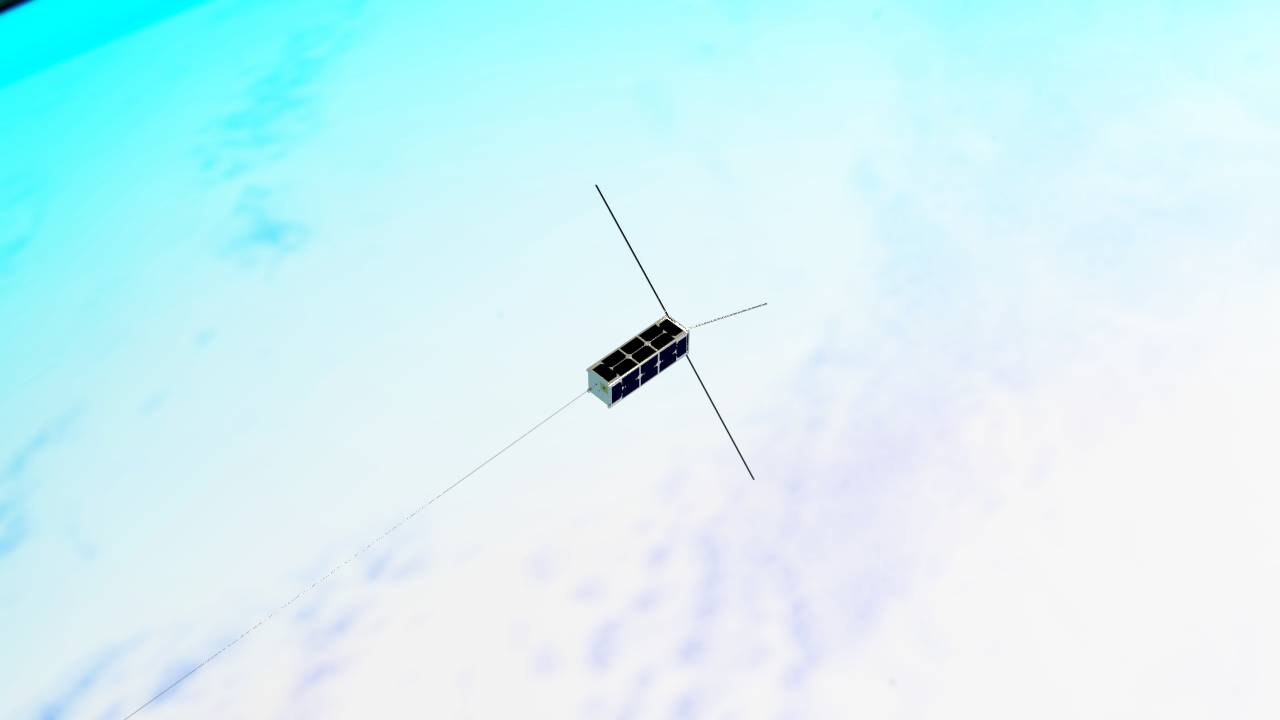
Artist's impression of Aalto-1 releasing its electrostatic plasma brake tether.

Aalto-1 was a Finnish research nanosatellite, created by students of Aalto University. Based on the CubeSat architecture, it was originally scheduled to be launched in 2013, it was launched on 23 June 2017. It was Finland's first student satellite project and indigenously produced satellite (it was the first Finnish satellite that started development but not the first launched as the second satellite in the Aalto-series, Aalto-2, launched before Aalto-1). As of 2021, the satellite was operational.

The satellite's mission ended as it re-entered the atmosphere on 1 September 2024.

== Project history ==
The Aalto-1 project began in 2010 with a feasibility study, which was conducted as part of a university course on space technology. The study was followed by the publication of a preliminary design in 2011. A critical design review (CDR) of the satellite was conducted in 2012. In all, over 80 students of Aalto University's School of Electrical Engineering were involved in the project.

== Design ==
The solar-powered CubeSat – based satellite weighed approximately 4 kg (8.8 lb), and had 3 main payloads: a miniature Fabry-Pérot spectrometer, designed by VTT Technical Research Centre, a RADMON-radiation detector developed by University of Helsinki and University of Turku for the study of solar wind conditions in the Earth orbit (and to study the radiation environment in general), and an electric sail (dubbed a "brake tether"), which was designed for an atmospheric entry at the end of its 2-year operational lifespan, with the intent of avoiding the creation of space junk.

== Launch ==
Originally the satellite was to be launched by a Falcon 9 launch vehicle, but the launcher suffered multiple delays due to the accidents that plagued the Falcon 9 in 2015 and 2016. The launch was removed from the Falcon 9, and Aalto-1 was launched on 23 June 2017 by PSLV-C38 launch vehicle from India.

== Successor satellites ==
The next satellite in the Aalto-series, Aalto-2 (SATCAT: 42729, COSPAR: 1998-067MJ), was launched to ISS on 18 April 2017 (before Aalto-1) and released to orbit on 25 May 2017 (before Aalto-1) and decayed from orbit on 6 February 2019.

Another Finnish satellite with roots in the Aalto-series of satellites was the Reaktor Hello World satellite. The Aalto University team behind Aalto-1 and Aalto-2 also worked on the Reaktor Hello World.

The Aalto-1 and Aalto-2 satellites paved the way for the Suomi 100 (literally "Finland 100"; COSPAR:2018-099AY, SATCAT:43804) satellite, which was developed by Aalto University and other Finnish institutions for the celebrations of the 100th anniversary of Finland in 2017. The satellite was built during 2017 and it was launched 3 December 2018.

An approximate copy of Suomi 100 satellite was built in September-October 2017 in a lorry that toured Finland. This lorry, named Avaruusrekka (literally "Space Lorry") toured cities of Finland, stopping in each city. At every stop, the copy satellite was built one step forward, with the copy satellite getting completed at the end of the tour. The copy satellite was sent to the stratosphere via a stratospheric gas balloon (so the copy satellite was not a real satellite and it never went to space) from Espoo, from outside the WeeGee centre in November 2017.

A third Aalto-satellite, Aalto-3 has been under development by Aalto University but as of November 2024 it has not been launched.
