= Pekka Janhunen =

Finnish physicist

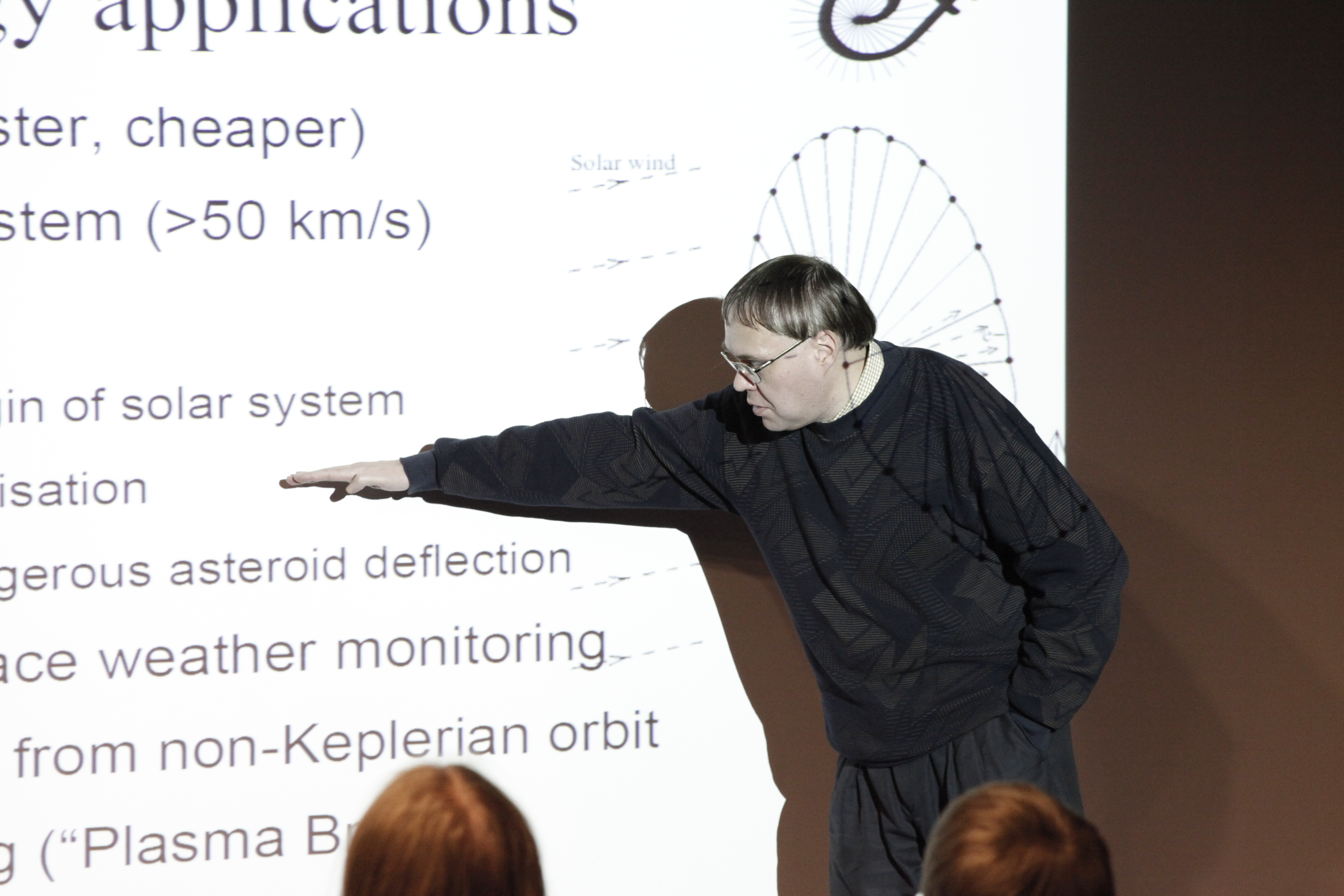
Pekka Janhunen at a 2013 ESTCube-1 presentation

Pekka Janhunen is a Finnish space physicist, astrobiologist, and inventor. He is a research manager at the Finnish Meteorological Institute's Space and Earth Observation Centre and a visiting professor at the University of Tartu, Estonia. He is also senior technical advisor at Aurora Propulsion Technologies, a startup company operating in the space sector. Janhunen studied theoretical physics at the University of Helsinki and earned his Ph.D. in space plasma physics simulations in 1994. He has also published a theory on the origin of multicellular life. Janhunen is best known for his electric solar wind sail invention.

== Research ==
=== Electric sail ===
Janhunen's electric sail could enable travel at speeds of up to 100 km/s in space without any fuel consumption. With no major problems in any of the technical fields thus far, planning of the first test mission was reported to have begun, as per a 2008 ScienceDaily article. Janhunen received funding for his electric solar wind sail research from the Runar Bäckström foundation in 2005.

=== Steam balloons as rocket launch pads ===
Janhunen has proposed that steam balloons could be used to launch rockets and satellites from higher altitudes. According to the Finnish scientist, steam balloons are a cost-effective way of lifting a rocket into the stratosphere. The method is considered to be safe and could reduce the carbon footprint of future rocket launches, whereas in the past, emissions alone had terrible implications for the climate.

=== Natural illumination solution for rotating space settlements ===
Janhunen has proposed a lighting solution for an O'Neill Cylinder. According to this concept, sunlight is concentrated by cylindrical paraboloid concentrators and reflected by semi-toroidal and conical reflectors and controlled by local blinders to simulate Earth-like diurnal and seasonal illumination cycles.

=== Shielded dumbbell L5 settlement ===
Janhunen has also conceived of a two-sphere dumbbell configuration design of a rotating settlement for a first-generation in-space habitat settlement.

=== Ceres space station ===
Built in the orbit of the dwarf planet Ceres, Janhunen's megasatellite structure would consist of numerous cylinders, each many kilometers in size. They would be mounted on a disc that is lit from above and below by sun mirrors. Ceres would supply the materials for the construction. According to Janhunen, Ceres is best suited for such a project, because the surface of the dwarf planet contains nitrogen, which is needed to create an Earth-like atmosphere. Such a settlement could also be realized elsewhere, for example in the orbit of Mars, whose smaller moon Deimos would offer itself as a quarry.
