= Portuguese Space Agency =

- Agência Espacial Portuguesa
- Portuguese Space Agency logo

Agency overview
- Formed: March 12, 2019; 7 years ago
- Preceding agency: Space Office
- Type: Space agency
- Jurisdiction: Portuguese government
- Headquarters: Santa Maria, Azores, Portugal; 36°58′28.55″N 25°9′31.34″W
- President: Ricardo Conde
- Vice President: Eduardo Ferreira
- Employees: <100 (2020)
- Annual budget: ▲€40,0 million (2020)
- Website: ptspace.pt

The Portuguese Space Agency (Note: Portuguese: Agência Espacial Portuguesa) is the Portuguese space agency created by the Portuguese government in collaboration with the regional government of the Azores in 2019. It is headquartered at Santa Maria Island, in the Azores, Portugal. The agency succeeds the Space Office of the Foundation for Science and Technology.

== Objectives ==
Its objectives are to promote and implement the "Portugal Space 2030". Strategy to articulate the management of the various national programs linked to Space. PT Space is responsible for ensuring the regular publication of the Portuguese Space Catalogue.

The agency focuses on Earth observation and the small satellite industry in addition to the creation of a space port on Santa Maria Island. Overall the agency will focus on how space can be used to solve problems on the ground.

The National Space Agency coordinates Portuguese participation in the European Space Agency (ESA) and also advises the Portuguese government on contributions and subscriptions made to ESA. In collaboration with FCT, Portugal Space manages funds from ESA and the European Southern Observatory (ESO) and represents Portugal in these international organizations, as well as in the newly created Board of Directors of the European Solar Telescope (EST). Portugal Space is also Portugal's national representative to the European Commission for space-related matters, namely the European Space Program (Copernicus, Galileo, GOVSATCOM, SSA) and Horizon Europe and sits on the board of directors of the GSA (later EUSPA).

== Programs ==
In 2022 the Portuguese Space Agency launched an initiative called Astronaut for a Day. This program provides young students in the Portuguese education system with the chance to experience a zero-gravity flight mirroring the same sensations astronauts have in space.Inspired by the astronaut selection processes of renowned space agencies, this national competition involved a rigorous selection process which included 5 elimination phases and was designed for students aged 14–18. This initiative is considered a significant success and plays a key role in the Agency's strategy of fostering interest in STEM fields, particularly in space studies and careers among younger generations.
