= Elements of AI =

Online course

- Website type: Online education
- Available in: English, German, Italian, Finnish, Swedish, Estonian, Ukrainian, Latvian, Lithuanian, Norwegian, Croatian, Spanish, Portuguese, Maltese, Dutch, French, Irish, Icelandic, Bulgarian, Czech, Danish, Greek, Polish, Romanian, Slovak, Slovene
- Owners: University of Helsinki, MinnaLearn.
- Website: elementsofai.com
- Commercial: No
- Launched: 2018

Elements of AI is a massive open online course (MOOC) teaching the basics of artificial intelligence. The course, originally launched in 2018, is designed and organized by the University of Helsinki and learning technology company MinnaLearn. The course includes modules on machine learning, neural networks, the philosophy of artificial intelligence, and using artificial intelligence to solve problems. It consists of two parts: Introduction to AI and its sequel, Building AI, that was released in late 2020. In November 2019, the course was named one of four winners of MIT's Inclusive Innovation Challenge.

University of Helsinki's computer science department is known as the alma mater of Linus Torvalds, a Finnish-American software engineer who is the creator of the Linux kernel, which is the kernel for Linux operating systems.

== EU's AI pledge ==
The government of Finland has pledged to offer the course for all EU citizens by the end of 2021, as the course is made available in all the official EU languages. The initiative was launched as part of Finland's Presidency of the Council of the European Union in 2019, with the European Commission providing translations of the course materials.

In 2017, Finland launched an AI strategy to stay competitive in the field of AI amid growing competition between China and the United States. With the support of private companies and the government, Finland's now-realized goal was to get 1 percent of its citizens to participate in Elements of AI.

Other governments have also given their support to the course. For instance, Germany's Federal Minister for Economic Affairs and Energy Peter Altmeier has encouraged citizens to take part in the course to help Germany gain a competitive advantage in AI. Sweden's Minister for Energy and Minister for Digital Development Anders Ygeman has said that Sweden aims to teach 1 percent of its population the basics of AI like Finland has.

== Participants ==
Elements of AI had enrolled more than 1 million students from more than 110 countries by May 2023. A quarter of the course's participants are aged 45 and over, and some 40 percent are women. Among Nordic participants, the share of women is nearly 60 percent.

In September 2022, the course was available in Finnish, Swedish, Estonian, English, German, Latvian, Norwegian, French, Belgian, Czech, Greek, Slovak, Slovene, Latvian, Lithuanian, Portuguese, Spanish, Irish, Icelandic, Maltese, Croatian, Romanian, Italian, Dutch, Polish, and Danish.
